= Coldplay discography =

Discography of British band

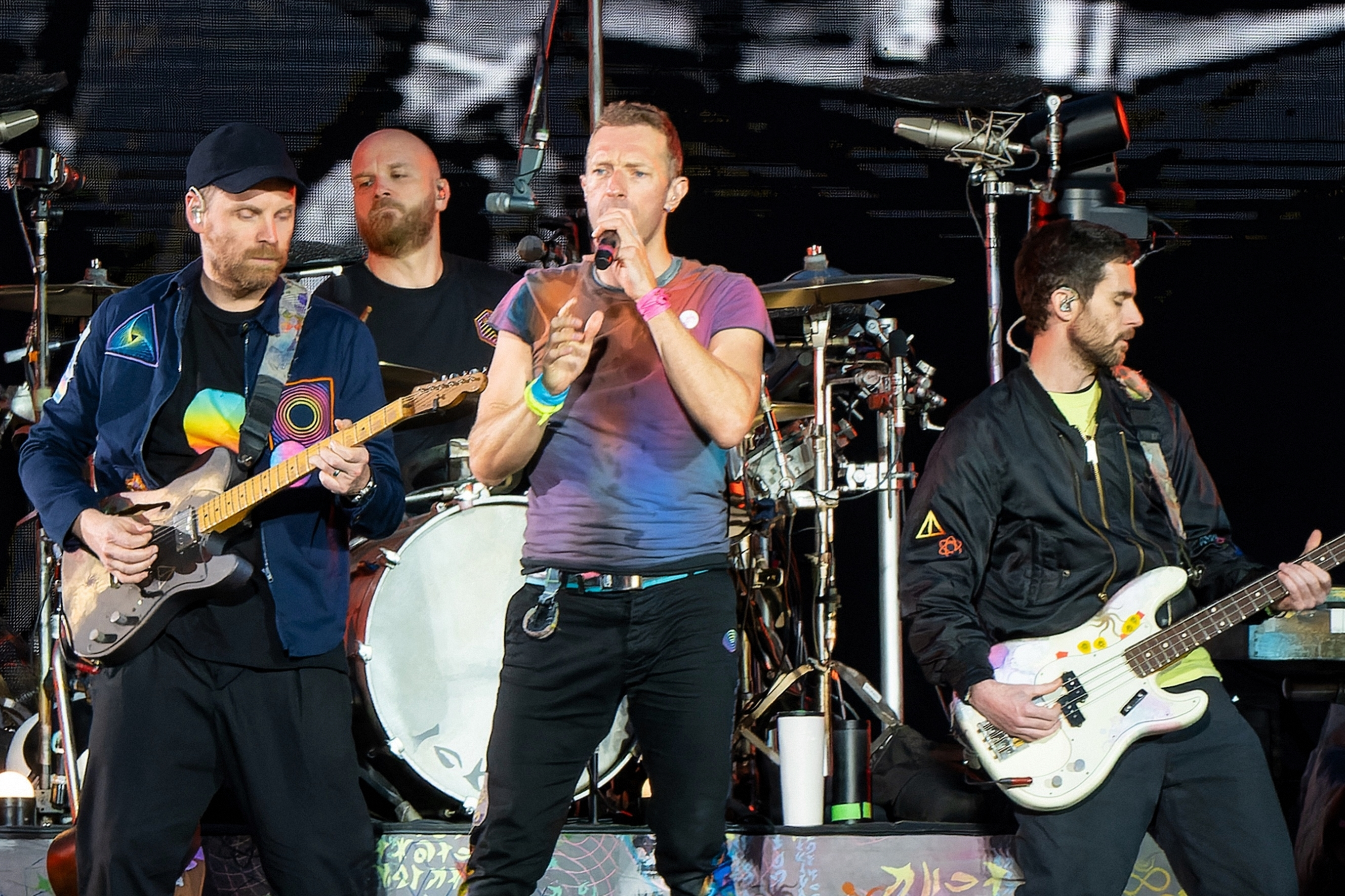
- Coldplay at Etihad Stadium in 2023
- Studio albums: 10
- Extended plays: 18
- Live albums: 6
- Compilation albums: 13
- Singles: 43
- Promotional singles: 14
- Charity singles: 5

British rock band Coldplay have released 10 studio albums, 18 extended plays, 6 live albums, 13 compilation albums, 43 singles, 14 promotional singles and 5 charity singles. They are considered the most successful group of the 21st century and one of the best-selling acts of all time, with estimated sales of 170 million records. According to Luminate, they have shifted 18.2 million albums and 33.6 million songs in the United States, based on physical and digital copies. Moreover, the British Phonographic Industry (BPI) claimed that their international success contributed to British music export rates several times. Other milestones for the band include more than 40 billion streams on Spotify and 20 billion views on YouTube.

After launching their extended plays Safety (1998) and The Blue Room (1999), Coldplay entered the UK Singles Chart for the first time with "Brothers & Sisters", at number 92. It was followed by "Shiver" and "Yellow", which became their first Top 40 and Top 10 entries, respectively. With the release of Parachutes (2000), A Rush of Blood to the Head (2002), and X&Y (2005), they scored three of the 50 best-selling albums in the United Kingdom. The former included Top 10 singles such as "In My Place", "Clocks" and "The Scientist", while the latter achieved one of the largest sales week in the country. Coldplay were also the first British act to spend three weeks atop Billboard 200 since the Beatles in 2000 and 2001.

Globally, the International Federation of the Phonographic Industry (IFPI) has confirmed that X&Y (2005), Viva la Vida or Death and All His Friends (2008), Mylo Xyloto (2011), and Ghost Stories (2014) were the most successful albums made available by a band in their respective years, with the first two becoming the overall best-sellers. Similarly, all four have topped the charts in over 30 countries each. In terms of singles, "Viva la Vida" heralded the first time British musicians peaked at number one in the United States and United Kingdom simultaneously in nearly four decades; "Paradise" became the highest-selling rock song of 2011 in the latter region; and "A Sky Full of Stars" was an iTunes chart-topper in more than 90 markets.

Coldplay then released their seventh album, A Head Full of Dreams (2015), which was mostly kept from number one around the world by Adele's 25. However, the record enjoyed a sales resurgence after the band performed at the Super Bowl 50 halftime show, eventually reaching six million copies. Its accompanying piece, Kaleidoscope EP, featured a live version of "Something Just Like This", ranked by the IFPI as the third-best-selling track of 2017. The group's eighth album, Everyday Life, arrived in 2019 and reached number one in 12 countries. Its successor, Music of the Spheres (2021), had the biggest first-week sales of the year in the United Kingdom when made available. MusicWeek reported that the record boosted CD sales in the country. Coldplay also became the first British band to debut atop Billboard Hot 100, with "My Universe". Their tenth album, Moon Music (2024), was the fastest-selling release of the 2020s by a group on the UK Albums Chart, extending their streak of most number-ones without missing the top (10).

== Albums ==
=== Studio albums ===
List of studio albums
Title	Details	Peak chart positions										Sales	Certifications
Title	Details	UK	AUS	CAN	FRA	GER	ITA	NLD	NZ	SWI	US	Sales	Certifications
Parachutes	Released: 10 July 2000; Label: Parlophone; Formats: CD, LP, cassette (CS)	1	2	19	31	54	11	7	4	38	51	UK: 2,780,836 (Note: British total sales for Parachutes as of October 2021.); NZ: 75,000 (Note: New Zealand total sales for Parachutes as of October 2012.); US: 5,600,000 (Note: American total sales for Parachutes as of June 2025.)	BPI: 9× Platinum; ARIA: 4× Platinum; BVMI: Gold; FIMI: 2× Platinum; IFPI SWI: Gold; MC: 2× Platinum; NVPI: Platinum; RIAA: 2× Platinum; RMNZ: 4× Platinum; SNEP: 2× Gold
A Rush of Blood to the Head	Released: 26 August 2002; Label: Parlophone; Formats: CD, LP, CS	1	1	1	4	1	1	3	1	1	5	UK: 3,031,882 (Note: British total sales for A Rush of Blood to the Head as of August 2022.); NZ: 90,000 (Note: New Zealand total sales for A Rush of Blood to the Head as of October 2012.); US: 4,925,000 (Note: American total sales for A Rush of Blood to the Head as of June 2014.)	BPI: 10× Platinum; ARIA: 7× Platinum; BVMI: 2× Platinum; FIMI: 2× Platinum; IFPI SWI: Gold; MC: 4× Platinum; NVPI: Platinum; RIAA: 4× Platinum; RMNZ: 5× Platinum; SNEP: 2× Gold
X&Y	Released: 6 June 2005; Label: Parlophone; Formats: CD, LP, download (DL)	1	1	1	1	1	1	1	1	1	1	UK: 2,829,776 (Note: British total sales for X&Y as of October 2021.); US: 3,158,000 (Note: American total sales for X&Y as of May 2008.)	BPI: 9× Platinum; ARIA: 6× Platinum; BVMI: 3× Platinum; FIMI: Platinum; IFPI SWI: 2× Platinum; MC: 5× Platinum; NVPI: Platinum; RIAA: 3× Platinum; RMNZ: 6× Platinum; SNEP: 2× Platinum
Viva la Vida or Death and All His Friends	Released: 12 June 2008; Label: Parlophone; Formats: CD, LP, DL	1	1	1	1	1	1	1	1	1	1	UK: 1,500,000 (Note: British certified sales for Viva la Vida or Death and All His Friends as of March 2017.); FRA: 650,000 (Note: French total sales for Viva la Vida or Death and All His Friends as of October 2011.); US: 2,800,000 (Note: American total sales for Viva la Vida or Death and All His Friends as of August 2012.)	BPI: 5× Platinum; ARIA: 4× Platinum; BVMI: 7× Gold; FIMI: 2× Platinum; IFPI SWI: 3× Platinum; MC: 5× Platinum; NVPI: 3× Platinum; RIAA: 2× Platinum; RMNZ: 4× Platinum; SNEP: Diamond
Mylo Xyloto	Released: 24 October 2011; Label: Parlophone; Formats: CD, LP, DL	1	1	1	1	1	1	1	1	1	1	UK: 1,732,781 (Note: British total sales for Mylo Xyloto as of September 2026.); FRA: 415,000 (Note: French total sales for Mylo Xyloto as of January 2015.); US: 1,000,000 (Note: American total sales for Mylo Xyloto as of January 2012.)	BPI: 5× Platinum; ARIA: 2× Platinum; BVMI: 2× Platinum; FIMI: 4× Platinum; IFPI SWI: 2× Platinum; MC: 3× Platinum; NVPI: 2× Platinum; RIAA: Platinum; RMNZ: 3× Platinum; SNEP: 3× Platinum
Ghost Stories	Released: 19 May 2014; Label: Parlophone; Formats: CD, LP, DL	1	1	1	1	1	1	2	1	1	1	UK: 733,000 (Note: British total sales for Ghost Stories as of October 2021.); US: 2,000,000 (Note: American certified sales for Ghost Stories as of April 2023.)	BPI: 2× Platinum; ARIA: 4× Platinum; BVMI: 3× Gold; FIMI: 3× Platinum; IFPI SWI: 2× Platinum; MC: 2× Platinum; NVPI: Platinum; RIAA: 2× Platinum; RMNZ: 2× Platinum; SNEP: 3× Platinum
A Head Full of Dreams	Released: 4 December 2015; Label: Parlophone; Formats: CD, LP, DL, streaming	1	2	2	4	3	2	1	4	1	2	UK: 1,375,805 (Note: British total sales for A Head Full of Dreams as of January 2020.); US: 1,000,000 (Note: American certified sales for A Head Full of Dreams as of December 2016.)	BPI: 4× Platinum; ARIA: 2× Platinum; BVMI: 2× Platinum; FIMI: 5× Platinum; IFPI SWI: Platinum; MC: 2× Platinum; NVPI: Platinum; RIAA: Platinum; RMNZ: 4× Platinum; SNEP: Diamond
Everyday Life	Released: 22 November 2019; Label: Parlophone; Formats: CD, LP, CS, DL, streaming	1	1	3	1	4	3	1	2	1	7	UK: 300,000 (Note: British certified sales for Everyday Life as of March 2025.); US: 199,000 (Note: American total sales for Everyday Life as of December 2020.)	BPI: Platinum; FIMI: Platinum; NVPI: Gold; RMNZ: Gold; SNEP: Platinum
Music of the Spheres	Released: 15 October 2021; Label: Parlophone; Formats: CD, LP, CS, DL, streaming	1	1	2	1	2	4	1	2	2	4	UK: 204,623 (Note: British total sales for Music of the Spheres as of August 2022.); FRA: 150,000 (Note: French total sales for Music of the Spheres as of December 2024.); US: 395,000 (Note: American total sales for Music of the Spheres as of January 2023.)	BPI: Gold; FIMI: Platinum; MC: Gold; RMNZ: Platinum; SNEP: Platinum
Moon Music	Released: 4 October 2024; Label: Parlophone; Formats: CD, LP, DL, streaming	1	1	2	3	1	1	1	2	1	1	UK: 300,000 (Note: British certified sales for Moon Music as of February 2025.)	BPI: Platinum; BVMI: Gold; FIMI: Gold; RMNZ: Gold; SNEP: Platinum

=== Live albums ===
List of live albums
Title	Details	Peak chart positions										Certifications
Title	Details	UK	AUS	CAN	FRA	GER	ITA	NLD	NZ	SWI	US	Certifications
Live 2003	Released: 10 November 2003; Label: Parlophone; Formats: CD, DL	46	16	10	26	34	— (Note: Live 2003 did not enter the Italian Albums Chart, but peaked at number one on the Italian Music DVDs Chart.)	—	26	—	13	ARIA: Gold; RIAA: Gold; RMNZ: Gold
LeftRightLeftRightLeft	Released: 15 May 2009; Label: Parlophone; Formats: CD, DL	Distributed for free across all formats										N/A
Live 2012	Released: 19 November 2012; Label: Parlophone; Formats: CD, DL	— (Note: Live 2012 did not enter the UK Albums Chart, but peaked at number one on the UK Official Music Video Chart.)	—	—	5	3	10	75	—	11	— (Note: Live 2012 did not enter the Billboard 200, but peaked at number two on the Music Video Sales chart.)	FIMI: Gold; RMNZ: Gold; SNEP: Platinum
Ghost Stories Live 2014	Released: 24 November 2014; Label: Parlophone; Formats: CD, DL	— (Note: Ghost Stories Live 2014 did not enter the UK Albums Chart, but peaked at number two on the UK Official Music Video Chart.)	—	—	165	—	14	15	24	—	93	SNEP: Gold
Live in Buenos Aires	Released: 7 December 2018; Label: Parlophone; Formats: CD, LP, CS, DL, streaming	15	7	66	16	5	9	2	30	4	128	BPI: Silver; SNEP: Platinum
Love in Tokyo	Released: 7 December 2018; Label: Parlophone; Formats: CD, DL, streaming	Released exclusively in Japan										N/A
"—" denotes a recording that did not chart or was not released in that territory.

=== Compilation albums ===
List of compilation albums
Title	Details	Peak chart positions							Certifications
Title	Details	UK	AUS	DEN	FRA	ITA	POR	SPA	Certifications
A Rush of Blood to the Head / Parachutes	Released: 2 October 2006; Label: EMI; Formats: CD box set	—	—	—	—	—	22	—	
The Singles 1999–2006	Released: 26 March 2007; Label: Parlophone; Formats: 7" box set	196	—	5	—	—	—	—	
Parachutes / A Rush of Blood to the Head / Live 2003	Released: 21 August 2007; Label: EMI; Formats: CD+DVD box set	—	—	—	134	—	—	—	
Viva la Vida / X&Y	Released: 9 July 2010; Label: EMI; Formats: CD box set	—	—	—	127	—	—	—	
4 CD Catalogue Set	Released: 26 November 2012; Label: EMI; Formats: CD box set	80	27	—	—	60	4	48	BPI: Silver; AFP: Gold; FIMI: Gold
X&Y / Parachutes	Released: 3 October 2013; Label: EMI; Formats: CD box set	—	—	—	—	—	—	—	
A Rush of Blood to the Head / Live 2003	Released: 16 January 2014; Label: Warner Music; Formats: CD+DVD box set	—	—	—	—	—	—	—	
Live 2012 / X&Y	Released: 3 June 2014; Label: Warner Music; Formats: CD+DVD box set	—	—	—	—	—	—	—	
A Head Full of Dreams / Viva la Vida	Released: 2 September 2017; Label: Warner Music; Formats: CD box set	—	—	—	—	—	—	—	
Ghost Stories / X&Y	Released: 16 April 2018; Label: Warner Music; Formats: CD box set	—	—	—	—	—	—	—	
The Butterfly Package	Released: 7 December 2018; Label: Parlophone; Formats: CD+DVD set, LP+DVD set	Combined with Live in Buenos Aires							N/A
Mylo Xyloto / Viva la Vida	Released: 23 January 2019; Label: Warner Music; Formats: CD box set	—	—	—	—	—	—	—	
Everyday Life / A Head Full of Dreams	Released: 13 September 2021; Label: Warner Music; Formats: CD box set	—	—	—	—	—	—	—	
"—" denotes a recording that did not chart or was not released in that territory.

== Extended plays ==
List of extended plays
Title	Details	Notes	Ref.
Safety	Released: 25 May 1998; Label: Self-published; Format: CD, CS	Coldplay's first public release. It was financed by manager Phil Harvey for £1500 and its 500 pressed copies were mostly given away.	
The Blue Room	Released: 11 October 1999; Label: Parlophone; Format: CD, 12", CS	The band's first extended play under Parlophone. It features Chris Allison's version of "Don't Panic", while "High Speed" remained unaltered for Parachutes (2000).	
Acoustic	Released: 29 October 2000; Label: Parlophone; Format: CD, CS	Also known as Sparks. Promotional release given away by The Independent. It features an acoustic version of "Yellow" from Jo Whiley's Lunchtime Social on BBC Radio 1.	
Trouble – Norwegian Live EP	Released: 5 February 2001; Label: Parlophone; Format: CD, CS	Recorded at Rockefeller Music Hall in Oslo, Norway during the marketing campaign for Parachutes (2000), being released exclusively for the region.	
Mince Spies	Released: 30 November 2001; Label: Parlophone; Format: CD	Exclusive Christmas release limited to 1,000 copies. It was distributed to Coldplay fan club members and includes a cover of "Have Yourself a Merry Little Christmas".	
Remixes	Released: 21 July 2003; Label: Parlophone; Format: 12"	Exclusive release limited to 1,000 copies. It features remixes of "Clocks" and "God Put a Smile upon Your Face" produced by Röyksopp and Mr Thing, respectively.	
Prospekt's March	Released: 21 November 2008; Label: Parlophone; Format: CD, 12", DL	Complementary extended play for Viva la Vida or Death and All His Friends (2008). It includes five new songs and three remixed tracks from the album.	
Every Teardrop Is a Waterfall	Released: 26 June 2011; Label: Parlophone; Format: CD, 7", DL	Promotional release featuring "Moving to Mars" and the Mylo Xyloto (2011) track "Major Minus". Chart data for the extended play was combined with its namesake single.	
iTunes Festival: London 2011	Released: 18 September 2011; Label: EMI; Format: DL	Distributed for free by The Sunday Times. It included a selection of songs that Coldplay performed at the iTunes Festival prior to the Mylo Xyloto Tour (2011–2012).	(Note: The first version had seven tracks, with another five being released in the following week. Apple also issued an edition with three songs for Christmas.)
Live in Madrid	Released: 31 October 2011; Label: EMI; Format: DL	Promotional extended play featuring tracks from the group's Unstaged performance, which was directed by Anton Corbijn and originally broadcast on YouTube.	
A Sky Full of Stars	Released: 29 June 2014; Label: Parlophone; Format: CD, DL	Global release of the Target edition tracks from Ghost Stories (2014). Chart data for the extended play was combined with its namesake single.	
Live from Spotify London	Released: 16 December 2016; Label: Parlophone; Format: Streaming	Exclusive Spotify release honouring Coldplay as the most streamed group of all time in the platform. Additionally, it was marketed as a Christmas gift to fans.	
Kaleidoscope EP	Released: 14 July 2017; Label: Parlophone; Format: CD, 12", DL, streaming	Companion piece for A Head Full of Dreams (2015). It includes four new songs and a live version of "Something Just Like This", recorded at Tokyo Dome in Japan.	
Global Citizen – EP 1	Released: 30 November 2018; Label: Parlophone; Format: DL, streaming	Released under the pseudonym Los Unidades, the extended play features guests such as Tiwa Savage and Pharrell Williams. Its proceeds were donated to Global Citizen.	
Reimagined	Released: 21 February 2020; Label: Parlophone; Format: Streaming	Exclusive Apple Music release including acoustic versions for three Everyday Life (2019) songs. It was accompanied by a music short film directed by Andy Hines.	
Live from Climate Pledge Arena	Released: 5 November 2021; Label: Parlophone; Format: Streaming	Exclusive Amazon Music release including a selection of tracks the band performed during their one-off promotional show at Climate Pledge Arena.	
Infinity Station Sessions	Released: 2 December 2021; Label: Parlophone; Format: Streaming	Exclusive Apple Music release including "Christmas Lights" and a selection of tracks from Music of the Spheres (2021) performed live and recorded in Spatial Audio.	
Spotify Singles	Released: 23 February 2022; Label: Parlophone; Format: Streaming	Exclusive Spotify release for the platform's namesake series, including a live performance of "Let Somebody Go" and a cover of Kid Cudi's "Day 'n' Nite".	

== Singles ==
List of singles
Title	Year	Peak chart positions										Certifications	Album
Title	Year	UK	AUS	CAN	FRA	GER	ITA	NLD	NZ	SWI	US	Certifications	Album
"Brothers & Sisters"	1999	92	—	—	— (Note: "Brothers & Sisters" did not enter the France Singles Chart, but peaked at number three on the France Digital Song Sales chart.)	—	—	—	—	—	—		Non-album single
"Shiver"	2000	35	57	—	—	—	—	100	—	—	—	BPI: Silver; RMNZ: Gold	Parachutes
"Yellow"	2000	4	5	— (Note: "Yellow" did not enter the Billboard Canadian Hot 100, but peaked at number 61 on the Canadian Digital Song Sales chart.)	96	99	82	38	23	16	48	BPI: 6× Platinum; ARIA: 9× Platinum; BVMI: Platinum; FIMI: 3× Platinum; RIAA: 4× Platinum; RMNZ: 9× Platinum	Parachutes
"Trouble"	2000	10	—	—	60	—	16	67	16	76	— (Note: "Trouble" did not enter the Billboard Hot 100, but peaked at number 15 on the Bubbling Under Hot 100 chart.)	BPI: Platinum; FIMI: Gold; RMNZ: Platinum	Parachutes
"Don't Panic"	2001	130	57	— (Note: "Don't Panic" did not enter the Billboard Canadian Hot 100, but peaked at number 40 on the Canadian Digital Song Sales chart.)	—	—	47	83	—	—	—	BPI: Silver; RMNZ: Gold	Parachutes
"In My Place"	2002	2	23	2	60	65	4	56	24	37	— (Note: "In My Place" did not enter the Billboard Hot 100, but peaked at number 17 on the Bubbling Under Hot 100 Singles chart.)	BPI: Platinum; FIMI: Gold; RMNZ: Platinum	A Rush of Blood to the Head
"The Scientist"	2002	10	40	16	31	26	23	20	— (Note: "The Scientist" did not enter the NZ Top 40 Singles Chart, but peaked at number four on the NZ Catalogue Singles Chart.)	28	— (Note: "The Scientist" did not enter the Billboard Hot 100, but peaked at number 56 on the Digital Song Sales chart.)	BPI: 5× Platinum; ARIA: 6× Platinum; BVMI: Platinum; FIMI: 3× Platinum; RIAA: 4× Platinum; RMNZ: 6× Platinum	A Rush of Blood to the Head
"Clocks"	2003	9	28	7	65	50	24	2	13	71	29	BPI: 3× Platinum; ARIA: 4× Platinum; FIMI: Platinum; RIAA: 2× Platinum; RMNZ: 4× Platinum	A Rush of Blood to the Head
"God Put a Smile upon Your Face"	2003	100	43	—	—	—	46	65	35	—	—	BPI: Silver	A Rush of Blood to the Head
"Speed of Sound"	2005	2	9	2	42	19	2	6	13	10	8	BPI: Platinum; ARIA: Platinum; FIMI: Gold; MC: Gold; RIAA: Gold; RMNZ: Platinum	X&Y
"Fix You"	2005	4	25	4	189	65	13	54	17	53	59	BPI: 5× Platinum; ARIA: 6× Platinum; BVMI: Platinum; FIMI: 3× Platinum; RIAA: 3× Platinum; RMNZ: 6× Platinum	X&Y
"Talk"	2005	10	20	4	34	29	24	1	20	28	86	BPI: Silver; RMNZ: Gold	X&Y
"The Hardest Part"	2006	— (Note: "The Hardest Part" did not enter the UK Singles Chart, but peaked at number 56 on the UK Singles Downloads Chart.)	40	—	—	—	19	39	28	44	—		X&Y
"Violet Hill"	2008	8	9	6	36	10	9	13	5	11	40	BPI: Gold; ARIA: Gold; RMNZ: Gold	Viva la Vida or Death and All His Friends
"Viva la Vida"	2008	1	2	4	7	5	2	4	16	5	1	BPI: 7× Platinum; ARIA: 9× Platinum; BVMI: 3× Platinum; FIMI: 5× Platinum; IFPI SWI: Platinum; MC: Gold; RIAA: 5× Platinum; RMNZ: 8× Platinum	Viva la Vida or Death and All His Friends
"Lost!" (solo or featuring Jay-Z)	2008	54	—	55	—	73	—	39	—	53	40	BPI: Silver	Viva la Vida or Death and All His Friends
"Life in Technicolor II"	2009	28	63	92	—	—	48	30	—	39	—		Prospekt's March
"Strawberry Swing"	2009	158	—	—	—	—	—	—	—	— (Note: "Strawberry Swing" did not enter the Swiss Singles chart, but peaked at number 90 on the Swiss Airplay chart.)	—		Viva la Vida or Death and All His Friends
"Christmas Lights"	2010	13	32	18	182	24	2	2	34	10	25	BPI: 2× Platinum; ARIA: Platinum; BVMI: Platinum; FIMI: Platinum; RMNZ: Platinum	Non-album single
"Every Teardrop Is a Waterfall"	2011	6	14	9	20	24	3	1	13	6	14	BPI: Platinum; ARIA: Platinum; FIMI: Platinum; IFPI SWI: Gold; RMNZ: Platinum	Mylo Xyloto
"Paradise"	2011	1	3	13	5	12	2	2	3	4	15	BPI: 4× Platinum; ARIA: 6× Platinum; BVMI: Platinum; FIMI: 3× Platinum; MC: 3× Platinum; RIAA: 3× Platinum; RMNZ: 6× Platinum; SNEP: Gold	Mylo Xyloto
"Charlie Brown"	2012	22	78	—	148	—	31	—	—	— (Note: "Charlie Brown" did not enter the Swiss Singles chart, but peaked at number 9 on the Swiss Airplay chart.)	— (Note: "Charlie Brown" did not enter the Billboard Hot 100, but peaked at number 10 on the Bubbling Under Hot 100 Singles chart.)	BPI: Platinum; FIMI: Gold; RMNZ: Gold	Mylo Xyloto
"Princess of China" (with Rihanna)	2012	4	16	17	24	41	14	48	8	20	20	BPI: 2× Platinum; ARIA: Platinum; FIMI: Platinum; RMNZ: Gold	Mylo Xyloto
"Hurts Like Heaven"	2012	157	—	—	—	—	—	—	—	— (Note: "Hurts Like Heaven" did not enter the Swiss Singles chart, but peaked at number 57 on the Swiss Airplay chart.)	—		Mylo Xyloto
"Atlas"	2013	12	30	33	31	19	9	3	20	10	69		The Hunger Games: Catching Fire
"Magic"	2014	10	5	13	6	14	2	2	10	5	14	BPI: Platinum; ARIA: 4× Platinum; FIMI: 3× Platinum; IFPI SWI: Gold; MC: Platinum; RIAA: Platinum; RMNZ: Platinum	Ghost Stories
"A Sky Full of Stars"	2014	9	2	4	3	6	1	2	2	2	10	BPI: 5× Platinum; ARIA: 8× Platinum; BVMI: 2× Platinum; FIMI: 5× Platinum; IFPI SWI: Platinum; MC: 3× Platinum; RIAA: 4× Platinum; RMNZ: 6× Platinum; SNEP: Gold	Ghost Stories
"True Love"	2014	180	—	—	146	—	—	—	—	— (Note: "True Love" did not enter the Swiss Singles chart, but peaked at number 77 on the Swiss Airplay chart.)	—		Ghost Stories
"Ink"	2014	156	—	—	—	—	49	68	—	— (Note: "Ink" did not enter the Swiss Singles chart, but peaked at number 81 on the Swiss Airplay chart.)	—	FIMI: Platinum	Ghost Stories
"Adventure of a Lifetime"	2015	7	20	11	2	5	3	11	12	3	13	BPI: 4× Platinum; ARIA: 3× Platinum; BVMI: Platinum; FIMI: 4× Platinum; IFPI SWI: Gold; MC: 2× Platinum; RIAA: 3× Platinum; RMNZ: 4× Platinum; SNEP: Gold	A Head Full of Dreams
"Hymn for the Weekend"	2016	6	24	32	3	11	2	16	— (Note: "Hymn for the Weekend" did not enter the NZ Top 40 Singles Chart, but peaked at number three on the NZ Heatseekers Singles Chart.)	7	25	BPI: 4× Platinum; ARIA: 8× Platinum; BVMI: 2× Platinum; FIMI: 8× Platinum; IFPI SWI: 2× Platinum; MC: 3× Platinum; RIAA: 5× Platinum; RMNZ: 4× Platinum	A Head Full of Dreams
"Up&Up"	2016	71	74	—	161	79	32	65	—	32	—	BPI: Gold; ARIA: Platinum; FIMI: 2× Platinum; RMNZ: Gold	A Head Full of Dreams
"A Head Full of Dreams"	2016	173	—	—	156	—	58	60	—	— (Note: "A Head Full of Dreams" did not enter the Swiss Singles chart, but peaked at number 78 on the Swiss Airplay chart.)	—	BPI: Gold; FIMI: Platinum; RMNZ: Gold	A Head Full of Dreams
"Everglow"	2016	52	93	66	28	42	35	25	— (Note: "Everglow" did not enter the NZ Top 40 Singles Chart, but peaked at number 10 on the NZ Heatseekers Singles Chart.)	16	— (Note: "Everglow" did not enter the Billboard Hot 100, but peaked at number six on the Bubbling Under Hot 100 Singles chart.)	BPI: Platinum; ARIA: Platinum; FIMI: Platinum; MC: Gold; RMNZ: Platinum	A Head Full of Dreams
"Something Just Like This" (with the Chainsmokers)	2017	2	2	3	17	4	3	6	5	3	3	BPI: 6× Platinum; ARIA: 17× Platinum; BVMI: 3× Platinum; FIMI: 7× Platinum; IFPI SWI: 4× Platinum; MC: Diamond; RIAA: 13× Platinum; RMNZ: 9× Platinum; SNEP: Diamond	Memories...Do Not Open and Kaleidoscope EP
"Orphans" / "Arabesque"	2019	27	68	59	172	94	55	37	— (Note: "Orphans" did not enter the NZ Top 40 Singles Chart, but peaked at number 10 on the NZ Hot Singles Chart.)	25	— (Note: "Orphans" did not enter the Billboard Hot 100, but peaked at number six on the Bubbling Under Hot 100 chart.)	BPI: Gold; ARIA: Platinum; FIMI: Gold; RMNZ: Gold; SNEP: Gold	Everyday Life
"Orphans" / "Arabesque"	2019	— (Note: "Arabesque" did not enter the UK Singles Chart, but peaked at number 76 on the UK Singles Sales Chart.)	—	—	—	—	—	— (Note: "Arabesque" did not enter the Netherlands' Single Top 100, but peaked at number 14 on the Netherlands' Single Tip Chart.)	—	—	—		Everyday Life
"Higher Power"	2021	12	44	31	98	35	52	44	— (Note: "Higher Power" did not enter the NZ Top 40 Singles Chart, but peaked at number seven on the NZ Hot Singles Chart.)	18	53	BPI: Platinum; ARIA: Platinum; BVMI: Gold; FIMI: Platinum; MC: Gold; RMNZ: Gold; SNEP: Platinum	Music of the Spheres
"My Universe" (with BTS)	2021	3	7	9	33	13	29	20	17	11	1	BPI: Platinum; ARIA: Platinum; BVMI: Gold; FIMI: 2× Platinum; IFPI SWI: 2× Platinum; MC: 2× Platinum; RIAA: Platinum; RMNZ: 2× Platinum; SNEP: Diamond	Music of the Spheres
"Let Somebody Go" (with Selena Gomez)	2022	24	66	45	115	74	—	53	— (Note: "Let Somebody Go" did not enter the NZ Top 40 Singles Chart, but peaked at number four on the NZ Hot Singles Chart.)	27	91	BPI: Silver; FIMI: Gold; RMNZ: Gold; SNEP: Gold	Music of the Spheres
"Feelslikeimfallinginlove"	2024	16	54	82	66	31	80	33	17	19	81	BPI: Platinum; ARIA: Platinum; IFPI SWI: Gold; MC: Gold; RMNZ: Platinum; SNEP: Platinum	Moon Music
"We Pray" (featuring Little Simz, Burna Boy, Elyanna and Tini)	2024	20	— (Note: "We Pray" did not enter the Australian ARIA Singles Chart but peaked at number 37 on the ARIA Digital Track Chart.)	92	45	40	71	30	21	22	87	BPI: Gold; ARIA: Gold; RMNZ: Gold; SNEP: Platinum	Moon Music
"All My Love"	2024	43	— (Note: "All My Love" did not enter the Australian ARIA Singles Chart but peaked at number 23 on the ARIA Digital Track Chart.)	—	—	—	—	90	— (Note: "All My Love" did not enter the NZ Top 40 Singles Chart, but peaked at number two on the NZ Hot Singles Chart.)	49	—	BPI: Silver	Moon Music
"—" denotes a recording that did not chart or was not released in that territory.

=== Promotional singles ===
List of promotional singles
Title	Year	Peak chart positions										Certifications	Album
Title	Year	UK	AUS	CAN	FRA	GER	ITA	NLD	NZ	SWI	US	Certifications	Album
"Moses"	2003	—	—	—	—	—	—	—	—	—	—		Live 2003
"What If"	2006	—	—	—	—	—	—	—	—	—	—		X&Y
"Lovers in Japan"	2008	131	—	77	—	—	41	—	—	— (Note: "Lovers in Japan" did not enter the Swiss Singles chart, but peaked at number 56 on the Swiss Airplay chart.)	— (Note: "Lovers in Japan" did not enter the Billboard Hot 100, but peaked at number 10 on the Bubbling Under Hot 100 Singles chart.)		Viva la Vida or Death and All His Friends
"Up with the Birds" / "U.F.O."	2012	— (Note: "Up with the Birds" did not enter the UK Singles Chart, but peaked at number 27 on the UK Physical Singles Chart.)	—	—	—	—	—	—	—	—	—		Mylo Xyloto
"Up with the Birds" / "U.F.O."	2012	—	—	—	—	—	—	—	—	—	—		Mylo Xyloto
"Up in Flames"	2012	—	—	—	—	—	—	—	—	—	—		Mylo Xyloto
"Midnight"	2014	48	25	27	5	44	2	8	11	19	29	BPI: Silver; FIMI: Gold; RMNZ: Gold	Ghost Stories
"Miracles (Someone Special)" (with Big Sean)	2017	54	—	—	72	—	76	— (Note: "Miracles (Someone Special)" did not enter the Netherlands' Single Top 100, but peaked at number two on the Netherlands' Single Tip Chart.)	— (Note: "Miracles (Someone Special)" did not enter the NZ Top 40 Singles Chart, but peaked at number five on the NZ Heatseekers Singles Chart.)	45	—	FIMI: Gold	Kaleidoscope EP
"Everyday Life"	2019	— (Note: "Everyday Life" did not enter the UK Singles Chart, but peaked at number 58 on the UK Singles Sales Chart.)	— (Note: "Everyday Life" did not enter the ARIA Singles Chart, but peaked at number 38 on the ARIA Digital Track Chart.)	— (Note: "Everyday Life" did not enter the Billboard Canadian Hot 100, but peaked at number 37 on the Canadian Digital Song Sales chart.)	—	—	—	— (Note: "Everyday Life" did not enter the Netherlands' Single Top 100, but peaked at number seven on the Netherlands' Single Tip Chart.)	—	43	—		Everyday Life
"Champion of the World"	2020	93	—	—	—	—	—	— (Note: "Champion of the World" did not enter the Netherlands' Single Top 100, but peaked at number 41 on the Netherlands' Airplay Chart.)	— (Note: "Champion of the World" did not enter the NZ Top 40 Singles Chart, but peaked at number 25 on the NZ Hot Singles Chart.)	56	—		Everyday Life
"Flags"	2020	— (Note: "Flags" did not enter the UK Singles Chart, but peaked at number 56 on the UK Singles Sales Chart.)	—	—	—	—	—	— (Note: "Flags" did not enter the Netherlands' Single Top 100, but peaked at number 31 on the Netherlands' Airplay Chart.)	— (Note: "Flags" did not enter the NZ Top 40 Singles Chart, but peaked at number 18 on the NZ Hot Singles Chart.)	— (Note: "Flags" did not enter the Swiss Singles chart, but peaked at number 35 on the Swiss Airplay chart.)	—		Everyday Life
"Coloratura"	2021	— (Note: "Coloratura" did not enter the UK Singles Chart, but peaked at number 68 on the UK Singles Sales Chart.)	—	—	—	—	—	—	—	—	—		Music of the Spheres
"People of the Pride"	2022	—	—	—	—	—	—	—	—	—	—		Music of the Spheres
"Biutyful"	2022	—	—	—	—	—	—	—	—	—	—		Music of the Spheres
"Humankind"	2022	— (Note: "Humankind" did not enter the UK Singles Chart, but peaked at number 94 on the UK Singles Sales Chart.)	—	—	—	—	—	— (Note: "Humankind" did not enter the Netherlands' Single Top 100, but peaked at number 25 on the Netherlands' Airplay Chart.)	— (Note: "Humankind" did not enter the NZ Top 40 Singles Chart, but peaked at number three on the NZ Hot Singles Chart.)	—	—		Music of the Spheres
"—" denotes a recording that did not chart or was not released in that territory.

=== Charity singles ===
List of charity singles
Title	Year	Notes	Ref.
"2000 Miles"	2003	Acoustic cover of the Pretenders' song, released as a digital download on Coldplay's official website. All the proceeds were donated to Stop Handgun Violence and Future Forests.	
"Lhuna" (featuring Kylie Minogue)	2008	Recorded during the sessions for Viva la Vida or Death and All His Friends (2008) and originally meant to feature David Bowie along with Minogue. Released to promote World AIDS Day.	
"Aliens"	2017	All royalties were donated to Migrant Offshore Aid Station, which provides medical relief to refugees and migrants in the Mediterranean Sea. The track was later remixed by Markus Dravs as well.	
"Humankind (Live in Mexico City)"	2022	Made available as a limited digital download on Bandcamp for Earth Day 2022. All proceeds were donated to EarthPercent, a project supporting numerous organizations tackling the climate crisis.	
"Let Somebody Go (Live at River Plate)" (with H.E.R.)	2023	Made available as a limited digital download on Bandcamp for Earth Day 2023. All proceeds were donated to EarthPercent, a project supporting numerous organizations tackling the climate crisis.	

== Other charted and certified songs ==
List of other charted and certified songs
Title	Year	Peak chart positions										Certifications	Album
Title	Year	UK	AUS	BEL	CAN	FRA	ITA	NLD	NZ	SWI	US	Certifications	Album
"Sparks"	2000	18	71	—	55	—	—	81	— (Note: "Sparks" did not enter the NZ Top 40 Singles Chart, but peaked at number 13 on the NZ Catalogue Singles Chart.)	—	74	BPI: 2× Platinum; ARIA: 2× Platinum; FIMI: Gold; RMNZ: 4× Platinum	Parachutes
"Have Yourself a Merry Little Christmas"	2001	—	—	—	—	—	—	— (Note: "Have Yourself a Merry Little Christmas" did not enter the Netherlands' Single Top 100, but peaked at number three on the Netherlands' Single Tip Chart.)	—	—	—		Mince Spies
"Green Eyes"	2002	—	—	—	—	—	—	—	—	—	—	BPI: Silver; RMNZ: Gold	A Rush of Blood to the Head
"Life in Technicolor"	2008	112	—	50	92	—	—	—	—	—	—		Viva la Vida or Death and All His Friends
"Cemeteries of London"	2008	134	—	—	—	—	—	—	—	—	—		Viva la Vida or Death and All His Friends
"Death and All His Friends"	2008	183	—	—	—	—	—	—	—	—	—		Viva la Vida or Death and All His Friends
"42"	2008	123	—	—	—	—	—	—	—	—	—		Viva la Vida or Death and All His Friends
"Glass of Water"	2008	134	—	—	92	—	—	—	—	—	— (Note: "Glass of Water" did not enter the Billboard Hot 100, but peaked at number 23 on the Bubbling Under Hot 100 Singles chart.)		Prospekt's March
"Prospekt's March/Poppyfields"	2008	182	—	—	—	—	—	—	—	—	—		Prospekt's March
"The Goldrush"	2009	139	—	—	—	—	—	—	—	—	—		"Life in Technicolor II"
"A Message 2010"	2010	88	—	49	57	—	28	—	—	—	— (Note: "A Message 2010" did not enter the Billboard Hot 100, but peaked at number seven on the Bubbling Under Hot 100 Singles chart.)		Hope for Haiti Now
"Moving to Mars"	2011	163	71	49	64	70	32	—	—	—	90		Every Teardrop Is a Waterfall
"Major Minus"	2011	133	72	50	68	71	34	—	—	—	92		Mylo Xyloto
"Always in My Head"	2014	124	—	—	—	111	60	—	—	—	—		Ghost Stories
"Another's Arms"	2014	70	—	—	—	83	30	— (Note: "Another's Arms" did not enter the Netherlands' Single Top 100, but peaked at number three on the Netherlands' Single Tip Chart.)	—	52	—		Ghost Stories
"O"	2014	108	—	—	—	107	82	—	—	—	—		Ghost Stories
"Miracles"	2014	95	—	—	—	153	—	—	—	—	— (Note: "Miracles" did not enter the Billboard Hot 100, but peaked at number seven on the Bubbling Under Hot 100 Singles chart.)		Unbroken
"Birds"	2015	156	—	—	—	—	—	83	—	—	—	BPI: Silver; FIMI: Gold	A Head Full of Dreams
"Fun" (featuring Tove Lo)	2015	164	—	—	—	118	—	86	—	—	—	FIMI: Gold	A Head Full of Dreams
"Kaleidoscope"	2015	—	—	—	—	—	—	— (Note: "Kaleidoscope" did not enter the Netherlands' Single Top 100, but peaked at number three on the Netherlands' Single Tip Chart.)	—	—	—		A Head Full of Dreams
"Army of One"	2015	198	—	—	—	165	—	— (Note: "Army of One" did not enter the Netherlands' Single Top 100, but peaked at number two on the Netherlands' Single Tip Chart.)	—	—	—		A Head Full of Dreams
"Amazing Day"	2015	—	—	—	—	—	—	— (Note: "Amazing Day" did not enter the Netherlands' Single Top 100, but peaked at number six on the Netherlands' Single Tip Chart.)	—	—	—		A Head Full of Dreams
"Colour Spectrum"	2015	—	—	—	—	—	—	— (Note: "Colour Spectrum" did not enter the Netherlands' Single Top 100, but peaked at number 13 on the Netherlands' Single Tip Chart.)	—	—	—		A Head Full of Dreams
"Hypnotised"	2017	70	—	—	81	185	52	— (Note: "Hypnotised" did not enter the Netherlands' Single Top 100, but peaked at number 15 on the Netherlands' Single Tip Chart.)	— (Note: "Hypnotised" did not enter the NZ Top 40 Singles Chart, but peaked at number one on the NZ Heatseeker Singles Chart.)	45	— (Note: "Hypnotised" did not enter the Billboard Hot 100, but peaked at number 12 on the Bubbling Under Hot 100 Singles chart.)		Kaleidoscope EP
"All I Can Think About Is You"	2017	— (Note: "All I Can Think About Is You" did not enter the UK Singles Chart, but peaked at number 71 on the UK Singles Sales Chart.)	—	—	—	116	—	— (Note: "All I Can Think About Is You" did not enter the Netherlands' Single Top 100, but peaked at number 18 on the Netherlands' Single Tip Chart.)	—	—	—		Kaleidoscope EP
"E-Lo" (as Los Unidades) (featuring Jozzy and Pharrell Williams)	2018	—	—	—	—	—	—	— (Note: "E-Lo" did not enter the Netherlands' Single Top 100, but peaked at number nine on the Netherlands' Single Tip Chart.)	— (Note: "E-Lo" did not enter the NZ Top 40 Singles Chart, but peaked at number 38 on the NZ Hot Singles Chart.)	— (Note: "E-Lo" did not enter the Swiss Singles chart, but peaked at number 100 on the Swiss Airplay chart.)	—		Global Citizen – EP 1
"Trouble in Town"	2019	—	—	(Note: "Trouble in Town" did not enter the Flanders Ultratop 50 chart, but was included as an "Extra Tip" on the Ultratip Bubbling Under 100 chart.)	—	—	—	—	—	—	—		Everyday Life
"Daddy"	2019	—	—	—	—	—	—	—	— (Note: "Daddy" did not enter the NZ Top 40 Singles Chart, but peaked at number 38 on the NZ Hot Singles Chart.)	—	—		Everyday Life
"Church"	2019	94	—	—	—	—	—	—	—	—	—		Everyday Life
"Human Heart" (with We Are King and Jacob Collier)	2021	—	—	—	—	—	—	—	— (Note: "Human Heart" did not enter the NZ Top 40 Singles Chart, but peaked at number 35 on the NZ Hot Singles Chart.)	—	—		Music of the Spheres
"Moon Music" (with Jon Hopkins)	2024	— (Note: "Moon Music" did not enter the UK Singles Chart, but peaked at number 68 on the UK Singles Sales Chart.)	—	—	—	—	—	—	— (Note: "Moon Music" did not enter the NZ Top 40 Singles Chart, but peaked at number three on the NZ Hot Singles Chart.)	— (Note: "Moon Music" did not enter the Swiss Singles chart, but peaked at number 80 on the Swiss Streaming chart.)	—		Moon Music
"Jupiter"	2024	—	—	—	—	—	—	—	— (Note: "Jupiter" did not enter the NZ Top 40 Singles Chart, but peaked at number eight on the NZ Hot Singles Chart.)	—	—		Moon Music
"Good Feelings" (with Ayra Starr)	2024	— (Note: "Good Feelings" did not enter the UK Singles Chart, but peaked at number 86 on the UK Singles Sales Chart.)	—	—	—	—	—	—	— (Note: "Good Feelings" did not enter the NZ Top 40 Singles Chart, but peaked at number six on the NZ Hot Singles Chart.)	—	—		Moon Music
"—" denotes a recording that did not chart or was not released in that territory.

== See also ==
- List of songs by Coldplay
- Coldplay videography
- List of cover versions of Coldplay songs
