= The Singles 1999–2006 =

- Outer sleeve artwork

Box set by Coldplay
- Released: 26 March 2007
- Recorded: 1999–2005
- Studio: Various
- Genre: Alternative rock; pop rock
- Length: 145:39
- Label: Parlophone; Capitol
- Producer: Chris Allison; Nikki Rosetti; Ken Nelson; Danton Supple; Coldplay

Coldplay chronology
X&Y (2005)	The Singles 1999–2006 (2007)	Viva la Vida or Death and All His Friends (2008)

The Singles 1999–2006 is the second box set compilation by British rock band Coldplay. Released on 26 March 2007 by Parlophone in the United Kingdom and Capitol in the United States, it features The Blue Room (1999) and all of their singles up to X&Y (2005) on 7" vinyl. Each one of them was accompanied by its respective B-sides and a sleeve that used the original artwork. Despite only being a promotional single in select countries, "What If" was included in the presses.

== Background ==
Following the launching of Coldplay's third album, X&Y (2005), Billboard reported the band were working with producer Brian Eno for its successor and aiming for a late 2007 release. On 31 January 2007, they announced The Singles 1999–2006 would be released later that year in the United Kingdom. A spokesperson for Capitol mentioned that it would also be available in the United States, but did not confirmed the date. The band stated no CDs were going to be issued for the compilation as well.

== Reception ==
While writing for NME, Mark Beaumont rated the box set with 6/10 stars, praising the musical progression Coldplay have made over the years, but criticizing the B-sides selection consisted of "dreary acoustic rock slurry" songs. He also stated it was "like releasing every deleted scene from Last of the Summer Wine in a special edition bathtub on wheels". Jake Kennedy, from Record Collector, gave 4/5 stars and commented "there are a few treats here for the hardcore fans" and "simply massive tracks that have soundtracked weddings, funerals and stag nights" around the country in the last seven years. adding the box set made a "pattern" between tracks evident, "but if you're doing something right, why stop?". The compilation debuted at number five in the Danish Albums chart. However, it failed to gain traction in other markets, with its first appearance in the UK Albums Chart (at number 196) only being registered in 2016.

== Track listing ==
All tracks written by Coldplay except number 14 (written by Leslie Bricusse and John Barry) and number 28 (co-written with Karl Bartos, Ralf Hütter and Emil Schult).

The Singles 1999–2006 track listing
No.	Title	Original release	Length
1.	"Bigger Stronger"	The Blue Room (October 1999)	4:49
2.	"Don't Panic"	The Blue Room	2:38
3.	"See You Soon"	The Blue Room	2:51
4.	"High Speed"	The Blue Room	4:16
5.	"Such a Rush"	The Blue Room	4:57
6.	"Shiver"	"Shiver" single (March 2000)	5:04
7.	"For You"	"Shiver" single	5:43
8.	"Careful Where You Stand"	"Shiver" single	4:45
9.	"Yellow"	"Yellow" single (June 2000)	4:26
10.	"Help Is Round the Corner"	"Yellow" single	2:36
11.	"Trouble"	"Trouble" single (October 2000)	4:33
12.	"Brothers & Sisters"	"Trouble" single	4:49
13.	"Don't Panic"	"Don't Panic" single (March 2001)	2:20
14.	"You Only Live Twice" (live from Norway)	"Don't Panic" single	4:06
15.	"In My Place"	"In My Place" single (August 2002)	3:48
16.	"One I Love"	"In My Place" single	4:35
17.	"The Scientist"	"The Scientist" single (November 2002)	5:11
18.	"1.36"	"The Scientist" single	2:05
19.	"I Ran Away"	"The Scientist" single	4:26
20.	"Clocks"	"Clocks" single (March 2003)	5:09
21.	"Crests of Waves"	"Clocks" single	3:39
22.	"God Put a Smile upon Your Face"	"God Put a Smile upon Your Face" single (July 2003)	4:56
23.	"Murder"	"God Put a Smile upon Your Face" single	5:34
24.	"Speed of Sound"	"Speed of Sound" single (May 2005)	4:51
25.	"Things I Don't Understand"	"Speed of Sound" single	4:55
26.	"Fix You" (video edit)	"Fix You" single (September 2005)	4:37
27.	"The World Turned Upside Down"	"Fix You" single	4:32
28.	"Talk" (radio edit)	"Talk" single (December 2005)	4:31
29.	"Gravity"	"Talk" single	6:20
30.	"What If"	"What If" single (June 2006)	4:57
31.	"How You See the World" (live from Earls Court)	"What If" single	4:14
32.	"The Hardest Part"	"The Hardest Part" single (April 2006)	4:25
33.	"Pour Me" (live at the Hollywood Bowl)	"The Hardest Part" single	5:01
Total length:			145:39
