= Don't Panic (Coldplay song) =

2001 single by Coldplay

Single by Coldplay

from the album Parachutes
- B-side: "You Only Live Twice" (Live from Norway); "Bigger Stronger" (Live from Norway)
- Released: 19 March 2001
- Recorded: November 1999 – May 2000
- Genre: Indie rock; soft rock
- Length: 2:17
- Label: Parlophone; Nettwerk
- Songwriters: Chris Martin; Jonny Buckland; Guy Berryman; Will Champion
- Producers: Ken Nelson (Parachutes version); Chris Allison (The Blue Room version); Coldplay

Coldplay singles chronology
"Trouble" (2000)	"Don't Panic" (2001)	"In My Place" (2002)

Music video
- "Don't Panic" on YouTube

"Don't Panic" is a song by the British rock band Coldplay. Originally titled "Panic", the earliest known version of the song existed in 1998, performed live during the band's first gig in the same year. It had a different melody, and was included in the band's second EP, The Blue Room. The track was reproduced by Coldplay and British producer Ken Nelson for the band's debut album, Parachutes.

Following their successful releases in 2000, Coldplay and their record label Parlophone thought there was enough exposure of the album in the United Kingdom. Thus, the decision of releasing a fourth single would be for regions that had not been overdosed by the hit singles "Yellow" and "Trouble". They settled on "Don't Panic", which at the time was an audience favourite. It was released in some European regions, and the United Kingdom only received a promo edition. The critical reception of the song was generally positive.

== Background and production ==
"Don't Panic" came into existence while Coldplay was still in its infancy, written and composed by singer Chris Martin. The band had written 10 songs when an early version of "Don't Panic" existed, and the band used it in recruiting its drummer. It was originally called "Panic", and was one of six songs played at Coldplay's first gig in 1998 at Camden's Laurel Tree. This version has a different melody, and the lyrics are an account of a "slightly disastrous evening Chris had spent entertaining a young lady called Alice Hill". Eventually, the title became "Don't Panic".

Don't Panic
Sample of "Don't Panic" from Coldplay's 1999 EP The Blue Room.

The original version of "Don't Panic" was recorded in 1999, different from the version featured in Parachutes. First, lead singer Chris Martin plays the piano during the bridge. As well, there is a feedback-distorted introduction. This version was included in The Blue Room EP, released in October 1999.

For Coldplay's debut album Parachutes (2000), British record producer Ken Nelson re-produced "Don't Panic". The track was recorded live, like many other tracks featured in the album. Guitarist Jonny Buckland recorded twice his overdubbed guitars, and he used parts of the two during the mixing. The band subtly used the acoustic guitar, drums and bass, and also a pump organ. Buckland also provides vocals for the second verse of the song. The song was recorded in Rockfield Studios, Wales, and Parr Street Studio, Liverpool.

"Don't Panic" is the opening track to Parachutes. A guitar-based song, it begins with strummed acoustic guitar riffs, then followed by the vocals of Chris Martin. A review claims that Coldplay's indie rock inclination is obvious in the song. The verse melody is similar to "Things" by Split Enz (1979).

== Release ==
Originally, the band planned to release "Don't Panic" as Parachutes' fourth single. However, it was abandoned after they deemed three singles were enough for an album. Following the successful single releases of the album in 2000, the band thought that Parachutes had gained enough exposure in significant regions in the United Kingdom. When they decided to release a fourth single, it would be for countries yet not "overdosed" by the hit singles "Yellow" and "Trouble". Coldplay and their record label, Parlophone, settled on "Don't Panic", which at the time was an audience favourite. The single was eventually released on 19 March 2001 in some European regions and on 30 April 2001 in Australia. The single is accompanied by the live tracks "You Only Live Twice", a cover of the Nancy Sinatra theme song for the James Bond film of the same name, and "Bigger Stronger", a song taken from the band's first EP release Safety; these live tracks were recorded during their performance at the Rockefeller Music Hall in Norway.

== Music video ==
The music video for "Don't Panic" was directed by Tim Hope. The video starts off with an animated diagram of the water cycle, then portrays the band as two-dimensional paper cutouts doing household chores, when suddenly disaster strikes the earth in the forms of floods, volcanoes and electric shocks. Like the music video for "Shiver", "Don't Panic" also features the yellow globe on the cover of Parachutes.

== Live performances ==
During the band's 2003 A Rush of Blood to the Head Tour, "Don't Panic" contained an entirely different introduction. In addition, Martin played the electric guitar and Buckland in harmonica solo during the bridge. He regularly threw the harmonica into the crowd after the solo. In 2001, a dance cover version of "Don't Panic" was released by Logo featuring Dawn Joseph.

During performances of "Don't Panic", Martin would stop the song after Buckland performs his verse and make him perform it a second time. Buckland jokingly stated in an interview with Business Times that he wanted the practice dropped, saying, "I don't think I would dread it so much if he didn't (sometimes) make me do it twice". Performances during 2017 legs of A Head Full of Dreams Tour would feature drummer Will Champion as lead vocalist.

== Usage in media ==
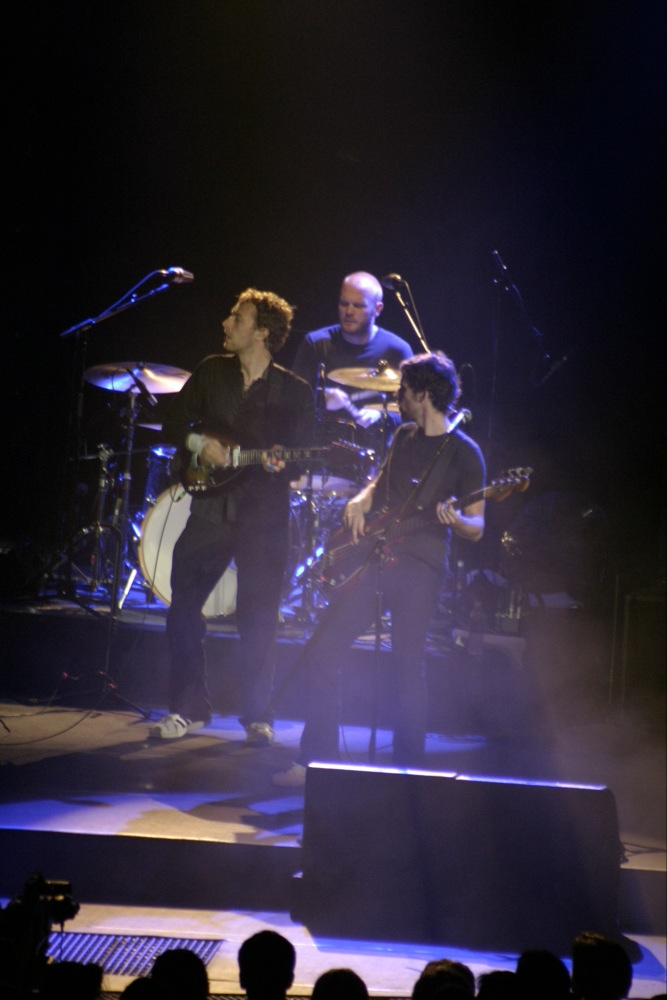
Coldplay performing "Don't Panic" live during the Twisted Logic Tour

Like their other songs, Coldplay has refused several offers to use "Don't Panic" for promotional tools. In 2004, the band rejected a multi-million-Euro offer from Diet Coke and Gap to use "Don't Panic" and "Trouble", another song featured in the album. The band asked then-manager Phil Harvey to not refer them to such offers because "a discussion might lead to compromise".

Despite this, the song has been used in many promotional tools and featured in several films and television series. In 2002, the song was featured in the comedy-drama film Igby Goes Down and later appeared on the film's soundtrack album, released on 25 February 2003 by Spun. Also in 2003, the song was also featured on Coldplay's live album Live 2003. In 2004, it was in the romantic comedy film Garden State; director Zach Braff handpicked songs, including "Don't Panic", for the film's Grammy Award–winning compilation album, Garden State: Music From The Motion Picture. The song was also featured on the debut episode of the FX television series Rescue Me as well as the pilot episode of the short-lived show Odyssey 5.

Additionally, the song was featured in episode nine of the first series on the British TV series Sugar Rush in 2005. On 19 July 2011, the song was played as a wake-up call to STS-135 Space Shuttle Atlantis Pilot Doug Hurley as a tribute from his wife and family, marking the last ever wake-up call for a crew visiting the International Space Station from the Space Shuttle fleet. It was also referenced in the 2016 movie The 5th Wave as a lullaby to the main character Cassie Sullivan (Chloë Grace Moretz)'s little brother Sam (Zackary Arthur). In February 2016, a cover of the song by Clairity was used in the trailer for the 2016 film X-Men: Apocalypse, as well as the film's TV spot for the Super Bowl 50. This same cover was used in the seventh season finale of The CW series The Vampire Diaries ("Gods and Monsters").

== Critical reception ==
Upon release, critics gave the song generally positive reviews. MacKenzie Wilson, in his review from AllMusic, notes, "Coldplay's indie rock inclinations are also obvious, especially on songs such as 'Don't Panic' and 'Shiver'". Spencer Owen from Pitchfork wrote that "This subdued, dreamy opener contains Martin's falsetto chorus of 'We live in a beautiful world,' which seems to sum up the overall sentiment of the record". Robert Christgau claimed that "Both the vocals and guitar are utterly beautiful. It's a song to take solace from, draw comfort from, be quietly awed by". David DeVoe of Hybrid Magazine said that "Don't Panic" is filled with "excellent guitar tones and a nice grooving back beat, and I love the way the song ends". In 2010, the song was included on The Xfm Top 1000 Songs of All Time book.

== Track listing ==
Main single

1. "Don't Panic" – 2:20
2. "You Only Live Twice" (live from Norway) – 4:06
3. "Bigger Stronger" (live from Norway) – 4:55

Denmark version

1. "Don't Panic" – 2:19
2. "Trouble" (live Fra Vega I Danmark) – 4:36
3. "Shiver" (live Fra Vega I Danmark) – 5:25
4. "Sparks" (live Fra Vega I Danmark) – 4:05

Netherlands version

1. "Don't Panic" – 2:20
2. "Spies" (live at Lowlands 2000) – 6:12
3. "Bigger Stronger" (live at Lowlands 2000) – 4:51
4. "Yellow" (live at Lowlands 2000) – 4:32

French version

1. "Don't Panic" – 2:20
2. "You Only Live Twice" (live from Norway) – 4:08
3. "Don't Panic" (OÜI FM Session Acoustique 102.3 FM) – 2:33

== Credits and personnel ==
- Chris Martin – lead vocals, acoustic guitar, piano, pump organ
- Jonny Buckland – lead guitar, vocals, slide guitar
- Guy Berryman – bass guitar
- Will Champion – drums, shaker

== Charts ==
Weekly chart performance
Chart (2001)	Peak position
Australia (ARIA)	57
Italy (FIMI)	47
Netherlands (Dutch Top 40 Tipparade)	15
Netherlands (Single Top 100)	83
UK Singles (OCC)	130

== Certifications ==
Certifications
Region	Certification	Certified units/sales
New Zealand (RMNZ)	Gold	15,000^{‡}
United Kingdom (BPI)	Silver	200,000^{‡}
^{‡} Sales+streaming figures based on certification alone.
