= Christmas Lights (song) =

2010 song by Coldplay

Single by Coldplay
- B-side: "Have Yourself a Merry Little Christmas"
- Written: December 2008
- Released: 1 December 2010
- Genre: Alternative rock; Christmas
- Length: 4:02
- Label: Parlophone; Capitol
- Songwriters: Guy Berryman; Jonny Buckland; Will Champion; Chris Martin
- Producers: Coldplay; Rik Simpson; Brian Eno

Coldplay singles chronology
| "Strawberry Swing" (2009) | "Christmas Lights" (2010) | "Every Teardrop Is a Waterfall" (2011) |

Music video
- "Christmas Lights" on YouTube

"Christmas Lights" is a song by British rock band Coldplay, released on 1 December 2010 as a digital download single. According to lead singer Chris Martin, it was written in December 2008. The morning after he began work on the single, he performed a segment of the still in-progress song for Steve Kroft during an interview for 60 Minutes that aired on 8 February 2009. The band described it as "a mid-tempo number in the key of G major". Yu Matsuoka Pol designed the cover art. Media outlets including Cosmopolitan, The Indian Express and The Telegraph praised "Christmas Lights" as one of the best holiday songs of all time.

== Release and promotion ==
The single's release date was announced through the official Coldplay website on 24 November 2010. A countdown in minutes and seconds to 1 December 8pm GMT, appeared on the homepage of the website, accompanied by an animated GIF of the album art.

Coldplay released three "making-of" videos through their iTunes Ping page, showing the creation of the music video. Another video was also released on their website, giving a preview of the music video and the song itself, plus more "making-of" footage. It was originally thought that "Christmas Lights" would be a song from the band's fifth studio album Mylo Xyloto, but this was confirmed not to be the case by Coldplay's official fan-question answer system The Oracle on two occasions.

For the week ending 18 December 2010, "Christmas Lights" both debuted and peaked at position number 25 on the U.S. Billboard Hot 100 singles chart and position number 12 on Billboard's Hot Digital Songs chart. A live recording of the song was also featured as the closer track on the band's Live from Spotify London EP, released exclusively on Spotify in December 2016. A physical release of "Christmas Lights" was released on 4 December 2020, to mark the song's tenth anniversary. It was made available in a limited-edition blue 7-inch vinyl with "Have Yourself a Merry Little Christmas" as its B-side. It reached number 1 in the UK's Official Vinyl Singles Chart in December 2020, and was the 15th best-selling vinyl single of 2021.

== Music video ==
Screenshot from the video

The discussions of plans for the song's music video started about one month before its release. The original plan was to film a simple video at Oxford Street, as the place is mentioned in the song's lyrics. After that, many other options were analysed, like a similar video to the Beatles' video for "All You Need Is Love", with the band and friends at the studio, but that idea was left out as Coldplay were in the middle of the production of Mylo Xyloto, and that could disrupt the flow of the recording. Another idea for the video included filming at the Willesden Music Hall. Finally, they decided to invite the designer Misty Buckley to the project and the ideas for the final video began to take shape. After a meeting at the studio called The Bakery, all the ideas had been set up and the only thing missing was the location for the shooting. Some places suggested were the tunnels under Waterloo and the roof of John Lewis. However, they opted for the South Bank just five days before the shooting of the video, to tie in a line about the meeting of the sea and the city.

Coldplay began filming the music video on 24 November. The video appears to be one continuous shot, and while it might have been filmed with a single camera, the amount of takes in the video is unknown. Whether this means the finished product is a mix of many clips seamlessly stitched together is unknown. It begins with the starting up of a record player, and the camera panning across a multicoloured player piano, then the four members of the band lying on a wooden floor. Martin begins to sing the first verse as the camera pans and zooms out to show the piano — which is now next to him — and then back. Martin has changed his position, and the rest of the band are now nowhere to be seen. Martin rises up from the floor, then begins to play the piano, which is revealed to be on an outdoor stage in front of the Thames. Curtains open to reveal the rest of the band, who join in playing the song, accompanied by fireworks and three violin-playing Elvis impersonators (who are played by friends of the band: actor Simon Pegg, the "fifth member" of Coldplay Phil Harvey, and Tim Crompton - friend of the band and frontman of The High Wire). One hundred fans of the band appear in the music video; they release coloured balloons from a boat on the Thames whilst singing along to part of the song. "Credo Elvem Etiam Vivere" is written across the top of the stage. In Latin this means "I Believe Elvis Yet Lives". This is likely connected to the three Elvises appearing in the video, which is, in turn, connected to the lyrics of the song.

The video was directed by Mat Whitecross, a long-time friend of the band and director of several of Coldplay's other music videos, such as "Bigger Stronger", "Lovers in Japan", "Paradise", and subsequently "Adventure of a Lifetime", as well as the 2018 documentary Coldplay: A Head Full of Dreams. Just hours after the release of the video it was removed from YouTube after the IFPI claimed a breach of copyright, despite the video being on one of Coldplay's official channels. However, it was eventually uploaded once again.

== Rankings ==
List of critic rankings
| Publication | Year | Description | Result | Ref. |
|---|---|---|---|---|
| BBC Sounds | 2024 | 25 Years of Great Christmas Songs | 4 | |
| Billboard | 2017 | The Best Holiday Song from Each of the Last 50 Years | Placed | |
| Billboard | 2025 | The 30 Best Christmas Songs of the 21st Century | 18 | |
| CKBE-FM | 2022 | 100 Best Christmas Songs of All Time | 46 | |
| Cleveland | 2014 | 23 Best Christmas Songs Since 2000 | Placed | |
| Cosmopolitan | 2024 | The 80 Best Christmas Songs of All Time | 62 | |
| Glamour UK | 2022 | The Best Christmas Songs of All Time | Placed | |
| The Indian Express | 2024 | 10 Best Christmas Songs of All Time | 10 | |
| Slant | 2025 | The 21 Best Christmas Songs of the 21st Century | 4 | |
| St. Albert Gazette | 2023 | The 25 Best Christmas Songs of All Time | 24 | |
| The Telegraph | 2025 | The 100 Best Christmas Songs of All Time | 37 | |
| The University Observer | 2018 | The Best Christmas Songs of All Time | Placed | |
| Vanity Fair Italy | 2024 | The Most Beautiful Christmas Songs | Placed | |
| Woman's Day | 2019 | The 62 Best Christmas Songs of All Time | 28 | |

== Cover versions ==
- Yellowcard recorded the song for the Fearless 2013 compilation Punk Goes Christmas.
- Kylie Minogue recorded the song for her 2016 album Kylie Christmas: Snow Queen Edition.
- Straight No Chaser covered the song for their 2016 album I'll Have Another... Christmas Album.

== Track listing ==
Digital download
| No. | Title | Length |
|---|---|---|
| 1. | "Christmas Lights" | 4:02 |

Limited-edition blue 7-inch vinyl
| No. | Title | Length |
|---|---|---|
| 1. | "Christmas Lights" | 4:02 |
| 2. | "Have Yourself a Merry Little Christmas" (Jo Whiley, BBC Radio 1 Session) | 2:19 |

== Personnel ==
- Chris Martin – vocals, piano
- Jonny Buckland – guitar
- Guy Berryman – bass guitar
- Will Champion – drums, percussion, backing vocals

== Charts ==
=== Weekly charts ===
Weekly chart performance
| Chart (2010–2026) | Peak position |
|---|---|
| Australia (ARIA) | 32 |
| Austria (Ö3 Austria Top 40) | 17 |
| Belgium (Ultratop 50 Flanders) | 9 |
| Belgium (Ultratop 50 Wallonia) | 8 |
| Canada Hot 100 (Billboard) | 18 |
| Czech Republic Singles Digital (ČNS IFPI) | 52 |
| Denmark (Tracklisten) | 10 |
| Finland (Suomen virallinen lista) | 3 |
| France (SNEP) | 182 |
| Germany (GfK) | 24 |
| Global 200 (Billboard) | 68 |
| Hungary (Single Top 40) | 1 |
| Hungary (Stream Top 40) | 22 |
| Iceland (RÚV) | 4 |
| Ireland (IRMA) | 15 |
| Italy (FIMI) | 2 |
| Latvia (DigiTop100) | 56 |
| Lithuania (AGATA) | 74 |
| Mexico Ingles Airplay | 21 |
| Netherlands (Single Top 100) | 2 |
| New Zealand (Recorded Music NZ) | 34 |
| Norway (VG-lista) | 8 |
| Poland (Polish Streaming Top 100) | 69 |
| Portugal (AFP) | 109 |
| Slovakia Singles Digital (ČNS IFPI) | 71 |
| South Korea V Coloring (Circle) | 73 |
| Spain (Promusicae) | 14 |
| Sweden (Sverigetopplistan) | 19 |
| Switzerland (Schweizer Hitparade) | 10 |
| UK Singles (Official Charts) | 13 |
| US Billboard Hot 100 | 25 |
| US Adult Contemporary (Billboard) | 11 |
| US Rock & Alternative Airplay (Billboard) | 46 |
| US Hot Rock & Alternative Songs (Billboard) | 29 |

=== Year-end charts ===
Year-end chart performance
| Chart (2010) | Position |
|---|---|
| Italy (FIMI) | 97 |
| Netherlands (Single Top 100) | 97 |

| Chart (2020) | Position |
|---|---|
| Hungary (Single Top 40) | 44 |
| UK Vinyl Singles (OCC) | 9 |

| Chart (2021) | Position |
|---|---|
| UK Vinyl Singles (OCC) | 15 |
| US Adult Contemporary (Billboard) | 48 |

== Certifications ==
Certifications
| Region | Certification | Certified units/sales |
|---|---|---|
| Australia (ARIA) | Platinum | 70,000^{‡} |
| Denmark (IFPI Danmark) | Platinum | 90,000^{‡} |
| Germany (BVMI) | Platinum | 300,000^{‡} |
| Italy (FIMI) | Platinum | 70,000^{‡} |
| New Zealand (RMNZ) | Platinum | 30,000^{‡} |
| Portugal (AFP) | Gold | 12,000^{‡} |
| United Kingdom (BPI) | 2× Platinum | 1,200,000^{‡} |
^{‡} Sales+streaming figures based on certification alone.

== Release history ==
Release dates and formats
| Region | Date | Format | Label | Ref. |
|---|---|---|---|---|
| Various | 1 December 2010 | Digital download | Parlophone | |
| Various | 4 December 2020 | 7-inch vinyl | Parlophone | |
