= Yellow (Coldplay song) =

2000 single by Coldplay

Single by Coldplay

from the album Parachutes
- B-side: "Help Is Round the Corner"; "No More Keeping My Feet on the Ground"
- Released: 26 June 2000
- Recorded: November 1999 – May 2000
- Studio: Rockfield (Rockfield)
- Genre: Alternative rock; pop rock; post-Britpop
- Length: 4:29
- Label: Parlophone; Nettwerk
- Songwriters: Chris Martin; Jonny Buckland; Guy Berryman; Will Champion
- Producers: Ken Nelson; Coldplay

Coldplay singles chronology
"Shiver" (2000)	"Yellow" (2000)	"Trouble" (2000)

Music video
- "Yellow" on YouTube

"Yellow" is a song by the British rock band Coldplay from their debut studio album, Parachutes (2000). The song was written by band members Chris Martin, Jonny Buckland, Guy Berryman, and Will Champion, and co-produced it with British record producer Ken Nelson. "Yellow" is an alternative rock, post-Britpop, and pop rock song, lyrically discussing the mood of the band, which was described by Martin as "brightness, hope, and devotion".

"Yellow" was released as the second single from Parachutes on 26 June 2000, following "Shiver", and as the lead single in the United States in November 2000. It reached number four on the UK Singles Chart, giving Coldplay their first top-five hit in the United Kingdom. It was Coldplay's breakthrough hit internationally, reaching number one in Iceland, number five in Australia, number nine in Ireland and number 48 in the United States, helped by radio rotation and usage in television and movies.

A music video for the song was filmed at Studland Bay in May 2000, and features Martin walking along the beach singing "Yellow", with no cuts present. "Yellow" received positive reviews from critics, and has been deemed a significant standout in Coldplay's discography. Coldplay has included the song on the set lists of their various live performances, and has since been covered by various recording artists worldwide, and remains one of the band's most popular songs.

== Background and inspiration ==
"Yellow" was written in Rockfield's Quadrangle studio near Monmouth in Wales, where Coldplay began working on their debut album, Parachutes. One night after finishing recording "Shiver", the band took a break and went out of the studio. Outside, there were few lights on and the stars in the sky were visible and "just amazing", according to the song's co-producer, Ken Nelson. He told the band to look at the stars, which they did. Lead singer Chris Martin was inspired by the sight and the song's main melody, consisting of a chord pattern, popped into his head. At first, Martin did not take it seriously and sang the tune to the rest of the band in "his worst Neil Young impersonation voice". Martin has said, "The song had the word 'stars' and that seemed like a word you should sing in a Neil Young voice." The melody "started off a lot slower", according to drummer Will Champion, and it sounded like a Neil Young song. Not long after, despite not taking the song seriously, Martin's idea worked out when he had developed the tempo of the verse. When guitarist Jonny Buckland started playing it and supplemented it with his ideas, they had created the riff, "and it sort of got a bit heavier".

While composing the song's lyrics, Martin could not find the right words. He was thinking of a specific word, which he deemed a missing keyword in the lyrics, to fit the song's concept. He looked around the studio and saw the Yellow pages. The lyrics progressed from there, with the band collaborating. Bassist Guy Berryman came up with the opening line "Look at the stars". That night, having quickly composed the song, the band recorded it.

On The Howard Stern Show in November 2011, Chris Martin explained to Howard Stern that he was impersonating Neil Young while entertaining guests when he came across the first chord of the song, which stuck with him for a bit; then in a Neil Young voice he sang "look at the stars". Martin went on to further explain that the word "yellow" has absolutely no meaning whatsoever and while writing the rest of the song he tried his best to change "yellow" to something else since every lyric before yellow made no sense but in the end the word "yellow" just sounded right. Martin also told Stern that through the years depending on the attitude and manner of whoever interviews him, he would make up some story about a song or album titles just to move on to the next question. Martin applauded Stern, saying "I like you, Howard, so that's the first time I've ever told anyone the truth behind 'Yellow'." When asked if the song was about a particular girl, Chris Martin said "It’s about all girls."

== Recording and production ==
The band and Nelson produced the track. Nelson was acquainted with the band's music through the former's manager. Nelson's manager gave him a copy of Coldplay's 1999 EP The Blue Room and single "Brothers & Sisters", and showed interest in working with them after seeing the band perform live. "Yellow" was initially recorded upstairs in the project studio, basically a demo room in Liverpool's Parr Street Studios. The track was later mixed in New York City.

Nelson and the band encountered problems in producing some aspects of the song. According to Champion, "... it was really difficult to record because it worked at about five or six different tempos. It was a tough choice of choosing which tempo to play, because sometimes it sounded too rushed, and sometimes it sounded as if it was dragging..." The band was trying to get the right tempo, according to Nelson, "because a beat either side of the tempo we picked didn't have the same groove". To improve the song, they recorded this part live and Buckland overdubbed his guitar. They recorded it two or three times until Nelson and the band were happy at the output. The backing vocals were recorded in the control room of Quadrangle.

Nelson used an analogue 2-inch type tape in recording most of the tracks on the album. As the recording progressed, "Yellow" was one of a couple of songs that they "couldn't quite get on analogue". They recorded different versions but it did not satisfy their taste. So Nelson used Pro Tools "to get the feel of [the track] just right"; once all takes were recorded into the computer, "we then put it down to the 2-inch, which I found was a great way to do it", according to Nelson.

== Composition ==
Yellow
Sample of "Yellow" from Coldplay's 2000 album Parachutes.

"Yellow" has been called an alternative rock, post-Britpop, and pop rock song. Martin has explained, "'Yellow' refers to the mood of the band. Brightness and hope and devotion." The references in some of the lyrics, including swimming and drawing a line, "are all metaphorical slants on the extent of his emotional devotion". The drawing of a line refers to Martin's habit of writing lists, and underlining those important things on the list. Martin has commented that the song is about devotion, referring to his unrequited love for someone or something. Despite its lyrical theme, many fans have considered "Yellow" to be an upbeat track, although it is often interpreted as melancholy as well. The song is written in the key of B major with a tempo of 88 beats per minute.

== Release ==
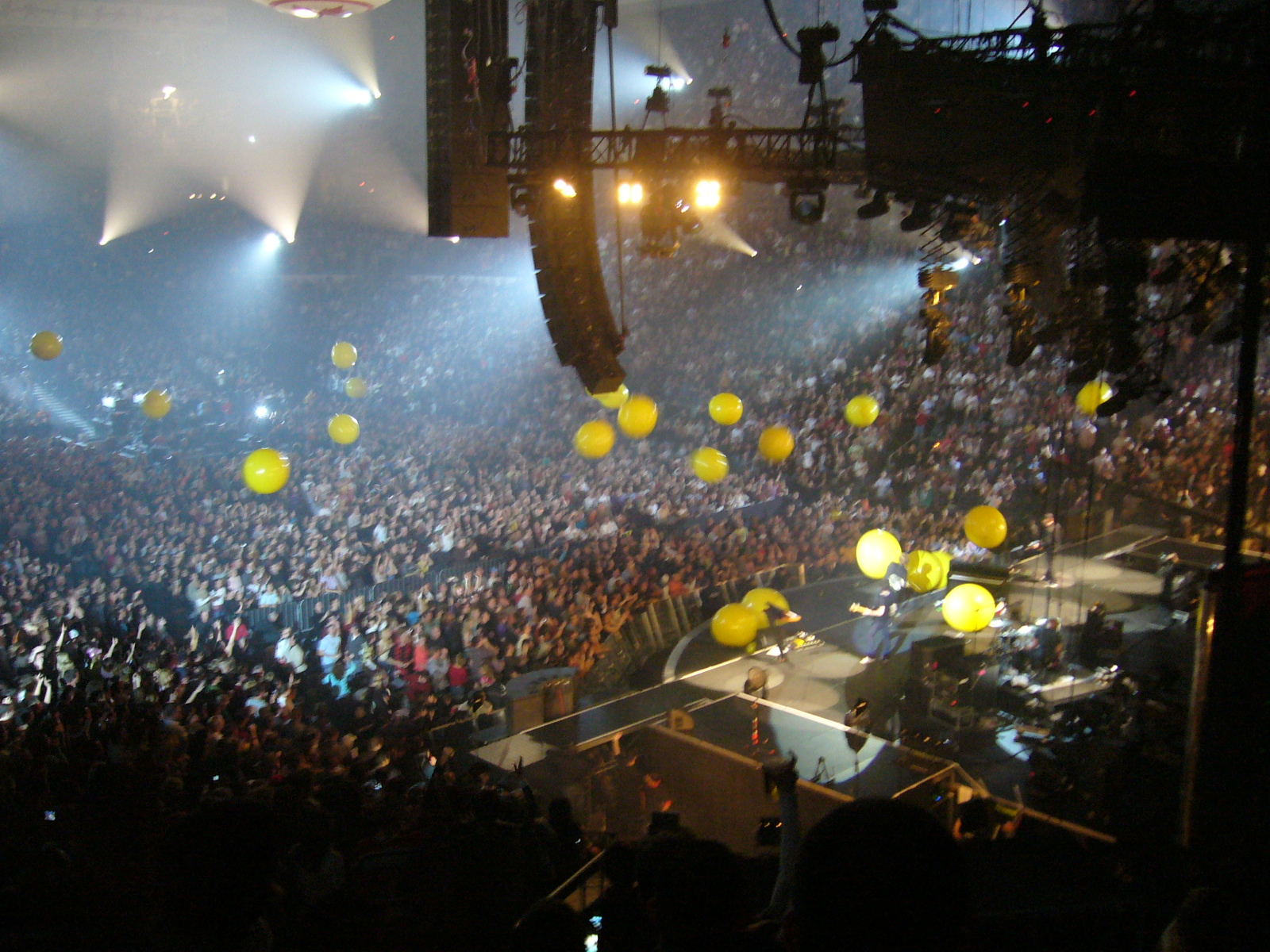
Coldplay performing "Yellow" in 2005

"Yellow" and "Shiver" were initially released as EPs in the spring of 2000 along with the songs "Help Is Round the Corner" and "No More Keeping My Feet on the Ground", the third taken from the band's debut 1998 EP, Safety. In the United States, it was released as the lead single from the album. In October 2000, the track was sent to US college and alternative radio outlets. The band released a limited-edition CD, Mince Spies, which features a remix of "Yellow". It was pressed to 1,000 copies and issued only to fans and journalists.

The single, accompanied by its TV reception through its music video, received massive radio airplay, particularly at BBC Radio 1. The reaction was chiefly positive and even the newly revitalised BBC Radio 2 played the track repeatedly. This heavy rotation continued for months after its release, eventually ending as 2000's most-aired song. A month after the album was released in the United States via record label Nettwerk, "Yellow" was used as the theme song for ABC autumn television promotions. The song was also used as the theme music for The Cancer Council Australia's "Daffodil Day", in recognition of that organisation's official flower's yellow hue.

== Critical reception ==
=== Reviews ===
The song received critical acclaim. Matt Diehl of Rolling Stone has noted "Yellow" is "unrepentantly romantic", adding that "the band creates a hypnotic slo-mo otherworld where spirit rules supreme". "Yellow" has also won Best Single at the 2001 NME Awards and got nominated at the 2002 44th Annual Grammy Awards for Best Rock Song and Best Rock Performance by a Duo or Group with Vocal. Billboard said that "every time that electric-guitar riff barges in, you're hooked all over again." In October 2011, NME placed it at number 139 on their "150 Best Tracks of the Past 15 Years" list. In a retrospective article from 2020, The Independent praised the band for how the song "made being heartfelt seem effortless". In 2021, Billboard included "Yellow" at 35th place in their "Greatest Songs of 2001" list.

The song is regarded as a career-making record by Rolling Stone magazine and has since been considered the centrepiece of the Parachutes album. Martin Roach claimed in his book Coldplay: Nobody Said It Was Easy that although "Shiver" earned the band their first UK Top 40 single, it was "Yellow" that changed "everything"; he also mentioned how the track "exemplifies much of what made [them] popular". In a 20th-anniversary article, The Independent credited the song for altering the course of 21st-century rock, given how it was responsible for beginning Coldplay's trajectory as one of the biggest bands in the world. Similarly, the Rock and Roll Hall of Fame included "Yellow" on their "Songs That Shaped Rock and Roll" list for being one of the most successful and important recordings in music.

Barry Walters from Spin magazine noted that Coldplay is still known in the United States for their "surprise smash". The track is considered one of the best from the 2000s decade by Pitchfork, being also listed amongst the best of all time by NME on their 2014 list. In the same year, the song was featured in Richard Linklater's film Boyhood. In 2020, NME ranked "Yellow" the number one greatest among a list of all 142 Coldplay songs (up to that point); and in 2021, American Songwriter ranked the song number three on their list of the 10 greatest Coldplay songs. The Savannah Bananas exhibition baseball team has played "Yellow" after the eighth inning of every game since 2023.

=== Rankings ===
List of critic rankings
Publication	Year	Description	Result	Ref.
Billboard	2021	The 100 Greatest Songs of 2001	35	
Blender	2005	Top 500 Songs of the 1980s–2000s	500	
The Guardian	2009	1000 Songs Everyone Must Hear	Placed	
The Guardian	2011	50 Key Events in the History of Rock Music	47	
The i Paper	2025	The 50 Best Love Songs of the 21st Century	1	
KROQ-FM	2024	Top 500 Songs from the Last 30 Years	279	
MTV Australia	2013	The Official Top 1000 All Time Classics	Placed	
NME	2005	75 Tunes That Defined Rock and Roll	Placed	
NME	2006	The Greatest Tracks of the Decade (1996–2006)	31	
NME	2014	The 500 Greatest Songs of All Time	420	
NPO Radio 2	2025	Top 2000	44	
Pitchfork	2009	The Top 500 Tracks of the 2000s	263	
PopMatters	2002	Best Music Videos of 2001	Placed	
Q	2006	100 Greatest Songs of All Time	64	
Radio X	2010	The Xfm Top 1000 Songs of All Time	Placed	
Radio X	2026	Best of British 500	96	
Rock and Roll Hall of Fame	2011	The Songs That Shaped Rock and Roll	Placed	
Rolling Stone	2011	100 Best Songs of the 2000s	34	
Rolling Stone	2026	The 200 Greatest Rock Songs of the 21st Century	24	
RTÉ Gold	2023	Top 100 First Hits	46	
Select	2000	Best Songs of 2000	1	
The Telegraph	2018	100 Pop Songs That Defined the Noughties	4	
The Village Voice	2001	Pazz & Jop Critics Poll	5	
WYEP-FM	2020	Greatest Songs of the Past 30 Years	Placed	
Yardbarker	2024	The Best Pop Songs of the 2000s	22	

== Chart performance ==
In the United Kingdom, its midweek sales suggested that the single would reach the Top 10 of the chart. Although the band supposed "Yellow" would decline inside the Top 20, they would have considered its performance a triumph since the album's lead single, "Shiver", had only reached the 35th position. "Yellow"'s second-week sales were stronger than the first week, and the song eventually reached number four, giving the band their first Top 10 single in the United Kingdom. The popularity of the song in British clubs, pubs and sporting events bolstered the album to debut at number one on the UK Albums Chart. As of February 2015, the song has sold 530,000 copies in the UK.

"Yellow" achieved popularity in the United States and was Coldplay's first American hit. The single charted on eight different Billboard singles charts; it also topped various US modern-rock radio playlists in the spring of 2001. The single performed as it did in Europe and has helped Parachutes be certified gold by the Recording Industry Association of America during the single's stay on the chart. As of October 2014, the song has sold over 2 million copies in the US.

After Coldplay's appearance at Sound Relief in Australia, in the charting week starting 22 March 2009, the single made a return to the Australian ARIA Top 50 at number 48. In the week starting 27 November 2023, the single once again returned to the same charts, entering at number 42. In 2024, PPL ranked "Yellow" as the band's seventh-most played song across British media. A year later, the track was placed at number 197 on the list of most streamed songs of all time on Apple Music.

== Music video ==
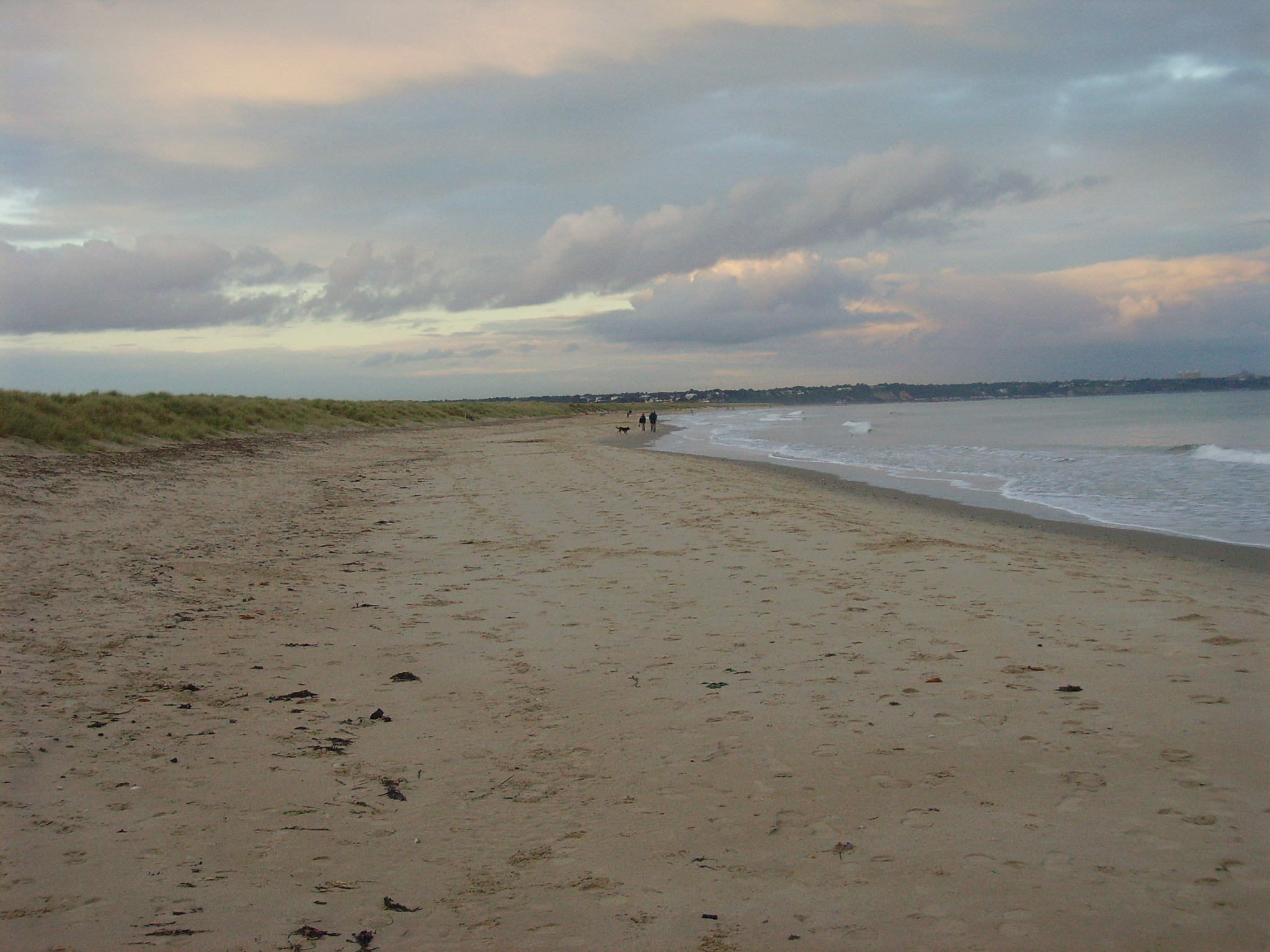
The beach at Studland Bay

The music video for "Yellow" was filmed at Studland Bay in the county of Dorset, South West England on 23 May 2000. The video is minimalistic, featuring only Martin singing the song as he walks along the beach. He is seen wearing a set of waterproofs with his hair wet. The video is one continuous shot with no cuts. The entire sequence is in slow motion.

Originally, it had been intended for the whole band to appear in the video. However, drummer Will Champion's mother Sara Champion's funeral was being held on the day of filming, so it was decided that only Martin would appear in the video, which was also the immediate explanation of his mood during this part. The weather also opposed the original plan, with harsh winds and rain instead of the sunny day that had been envisioned. It had also been originally intended for there to be moving stars in the sky, as if in a time-lapse. The directors agreed that the moving stars would distract the focus of the video from Martin. The plan of time advancing was kept. The video begins with the beach being somewhat dark until sunlight arrives nearly at the video's midway point. The video was directed by British directing duo James Frost & Alex Smith of The Artists Company.

In 2022, Canadian duo Tegan and Sara paid homage to the music video for their new single, also called "Yellow". In the video, the pair walk in slow motion along a beach in rain clothes as the sun rises behind them. Two years later, British band IDLES used the video for the song "Grace" with Martin singing their song through the use of Deepfake AI. Martin approved the music video and helped the group to train their AI model.

== Live performances ==
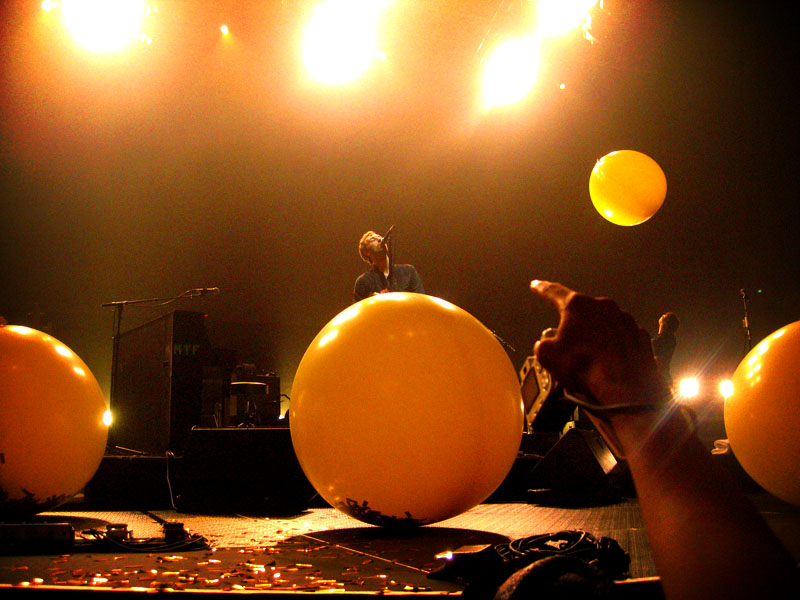
Coldplay performing "Yellow" in 2006 during the Twisted Logic tour, with yellow balloons falling

Coldplay have performed the song throughout their career, and it is a firm audience favourite. An early version of the song with different lyric arrangement and instrumentals was performed during the band's NME Tour in January 2000. The song had its debut performance on television on the show Later... with Jools Holland on 6 May 2000. They performed Parachutes' lead single, "Shiver", and the new song, "Yellow"; but it was the latter that had an immediate studio audience impact. They have also performed it at the Glastonbury Festival, one of the prominent festivals in Europe. During their second appearance in June 2000, Coldplay performed "Yellow" and "effortlessly" captured over 10,000 spectators. Coldplay's popularity at this time was still growing and "Yellow" has helped cultivate it; Martin has said it was the best day of their year. During most concert performances, large yellow balloons are dropped on the audience. The first known sighting of yellow balloons was on 24 September 2002 at the UIC Pavilion in Chicago. Chris Martin noticed the balloons in the air with a surprised look. In more recent years, (January 2013) the balloons are filled with confetti, and at the end of the song Chris Martin would pop one with his guitar causing confetti to fly everywhere.

A live acoustic version performed on Jo Whiley's The Lunchtime Social was included on the Acoustic EP. Another live version featuring only piano and vocals performed and broadcast in Los Angeles on KCRW's Morning Becomes Eclectic was included on the Japanese "Clocks" EP. More recently an acoustic piano version the song was recorded in the studio for Starbucks charity compilation album Every Mother Counts 2012.

Coldplay performed the song at the Celebrating Steve event at the Apple campus on 19 October 2011. Before the performance, Martin revealed that, when they first played it for Steve Jobs 10 years ago, Jobs said the song was "shit" and that "they would never make it". The song was later performed on 7 July at the G20 summit in Hamburg, Germany, with guest vocals from Shakira.

Martin performed a rearranged version of the song acoustically and unaccompanied via video link for the late Australian cricketer Shane Warne's memorial service, as it was one of his favourite songs. Warne was a personal friend of Martin, and he had previously accompanied Coldplay for a live performance of "Don't Panic" on the harmonica during a Melbourne concert in 2016.

Ahead of Coldplay's headline performance at BBC Radio 1's Big Weekend in Luton on 26 May 2024, a local campaign was started encouraging a change in the lyrics from "Yellow" to "Orange": while Luton Town F.C. play in orange, their local rivals Watford F.C. wear yellow. Instead, Coldplay retained the original lyrics during the song's performance but Chris Martin also premiered a new song to close the show called "Orange" in tribute to Luton Town F.C. which he had written the previous day.

== Usage in media ==
"Yellow" has been covered by many musicians across languages and musical styles.

- A Mandarin Chinese cover by Katherine Ho featured in the 2018 movie Crazy Rich Asians. Both Warner Bros. and Coldplay were initially opposed to using the song, but director Jon M. Chu convinced them otherwise, adding that "a white director couldn't do it," but he could. Coldplay were convinced after Chu wrote a moving letter to the band.
- In 2019, Jodie Whittaker covered "Yellow" for the BBC Children in Need album Got it Covered, assisted by Will Champion and Jonny Buckland.
- Lizzo sampled "Yellow" on her song "Coldplay" from her 2022 studio album Special.
- Australian rock band King Stingray covered "Yellow" on triple J's Like a Version in 2022. The song later ranked in at number 43 on that year's Triple J Hottest 100.
- In 2024, an orchestral version of "Yellow", performed by the Vitamin String Quartet, was featured on the third season of Netflix series Bridgerton.

== Track listings ==
CD single
No.	Title	Length
1.	"Yellow"	4:31
2.	"Help Is Round the Corner"	2:36
3.	"No More Keeping My Feet on the Ground" (taken from the Safety E.P., May 1998)	4:31

7-inch and cassette single
No.	Title	Length
1.	"Yellow"	4:31
2.	"Help Is Round the Corner"	2:36

== Personnel ==
- Chris Martin – vocals, acoustic guitar, keyboard, electric guitar
- Jonny Buckland – electric guitar
- Guy Berryman – bass guitar
- Will Champion – drums, percussion, tambourine

== Charts ==
=== Weekly charts ===
Weekly chart performance in the 2000s
Chart (2000–2001)	Peak position
Australia (ARIA)	5
Canada CHR (Nielsen BDS)	20
Europe (Eurochart Hot 100)	20
France (SNEP)	96
Iceland (Íslenski Listinn Topp 40)	1
Ireland (IRMA)	9
Netherlands (Dutch Top 40 Tipparade)	11
Netherlands (Single Top 100)	82
New Zealand (Recorded Music NZ)	23
Scottish Singles Sales (Official Charts)	4
UK Singles (Official Charts)	4
US Billboard Hot 100	48
US Adult Alternative Airplay (Billboard)	2
US Adult Pop Airplay (Billboard)	11
US Alternative Airplay (Billboard)	6
US Pop Airplay (Billboard)	22

Weekly chart performance in the 2010s
Chart (2017)	Peak position
South Korea International (Gaon)	22
Sweden Heatseeker (Sverigetopplistan)	7
UK Singles (Official Charts)	59

Weekly chart performance in the 2020s
Chart (2021–2025)	Peak position
Argentina Hot 100 (Billboard)	33
Australia (ARIA)	14
Austria (Ö3 Austria Top 40)	5
Finland (Suomen virallinen lista)	13
Germany (GfK)	99
Global 200 (Billboard)	37
Greece International (IFPI)	11
Hong Kong (Billboard)	9
India International (IMI)	2
Indonesia (Billboard)	8
Israel (Mako Hitlist)	87
Italy (FIMI)	82
Malaysia (Billboard)	5
Malaysia International (RIM)	1
Netherlands (Single Top 100)	38
Peru (Billboard)	25
Philippines (Billboard)	10
Philippines (Philippines Hot 100)	35
Portugal (AFP)	6
Russia Streaming (TopHit)	100
Singapore (RIAS)	1
South Korea BGM (Circle)	112
South Korea Download (Circle)	176
Spain (PROMUSICAE)	59
Sweden (Sverigetopplistan)	70
Switzerland (Schweizer Hitparade)	16
Taiwan (Billboard)	10
United Arab Emirates (IFPI)	6
UK Singles (Official Charts)	19
US Hot Rock & Alternative Songs (Billboard)	13

=== Monthly charts ===
Monthly chart performance
Chart (2017)	Peak position
South Korea International (Gaon)	65

=== Year-end charts ===
Year-end chart performance
Chart (2000)	Position
Iceland (Íslenski Listinn Topp 40)	20
Ireland (IRMA)	42
UK Singles (OCC)	93

Chart (2001)	Position
Australia (ARIA)	33
Canada Radio (Nielsen BDS)	29
US Adult Top 40 (Billboard)	29
US Modern Rock Tracks (Billboard)	18
US Triple-A (Billboard)	2

Chart (2021)	Position
Global 200 (Billboard)	171
Portugal Streaming (AFP)	200

Chart (2022)	Position
Global 200 (Billboard)	74
Portugal (AFP)	71
UK Singles (OCC)	88

Chart (2023)	Position
Brazil Streaming (Pro-Música Brasil)	186
Global 200 (Billboard)	70
UK Singles (OCC)	81

Chart (2024)	Position
Australia (ARIA)	78
Global 200 (Billboard)	68
Philippines (Philippines Hot 100)	51
Portugal (AFP)	127
UK Singles (OCC)	67

Chart (2025)	Position
Australia (ARIA)	88
Belgium (Ultratop 50 Flanders)	170
Global 200 (Billboard)	40
Philippines (Philippines Hot 100)	53
UK Singles (OCC)	59

== Certifications and sales ==
Certifications and sales
Region	Certification	Certified units/sales
Australia (ARIA)	9× Platinum	630,000^{‡}
Austria (IFPI Austria)	4× Platinum	200,000^{*}
Denmark (IFPI Danmark)	2× Platinum	180,000^{‡}
Germany (BVMI)	Platinum	600,000^{‡}
Italy (FIMI) Sales since 2009	3× Platinum	300,000^{‡}
New Zealand (RMNZ)	9× Platinum	270,000^{‡}
Portugal (AFP)	7× Platinum	70,000^{‡}
Spain (Promusicae)	4× Platinum	240,000^{‡}
United Kingdom (BPI)	6× Platinum	3,641,555 (Note: British total sales for "Yellow" as of September 2025.)
United States (RIAA)	4× Platinum	4,000,000^{‡}
^{*} Sales figures based on certification alone.^{‡} Sales+streaming figures based on certification alone.

== Release history ==
Release dates and formats
Region	Date	Format	Label	Ref.
United Kingdom	26 June 2000	7-inch vinyl; CD; cassette	Parlophone	
Belgium	26 June 2000	CD	Parlophone	
France	26 June 2000	CD	Parlophone	
Norway	26 June 2000	CD	Parlophone	
Italy	30 June 2000	CD	Parlophone	
Finland	3 July 2000	CD	Parlophone	
Greece	3 July 2000	CD	Parlophone	
Netherlands	3 July 2000	CD	Parlophone	
Sweden	3 July 2000	CD	Parlophone	
United States	7 November 2000	Alternative radio	Nettwerk; Capitol	
Australia	27 November 2000	CD	Parlophone	
United States	20 February 2001	Contemporary hit radio	Nettwerk; Capitol	

== See also ==
- List of best-selling singles in the United Kingdom
- List of number-one songs of 2023 (Malaysia)
- List of number-one songs of 2024 (Singapore)
- List of UK top-ten singles in 2000

== Bibliography ==
- Roach, Martin (2003). Coldplay: Nobody Said it was Easy. Omnibus. ISBN 0-7119-9810-8.
