= Trouble (Coldplay song) =

2000 single by Coldplay

Single by Coldplay

from the album Parachutes
- B-side: "Brothers and Sisters"
- Released: 23 October 2000
- Recorded: November 1999 – May 2000
- Genre: Alternative rock
- Length: 4:30 (album version); 4:33 (single version); 21:20 (Norwegian Live EP)
- Label: Parlophone; Nettwerk
- Songwriters: Guy Berryman; Jonny Buckland; Will Champion; Chris Martin
- Producers: Ken Nelson; Coldplay

Coldplay singles chronology
"Yellow" (2000)	"Trouble" (2000)	"Don't Panic" (2001)

Norwegian Live EP cover

Coldplay EP chronology
Acoustic (2000)	Trouble – Norwegian Live EP (2001)	Mince Spies (2001)

Music video
- "Trouble" (US version) on YouTube

"Trouble" is a song by British rock band Coldplay, for their debut album, Parachutes (2000). The band wrote and co-produced it with British record producer Ken Nelson. The song's arrangement is built around the acoustic piano. It was released on 23 October 2000 as the album's third single, reaching number 10 on the UK Singles Chart and becoming the band's second top 10 single in the country. Although "Trouble" failed to chart in the United States, the music press deemed it almost as successful as its predecessor, "Yellow".

Two different music videos were released: one for Europe and another for the United States, which is currently the only one available on the band's YouTube channel. There is also an associated release named Trouble – Norwegian Live EP, which came out on 5 February 2001 and consisted of five tracks recorded by the band at Rockefeller Music Hall in Oslo. It was released exclusively in Norway, being Coldplay's fourth extended play and first live release.

== Production ==
According to Coldplay's lead singer Chris Martin, the song's writing was inspired by his own behaviour. Martin recalls, "There were some bad things going in our band... the song is about behaving badly towards somebody you really love and I was certainly doing that to some members of the band." He added that he supposed it was about time to stop acting like a knobhead. The four members of Coldplay are credited as co-writers of "Trouble".

British record producer Ken Nelson and the band produced "Trouble" for their debut album, Parachutes. The track was recorded four times before the band got the take they preferred. The backing track was first recorded, and each time they add to see if it was working. However, they decided that the first three versions were not "working". The last take was recorded into Pro Tools with a shaker to provide the rhythm to the track. For the backing track, Will Champion played the drums and Martin on the piano which they recorded in a little wooden room. After Guy Berryman's bass was recorded, guitarist Jonny Buckland added the guitar section. In recording the piano section of the track, the band used two microphones—one was brighter-sounding and the other had a fuller sound. Nelson, who wanted to keep the song simple, chose the fuller sound microphone for the mixing.

"Trouble" was mixed in New York by American mix engineer Michael Brauer. The initial mixed version, which was sent back to the band and Nelson, fell short of their desired quality, so it had to be redone. According to Nelson, "the vocal was overcompressed and the piano was too bright". Despite this, Nelson did not blame Brauer because he was recording the album when the track was being mixed.

== Composition ==
The song's lyrics have "softer emotional themes", including apologies, unrequited love, and longing. Its musicscape follows the minimalistic approach. "Trouble" is built around a piano, with a snare drum background that was mixed very low. The snare drum section tends to be inaudible when the guitars come in. According to the sheet music published by Musicnotes, Inc., the song's time signature follows the common 4/4, with a tempo of 70 beats per minute. It is written in the key of G major. Martin's vocal range in the song spans from F♯_{3} to A_{4}, the highest note being sung using the falsetto register, despite the fact Martin can reach this note in full voice.

== Release ==
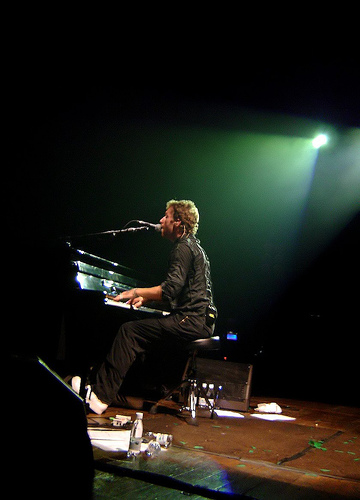
Chris Martin playing "Trouble" on his piano during a concert in Brazil, February 2007

"Trouble" was released as the third single off Parachutes on 23 October 2000 in the United Kingdom and on 30 July 2001 in the United States. An associated extended play titled Trouble – Norwegian Live EP was released on 5 February 2001. In 2003, the song was featured on Coldplay's live album called Live 2003.

As they have for their other songs, Coldplay has refused to accept several offers to use "Trouble" for promotional tools. In 2004, the band rejected a multi-million Euro offer from Diet Coke and Gap to use the song and "Don't Panic", the fourth single from the album. They asked manager Phil Harvey to not refer such offers to them because "a discussion might lead to compromise". American actor Sylvester Stallone was interested to use the song for the soundtrack of his 2001 film Driven, but the band declined. The song was used in the season 1 finale of the FX television series The Shield.

== Reception ==
"Trouble" reached number 10 on the UK Singles Chart, making it the band's second top 10 single in the United Kingdom after "Yellow". The performance of "Trouble" has been attributed to the "colossal home sales" of Parachutes in the United Kingdom.

The positive reception of the single continued when the British outfit Lost Witness made a remixed version of the song, which was released and became "an unlikely dance floor anthem". With three singles successfully released, the band decided to abandon their initial plans of issuing "Don't Panic" as the fourth single of the album, deemed enough for a single album in the United Kingdom. "Don't Panic", however, was eventually released in some European regions. PopMatters listed the song's music video among the best of the year.

In the United States, chart performance was nearly as successful as that of "Yellow". It reached number 23 on the Billboard Adult Top 40 and number 28 on the Billboard Modern Rock Tracks. Martin claimed that the single saved them from being a one-hit wonder band. In 2003, Q had the track featured on their 1001 Best Songs Ever special. In 2010, it was part of The Xfm Top 1000 Songs of All Time book. Two years later, NPO Radio 2 ranked the song at number 297 on the annual Top 2000.

== Music videos ==
The original European version of the music video for "Trouble" was directed by British director Sophie Muller. It features Martin as a prisoner in a dark warehouse, tied with ropes to a chair, being circled by cars in the freezing cold. The other members of the band are seen on the upper floor in a slow motion sequence where Buckland and Champion struggle with bass guitarist Guy Berryman, tying him to another chair and forcing him to look in front. At this point, Martin's struggling causes his chair to tip over, and he hits the ground on his side. He sings the final line of the song ("They spun a web for me..."), before the darkness abruptly turns to daylight. A sunrise is then revealed, but as the camera pans out, it is revealed to be fake and part of a large theatre backdrop, with Martin still lying on his side, tied to the chair.

A US version of the music video was directed by Tim Hope. The video follows the motif of "Don't Panic" by showing the band as two-dimensional cut-outs. The band are aboard a horse carriage that cruises along a forest. On top of a mountain, a woman (Nerys Davies) waters plants inside a house. A little crow flies from the carriage up to the house, where it transforms into a more menacing bird. It flies over the house and turns into a black cloud, which pours rain onto the land. The rain burns little holes on the things it falls into, and crow feathers protrude from the holes. Finally a tornado lifts the house up from its foundations, spinning it across the sky and then dropping it precisely on a normal suburban street. The video's acclaimed visuals earned Hope an MTV Video Music Award for Best Art Direction in 2002. It was also nominated for Breakthrough Video.

== Covers ==
UK Funky artist Cooly G covered "Trouble" for her debut full-length album Playin' Me (2012).

== Track listing ==
CD Single
No.	Title	Length
1.	"Trouble"	4:33
2.	"Brothers and Sisters"	4:49
3.	"Shiver" (Jo Whiley Lunchtime Social)	4:21

Australian CD Single
No.	Title	Length
1.	"Trouble"	4:32
2.	"Don't Panic"	2:19
3.	"Brothers and Sisters"	4:48
4.	"Shiver" (Jo Whiley Lunchtime Social)	4:26

Trouble – Norwegian Live EP
No.	Title	Length
1.	"Trouble" (live at Rockefeller Music Hall)	4:35
2.	"Shiver" (live at Rockefeller Music Hall)	5:44
3.	"Sparks" (live at Rockefeller Music Hall)	3:54
4.	"Yellow" (live at Rockefeller Music Hall)	5:02
5.	"Everything's Not Lost" (live at Rockefeller Music Hall)	6:03

== Personnel ==
- Chris Martin – vocals, piano
- Jonny Buckland – guitar
- Guy Berryman – bass guitar
- Will Champion – drums, percussion

== Charts ==
=== Weekly charts ===
Weekly chart performance
Chart (2000–2017)	Peak position
Europe (Eurochart Hot 100)	43
France (SNEP)	60
Iceland (Íslenski Listinn Topp 40)	1
Ireland (IRMA)	16
Italy (FIMI)	16
Netherlands (Dutch Top 40)	38
Netherlands (Single Top 100)	67
New Zealand (Recorded Music NZ)	36
Norway (VG-lista) Trouble – Norwegian Live EP	3
Scottish Singles Sales (Official Charts)	10
South Korea International (Gaon)	71
Switzerland (Schweizer Hitparade)	76
UK Singles (Official Charts)	10
UK Rock & Metal (Official Charts)	1
US Bubbling Under Hot 100 (Billboard)	15
US Adult Alternative Airplay (Billboard)	4
US Adult Pop Airplay (Billboard)	23
US Alternative Airplay (Billboard)	28

=== Year-end charts ===
Year-end chart performance
Chart (2001)	Position
US Adult Top 40 (Billboard)	79

Chart (2002)	Position
US Adult Top 40 (Billboard)	69
US Triple-A (Billboard)	19

== Certifications and sales ==
Certifications and sales
Region	Certification	Certified units/sales
Denmark (IFPI Danmark)	Gold	45,000^{‡}
France	—	14,369 (Note: French decade-end sales for "Trouble" in the 2000s.)
Italy (FIMI) Sales since 2009	Gold	25,000^{‡}
New Zealand (RMNZ)	Platinum	30,000^{‡}
Norway (IFPI Norway) Trouble – Norwegian Live EP	Platinum	50,000^{*}
Spain (Promusicae)	Gold	30,000^{‡}
United Kingdom (BPI)	Platinum	600,000^{‡}
^{*} Sales figures based on certification alone.^{‡} Sales+streaming figures based on certification alone.

== Release history ==
Release dates and formats
Region	Version	Date	Format(s)	Label(s)	Ref.
United Kingdom	Original	23 October 2000	CD; cassette	Parlophone	
Norway	Norwegian Live EP	21 February 2001	CD	EMI	
Australia	Original	23 July 2001	CD	Parlophone	
United States	Original	30 July 2001	Hot adult contemporary radio	Capitol	
United States	Original	31 July 2001	Alternative radio	Capitol	
United States	Original	1 October 2001	Triple A radio	Capitol	

== See also ==
- List of UK top-ten singles in 2000
