= Tim Hope =

Tim Hope is a British director, performer and animator best known for his pop videos for Coldplay, R.E.M., Bingo Players and Captain Ango Pango, and his short film The Wolfman. His pop video for the Coldplay song "Trouble" won him an MTV Video Music Award for Best Art Direction in 2002. Combining live action and animation, he has created a unique body of work.

== Biography ==
After completing a theology and philosophy degree, Tim Hope became a standup comedian, most notably as one half of the comedy techno band The Pod with comedian Julian Barratt. Although Hope continues to work in comedy it is his animation work that earned him most attention, beginning with his multi-prize-winning manic short The Wolfman (British Animation Awards 2000: Public Choice and Best Animation at the Cutting Edge).

Since then, Hope has directed videos for Coldplay, Bingo Players, R.E.M., 1 Giant Leap, Jimmy Eat World, King Biscuit Time, Johnny Rzeznik, Robbie Williams, Thrice, and Steve Mason. He has also directed TV commercials for Compare the Market, PlayStation, Comcast and Hewlett Packard. His short films include The Wolfman, Minema Cinema and The Savage Canvas. He is represented by Passion Pictures.

Along with Andrew Bone, Tim Hope is the writer, performer and producer of The Tired Parents currently available from Mumsnet.
