= The Blue Room (EP) =

1999 extended play by Coldplay

EP by Coldplay
- Released: 11 October 1999
- Studios: Sync City (London); Orinoco (London)
- Genres: Alternative rock; indie rock
- Length: 19:33
- Label: Parlophone
- Producers: Chris Allison; Nikki Rosetti; Coldplay

Coldplay chronology
Safety (1998)	The Blue Room (1999)	Parachutes (2000)

The Blue Room is the second extended play (EP) by British rock band Coldplay. It was released on 11 October 1999, becoming their first work after signing a record deal with Parlophone earlier that year.

== Background ==
The version of "Don't Panic" featured on this release and produced by Chris Allison is different from the one that appears on the band's later debut LP, Parachutes. The fourth track, "High Speed", also produced by Chris Allison made the cut for Parachutes and remained unchanged. The first track, "Bigger Stronger" and fifth track, "Such a Rush", are re-releases from the Safety EP, and are the same on both EPs.

"See You Soon" would later become a regular part of Coldplay's setlist during their A Rush of Blood to the Head Tour and it was featured in both the DVD and CD of Coldplay's Live 2003 album. "See You Soon" was performed live for the first time since 2003 in Bogotá, Colombia, during the A Head Full of Dreams Tour and has become a recurring song in the tour.

Only 5000 copies of the CD version were manufactured in the original pressing, along with a limited edition 12-inch vinyl release which was individually numbered on the front picture sleeve. The CD version was re-released with identical packaging in 2001, thereby making it more widely available. A 2x7-inch vinyl version was included with The Singles 1999–2006 box set in 2007.

The artwork for the album was taken from a National Geographic magazine issue in 1997.

== Reception ==
AllMusic's MacKenzie Wilson considered The Blue Room to be "well-crafted with lush harmonies", adding that "Martin's harking vocals reflect common dream pop melodies similar to Gene frontman Martin Rossiter". Radio X cited it among the best extended plays of all time. Q ranked "Bigger Stronger" at number 77 on their "500 Greatest Lost Tracks" list.

== Track listing ==
All tracks are written by Coldplay, with co-production from Chris Allison and Nikki Rosetti.

The Blue Room track listing
No.	Title	Length
1.	"Bigger Stronger"	4:49
2.	"Don't Panic"	2:38
3.	"See You Soon"	2:51
4.	"High Speed"	4:16
5.	"Such a Rush"	4:57
Total length:		19:33

== Charts ==
Weekly chart performance
Chart (2000)	Peak position
UK Rock & Metal Albums Chart (Official Charts)	34
