= Brothers & Sisters (song) =

Single by Coldplay
- B-side: "Easy to Please"; "Only Superstition"
- Released: 26 April 1999
- Recorded: February 1999
- Studio: Station (London)
- Genre: Alternative rock
- Length: 4:05
- Label: Fierce Panda
- Songwriters: Guy Berryman; Jonny Buckland; Will Champion; Chris Martin
- Producers: Crash; Coldplay

Coldplay singles chronology
"Brothers & Sisters" (1999)	"Shiver" (2000)

Audio video
- "Brothers & Sisters" on YouTube

"Brothers & Sisters" is the debut single by British rock band Coldplay. It was released by Fierce Panda on 26 April 1999, following the extended play Safety (1998). The single peaked at number 92 on the UK Singles Chart and 1,500 copies of its vinyl edition were issued in a special wrap-around picture sleeve. It was re-released as an extended play by Brash in 2002.

== Background ==
Following the band's performance at the Camden Falcon in December 1998, Fierce Panda founder Simon Williams was the first journalist to write about Coldplay and offered the band to release their debut single in his label through a short record deal.

== Recording and versions ==
According to the single's liner notes, recording was completed in only four days and cost the band £400. The atmospheric sounds on the B-side track "Easy to Please" were created by setting up microphones on a wet road outside the studio.

There are three studio versions of the song, under three different titles. The first one, "Brothers + Sisters", can be found on the "Ode to Deodorant" promo cassette from 1998. The second, "Brothers & Sisters", is this release from 1999. The third version, "Brothers and Sisters", appeared as a B-Side of the single "Trouble", from the band's debut album Parachutes, both released in 2000.

== Track listing ==
No.	Title	Length
1.	"Brothers & Sisters"	4:05
2.	"Easy to Please"	3:01
3.	"Only Superstition"	3:50

== Personnel ==
Coldplay

- Chris Martin – vocals, acoustic guitar, piano
- Jonny Buckland – lead guitar
- Guy Berryman – bass guitar
- Will Champion – drums

Additional personnel

- Crash – producer
- Mike Beever – engineer, mixer
- John Hilton – photographer, artwork

== Charts ==
Weekly chart performance
Chart (1999)	Peak position
UK Indie (Official Charts)	20
UK Singles (Official Charts)	92

== Release history ==
Release dates and formats
Region	Date	Format	Version	Label	Ref.
United Kingdom	26 April 1999	CD	Standard	Fierce Panda	
United States	28 October 2003	CD	Standard	Sixthman	
United States	18 November 2003	CD	Standard	Brash Music	
Various	26 April 2019	7-inch	Standard	Fierce Panda	
Various	15 November 2024	7-inch	Standard	Fierce Panda	
