= Safety (EP) =

1998 extended play by Coldplay

EP by Coldplay
- Released: 25 May 1998
- Recorded: 1–2 February 1998
- Studio: Sync City (London)
- Genres: Alternative rock; power pop
- Length: 14:24
- Label: Self-released
- Producers: Coldplay; Nikki Rosetti

Coldplay chronology
Safety (1998)	The Blue Room (1999)

Safety is the debut extended play (EP) and public release by British rock band Coldplay. It was recorded at Tottenham's Sync City Studios with Nikki Rosetti between 1 and 2 February 1998, following their live debut at the Laurel Tree in London. Phil Harvey funded the project for £1,500 and received a box with 500 copies on 19 May 1998. Most of them were given away to record label executives, friends and family, but around 150 were sold on the open market. According to Harvey, it was his father and an Oxford roommate that helped him finance Safety. The latter originally bought a copy of it for around £3.

== Packaging ==
The artwork is a photograph of lead singer Chris Martin taken by John Hilton, a friend of the band. His long exposure shot captured Martin's moving head perfectly framed by a safety door sign at one of the band's gigs and inspired the extended play's title.

== Distribution ==
On 25 May 1998, Coldplay managed to sell 50 units of the extended play to their public at Dingwalls. All three of the songs appeared unaltered on subsequent releases: "Bigger Stronger" and "Such a Rush" were featured on The Blue Room, while "No More Keeping My Feet on the Ground" became a B-side for their breakthrough hit "Yellow". According to UNILAD, copies of the extended play can now go up to $2,500 on marketplaces across the internet.

== Track listing ==
All tracks are written by Coldplay, with co-production from Nikki Rosetti.

Safety track listing
No.	Title	Length
1.	"Bigger Stronger"	4:49
2.	"No More Keeping My Feet on the Ground"	4:31
3.	"Such a Rush"	4:57
Total length:		14:24

== Personnel ==
Coldplay

- Chris Martin – vocals, keyboards, acoustic guitar, songwriting, production
- Jonny Buckland – electric guitar, songwriting, production
- Guy Berryman – bass guitar, songwriting, production
- Will Champion – drums, songwriting, production

Technical personnel

- Nikki Rosetti – production, engineering
- Phil Harvey – management
- John Hilton – photography
- Kut & Payste Studios – sleeve design
