= Shiver (Coldplay song) =

2000 single by Coldplay

Single by Coldplay

from the album Parachutes
- B-side: "For You"; "Careful Where You Stand"
- Released: 6 March 2000
- Recorded: November 1999 – May 2000
- Studio: Rockfield (Rockfield)
- Genre: Alternative rock; indie rock
- Length: 5:02
- Label: Parlophone; Nettwerk
- Songwriters: Guy Berryman; Jonny Buckland; Will Champion; Chris Martin
- Producers: Ken Nelson; Coldplay

Coldplay singles chronology
"Brothers & Sisters" (1999)	"Shiver" (2000)	"Yellow" (2000)

Music video
- "Shiver" on YouTube

"Shiver" is a song by British rock band Coldplay which appeared on the band's debut album Parachutes (2000), and was released as the album's lead single in the United Kingdom and second single in the United States following "Yellow". As a single it reached number 35 on the UK Singles Chart, number 26 on the US Modern Rock Tracks chart, and 57 on the Australian ARIA Singles Chart. Its critical reception has been generally positive.

The song's lyrics are a reference to an unrequited love of lyricist Chris Martin. There was media speculation regarding which "specific" woman is the focus in the lyrics - Martin has denied it was about Australian singer-songwriter Natalie Imbruglia. The song contains influences attributed to American singer-songwriter Jeff Buckley, who was an early influence on Coldplay. British record producer Ken Nelson and Coldplay produced the track.

The single also features two B-sides, "For You" and "Careful Where You Stand". Both B-sides are featured as the only bonus tracks on the Japanese edition of Parachutes.

== Production and composition ==
"Shiver" was written two years before its release. Martin allegedly wrote the song about Australian singer-songwriter Natalie Imbruglia, a woman he was romantically linked with at the time, but he later denied it was about her. Other accounts have claimed that Imbruglia was not the inspiration for the lyrics. Instead, Martin appeared to have been inspired by girlfriends in his teenage years and early 20s. Martin wrote the song on a "glum" day, when he felt he would never find the right woman for him. He described it as something of a "stalking song", admitting he wrote it for a specific woman. In addition, Martin wrote the song while listening to music of Buckley, and had claimed it is their "most blatant rip-off song".

"Shiver" was recorded in Rockfield Studios in Wales, United Kingdom, where the band was booked by A&R representative Dan Keeling to begin working on the band's debut album, Parachutes. Keeling was disappointed with the early demos presented to him, saying it "didn't have any of their passion, their energy", a result of the band's freshly resolved internal pressure in the time. Keeling deemed the demos as "limp" and asked the band to redo it. Smaller parts of the song were recorded at Parr Street Studios in Liverpool, England, where the band relocated after Christmas in 1999.

The song was produced by Coldplay and British record producer Ken Nelson. As with most songs in the album, Nelson used an analogue desk in recording "Shiver". The guitar was re-dubbed in search of perfection, while Martin de-tuned his guitar to easily generate complex chord sequences. Martin's vocals were recorded in more than one take, but the band chose the one with a single take.

"Shiver" is in the alternative rock genre. A review claims that Coldplay's indie rock inclinations are obvious in the song. "Shiver" has been perceived to have influences of Buckley, whom Coldplay's early song influences were drawn from. Martin later said of the song that it was "a blatant Jeff Buckley attempt, not quite as good, that's what I think".

The song is written in B major with a tempo of 78 beats per minute.

== Release ==
"Shiver" is one of the older songs in Coldplay's catalogue, and had been performed at their early concerts in 1999. Later, it was initially released as an EP in the spring of 2000. It was released as the album's lead single in the United Kingdom on 6 March 2000, months before the release of the album. The single had been picked up for B-play lists on some European prominent radio stations. In the United States, the song was released as the second single, following "Yellow", on 9 April 2001.

== Critical reception ==
=== Reviews ===
"Shiver" was met with praise from music critics. Adrian Denning wrote that the song "has a vocal that could be Jeff Buckley influenced, the soaring vocals are a joy over a reasonably guitar rock-based instrumental track". Hybrid's David DeVoe said "'Shiver' is a delightfully laid back tune, full of that great guitar sound that I have come to appreciate this band for". Spencer Owen of Pitchfork noted "It's the only truly decent song on Parachutes, but simultaneously, it's the only one that blatantly shows its influences".

=== Rankings ===
List of critic rankings
Publication	Year	Description	Result	Ref.
NME	2016	Best Tracks of 2000	43	
Radio X	2010	The Xfm Top 1000 Songs of All Time	Placed	
Radio X	2026	Best of British 500	356	
Spin	2020	The 50 Best Songs of the Year 2000	24	

== Music video ==
The music video for "Shiver" was directed by English film director and cinematographer Grant Gee. It features Coldplay performing in a small studio. The yellow globe featured on the Parachutes cover can be seen on top of an amplifier in the video. The music video received "strong exposure" on MTV. "Shiver" was featured on Coldplay's Live 2003.

== Track listing ==
UK CD single
No.	Title	Length
1.	"Shiver"	5:02
2.	"For You"	5:45
3.	"Careful Where You Stand"	4:47

== Personnel ==
- Chris Martin – vocals, acoustic guitar
- Jonny Buckland – lead guitar
- Guy Berryman – bass guitar
- Will Champion – drums

== Charts ==
Weekly chart performance
Chart (2000–2001)	Peak position
Australia (ARIA)	57
Netherlands (Single Top 100)	100
Scottish Singles Sales (Official Charts)	45
UK Singles (Official Charts)	35
US Alternative Airplay (Billboard)	26

== Certifications ==
Certifications
Region	Certification	Certified units/sales
New Zealand (RMNZ)	Gold	15,000^{‡}
United Kingdom (BPI)	Silver	200,000^{‡}
^{‡} Sales+streaming figures based on certification alone.
