= Phil Harvey (music manager) =

English band manager (born 1976)

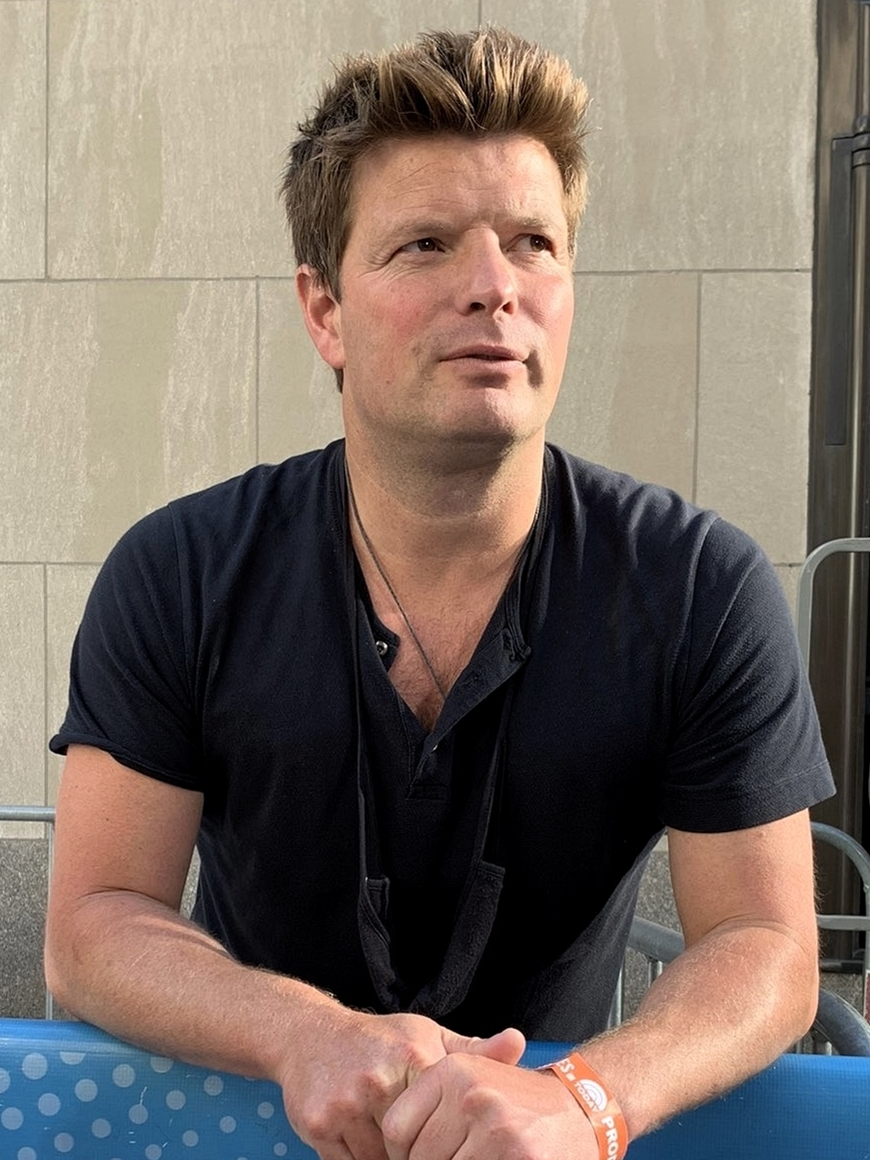
- Harvey at The Today Show in 2021
- Born: Philip Christopher Harvey; 29 August 1976 (age 50); Bristol, England
- Education: University of Melbourne
- Occupations: Music manager; creative director
- Years active: 1998–2002; 2006–present
- Spouse: Yasmin Harvey
- Awards: Full list
- Musical career
- Origin: London, England
- Labels: Fierce Panda; Parlophone; Nettwerk; Capitol; Atlantic
- Member of: Coldplay

Philip Christopher Harvey (born 29 August 1976) is an English music manager and creative director. He contributes exclusively to the rock band Coldplay, who consider him their fifth member. After studying at Sherborne School and befriending Chris Martin, he continued his education at Trinity College, Oxford, pursuing a degree in Greek and Latin. Harvey organised student parties at the time, leading him to finance the group, manage their career and eventually drop out of his course.

They signed with Parlophone in 1999, finding global fame after the release of Parachutes (2000) and subsequent albums. However, the stress of managing Coldplay alone caused Harvey to step down from his role in 2002, returning only four years later. During this interval, he studied psychology at University of Melbourne. He won a Grammy Award and became a Billboard UK Power Player for working with Coldplay. Having sold over 170 million records worldwide, they are the most successful band of the 21st century.

== Early life ==
Philip Christopher Harvey was born on 29 August 1976 in Bristol, England. He attended Sherborne School from 1990 to 1995, in the Lyon House. He also played bass for the Rockin' Honkies, a group inspired by Motown and Otis Redding tracks. His position later changed to sound engineer. It was at Sherborne that Harvey met Chris Martin. The singer received an invitation to take on keyboard duties for the band. After secondary education, both of them pursued degrees in Greek and Latin. Harvey enrolled at Trinity College, Oxford, while Martin opted for University College London and later formed Coldplay.

== Career ==
=== Management ===
While studying in Oxford, Harvey worked at local nightclubs setting up and promoting student parties. Despite considering those activities to be basic, he has stated that these gigs helped him to understand how to hire a venue, book a musician or DJ, and try to make money. In 1998, Martin complained that one of the local promoters in Camden was spiteful towards Coldplay, to which Harvey suggested the band should organise a performance on their own at Dingwalls. Around 400 people attended the concert and they sold the first 50 copies of Safety throughout the set. The earnings helped Harvey to pay back his father and a roommate, as they financed the extended play. It was around this period that he dropped out of college to dedicate himself to management, which encompassed calling A&R professionals, reading Music Week and scheduling more shows.

One of the performances arranged by Harvey was for In the City, a festival of unsigned bands in Manchester. Two days later, scout Debs Wild reached out to him, linking Coldplay to the music industry through her connections with Caroline Elleray from BMG Publishing and lawyer Gavin Maude. In 1999, the group wrote "Brothers & Sisters" and recorded it under a short-term contract with Fierce Panda. However, when the song was released, they already had signed with Parlophone. Harvey later got overwhelmed by the success of Parachutes (2000), as the record topped the UK Albums Chart and caused him to work for 16 hours a day: "It was only later that I discovered most international bands have huge teams and organisations supporting them not just one bloke in a shithole".

Despite Estelle Wilkinson being hired as his assistant to help, he declared that the 2001 Brit Awards was his lowest point, since Coldplay had won British Group and British Album of the Year, but he was feeling exhausted. Harvey announced his departure during the last recording session for A Rush of Blood to the Head (2002), a situation he described as dramatic due to his friendship with Martin and the fact he was moving to another continent. His role was jointly taken over by Wilkinson and Dave Holmes, who managed Coldplay in the United States. By the end of the Twisted Logic Tour (2005–2007), Holmes had assumed duties alone. He worked for the group until 2022, suing them over a contractual dispute in the following year. As a result, Harvey became their manager again, but with assistance from Mandi Frost and Arlene Moon.

=== Creative direction ===
Well the band encourage me to say that I'm the Creative Director, which I fucking hate. It makes me sound like I run a ballet company or a marketing agency. I don't know... in the album liner notes they always list me as a band member, which is very sweet.

— Harvey, 2018

Following his years away from the United Kingdom, Harvey went back to London and started to hang out with Martin again. He visited the studio occasionally to give his opinion on what the band were doing, something which became a permanent role by 2006. Two years later, Coldplay published an appeal to Wikipedia via their website to stress Harvey's participation in the line-up, concluding they were actually a quintet. He was included as a member in the liner notes of all albums except Parachutes (2000) and X&Y (2005). (Note: Harvey is credited for management on Parachutes (2000) and "wise words" on X&Y (2005).) As per Jonny Buckland, things are easier when Harvey is around because his presence gives a sense of security to his bandmates.

He was encouraged to describe himself as their creative director, but showed disdain towards it: "I'm not particularly creative, but I guess I do try to give them some direction from time to time". Moreover, Harvey affirmed that his role includes helping with videos, designing live performances, visiting the studio regularly, writing press releases and handling any other possible situations if necessary. He has appeared as an easter egg in several music videos released by Coldplay, and is known for his interactions with fans of the band on social media. Some conversations led to albums and songs becoming more widely available on streaming services, including the track "Flags", from Everyday Life (2019).

== Personal life ==
According to South China Morning Post, Harvey has an estimated wealth of £40 million as of July 2024. He purchased a house in Brentwood, Los Angeles, for about $15 million in January 2019, moving there with his wife Yasmin. Before rejoining Coldplay, he travelled around South America; learned psychotherapy and counseling at Regent's College; and enrolled at University of Melbourne, completing a psychology degree. His next project was volunteering at Upbeat, which offered resources to musicians facing mental health issues. Harvey is a ClientEarth trustee as well. In 2007, he visited Leeds Metropolitan University to speak with talent management students.

== Accolades ==
- 2004 – Record of the Year winner at the 46th Annual Grammy Awards (with "Clocks").
- 2004 – Best Short Form Music Video nominee at the 46th Annual Grammy Awards (with "The Scientist").
- 2017 – Best Pop Vocal Album nominee at the 60th Annual Grammy Awards (with Kaleidoscope EP).
- 2025 – Billboard UK Power Players winner (under "Management").
- 2026 – Billboard UK Power Players winner (under "Management").

== Discography ==
- Parachutes (2000)
- A Rush of Blood to the Head (2002)
- X&Y (2005)
- Viva la Vida or Death and All His Friends (2008)
- Mylo Xyloto (2011)
- Ghost Stories (2014)
- A Head Full of Dreams (2015)
- Everyday Life (2019)
- Music of the Spheres (2021)
- Moon Music (2024)
