= Will Champion =

English drummer (born 1978)

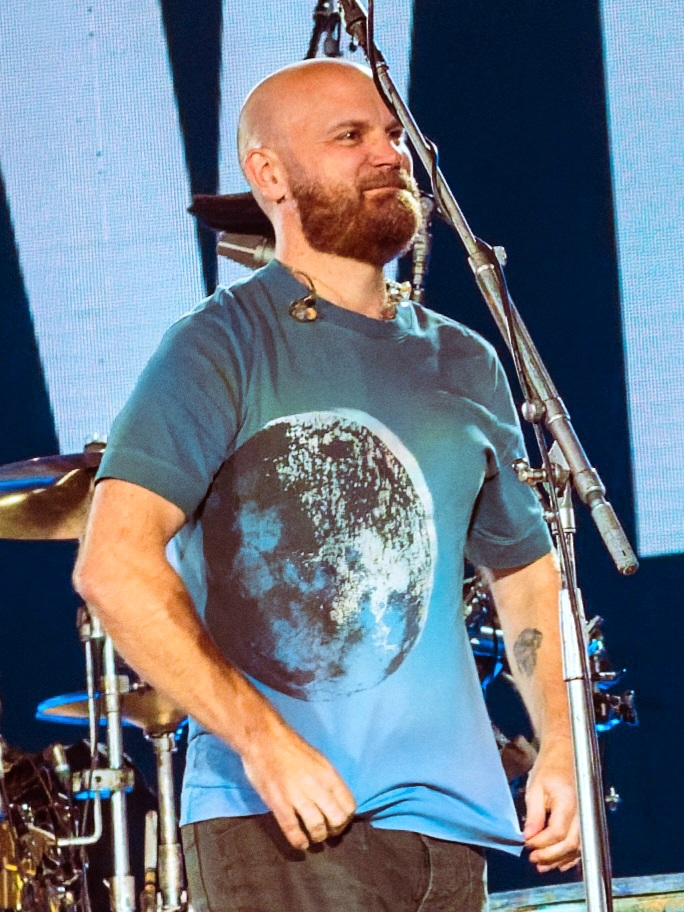
- Champion at Wembley Stadium in 2025
- Born: William Champion; 31 July 1978 (age 48); Southampton, Hampshire, England
- Education: University College London
- Occupations: Musician; songwriter
- Years active: 1998–present
- Spouse: Marianna Dark (m. 2003)
- Children: 3
- Mother: Sara Champion
- Awards: Full list
- Musical career
- Origin: London, England
- Genres: Alternative rock; pop rock; post-Britpop; pop
- Instruments: Drums; percussion; vocals; piano; keyboards; guitar
- Labels: Fierce Panda; Parlophone; Nettwerk; Capitol; Atlantic
- Member of: Coldplay

William Champion (born 31 July 1978) is an English musician and songwriter. He is best known as the drummer and percussionist of the rock band Coldplay. Raised in Southampton, he learned to play numerous instruments during his youth, being influenced by Nick Cave, Bob Dylan, Tom Waits and traditional Irish folk music. His energetic drumming style is largely focused on the essential elements of the songs and he occasionally takes lead vocal duties on live performances.

Champion has a 2:1 degree in anthropology from University College London, where he completed Coldplay's line-up with Chris Martin, Jonny Buckland and Guy Berryman. The band signed with Parlophone in 1999 and found global success with Parachutes (2000) and subsequent albums. He has won seven Grammy Awards, nine Brit Awards and an honorary degree as Doctor of Music for contributing to Coldplay. Having sold over 170 million records worldwide, they are the most successful group of the 21st century.

== Early life ==
William Champion was born on 31 July 1978 in Southampton, Hampshire, England, being the second child of archaeology lecturers Timothy and Sara Champion. He was raised in the Highfield suburb of the town, close to the University of Southampton, where his parents worked. His studies began at Portswood Primary School, later continuing at Cantell School and Peter Symonds College. He used to play cricket for Chandler's Ford CC alongside his older brother and they went to the Highfield Church regularly. After being asked about his upbringing, he said that music was "constantly on the stereo at home", which included "anything from Bob Dylan, Tom Waits and Nick Cave to traditional Irish folk". He also took part in a group called Fat Hamster.

His upbringing influenced him to start lessons on multiple instruments, including piano and violin from the age of eight, guitar at 12, and eventually bass and tin whistle. However, Champion did not always enjoy the classes, since he could not read music and played the songs from memory: "I watched my teacher's hand on the piano, memorized it, and ended up doing it myself". Despite being chosen to be the drummer at school and using a neighbour's kit, he was not keen on the instrument either. He attended work experience at Nuffield Theatre's box office and backstage when he was 14 years old.

Champion's education continued in University College London, where he attained a 2:1 degree in anthropology and met Chris Martin, Jonny Buckland and Guy Berryman, eventually forming Coldplay. He worked as a doorman at a bar run by Ricky Gervais while studying. Years later, he said that his experience in other instruments helped with coordination and offered a different perspective on drumming, being an important part of his style: "Knowing the difference between the major and minor key is very important too, and I was lucky to learn all that before I was playing drums. That has more to do with the feel of a song [and what's right for it] instead of knowing how to play powerfully for a second".

== Career ==
=== Coldplay ===
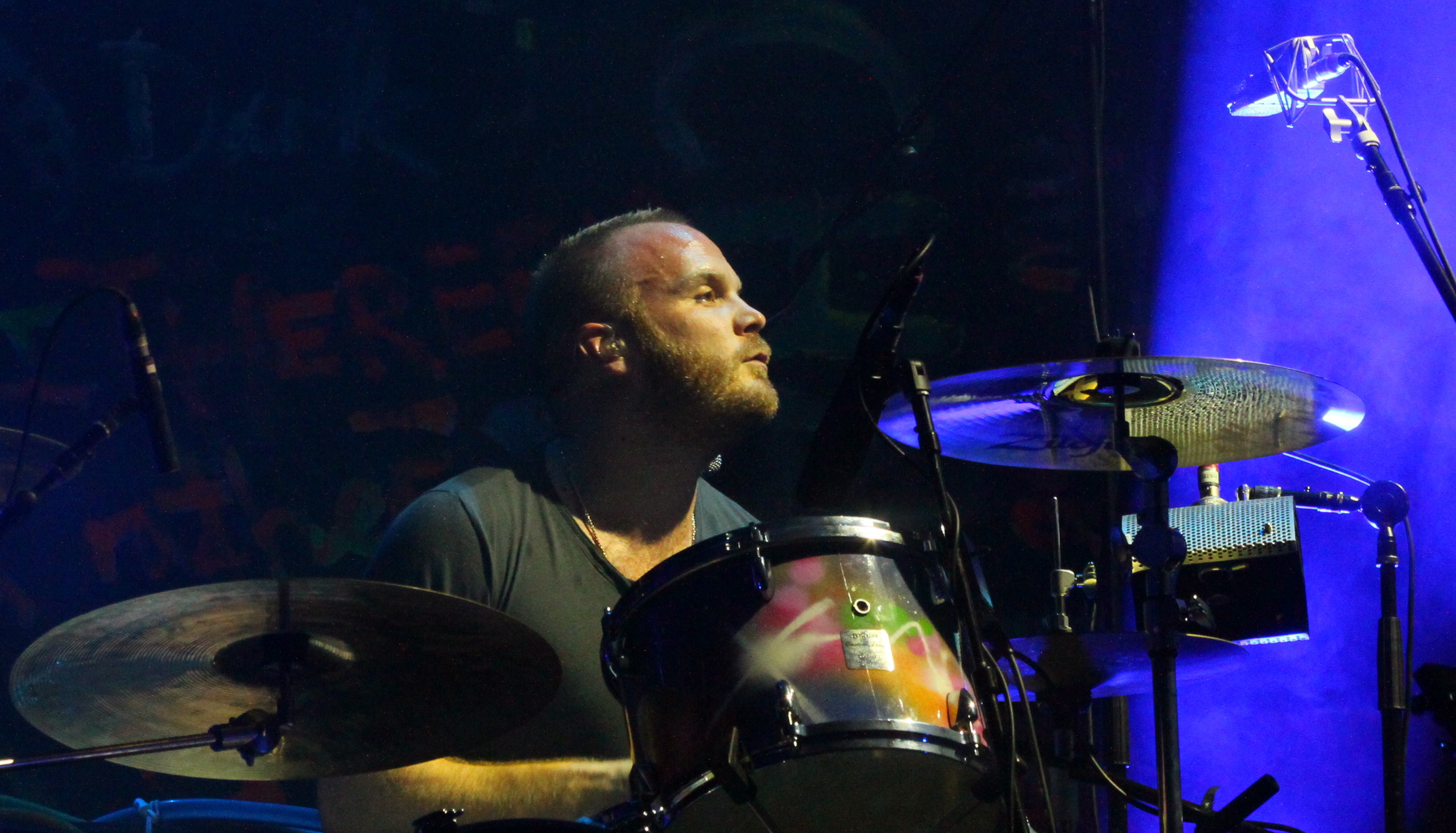
Champion playing the drums at Fuji Rock Festival in July 2011

Champion was the last performing member to join the band in 1998. (Note: Overall, the fifth and final member was music manager and creative director Phil Harvey.) He explained that Martin, Buckland and Berryman came to his house because a roommate had a drum kit and was a good drummer, but he had not turned up, "so I just said I'd give it a go". They recorded the session and he was later invited to the ensemble despite not having significant prior experience. In 1999, he was temporarily sacked from the group by Martin due to heated discussions regarding his abilities as a drummer: "Three days later, the rest of us were feeling miserable [...] we asked him to come back. They made me have lots of vodka and cranberry juice in remembrance of what a nasty piece of work I was being". The incident became an inspiration for "Trouble", which was written as an apology to him.

In Coldplay, Champion is often regarded as the rationality of the band, with Martin saying "When I think of him, I think of something heavy and granite-like. Like the base of a statue. Without that, the thing topples". While answering questions from fans, other members added that he "does have a very sensible head on his shoulders and when it comes to making decisions he is really good at putting valid points across and keeping everyone focused. He frequently has the casting vote and his decision can sometimes override the consensus". They often praise his multi-instrumentalism as well, calling him a "human jukebox". Although Buckland and Berryman have contributed to backing vocals, Champion remained the most prominent in the role, as seen throughout Viva la Vida Tour (2008–2010), when he played "Death Will Never Conquer". His rendition of the song was included on LeftRightLeftRightLeft (2009). Lead vocals are also present on "The Goldrush", "In My Place" (Live in Buenos Aires), and "Angelsong". The latter is heard on Moon Music (2024) both separately and within "Alien Hits / Alien Radio".

=== Other projects ===
Champion guested on a-ha keyboardist Magne Furuholmen's debut album, Past Perfect Future Tense (2004), along with Berryman. In 2011, the drummer was part of a video for the Beat for Peace campaign, which "called on global leaders to take urgent diplomatic action" and "prevent all out conflict returning to Sudan". He also made a guest appearance as one of the Red Wedding musicians in the "Rains of Castamere" episode from Game of Thrones, which aired on 2 June 2013. In the following year, he contributed to Brian Eno and Karl Hyde's collaborative album, Someday World (2014). Champion is known to support food and wine magazine Noble Rot as well, becoming an investor in their namesake restaurants. In 2017, he visited the University of Southampton to talk with music students about composing, studio recording, live performances and managing stardom. Along with Buckland, the drummer assisted Jodie Whittaker in her cover of "Yellow" for BBC's Children in Need album in 2019. Moreover, he has guested on DrumathonLIVE, a charity event focused on raising money for children's mental health. In 2023, he received an honorary degree as Doctor of Music from the University of Southampton.

== Musical style ==
=== Equipment ===
Champion's first drum kit was a Yamaha 9000. The company has supplied many custom maple sets for him over the years. Since the Head Full of Dreams Tour (2016–2017), his equipment includes a 22"x16" bass drum, a 13"x9" rack tom, a 16"x15" floor tom, various snare drums, and Zildjian cymbals (20" K Heavy ride; 18" A Custom Medium crashes; and 14" K Custom Dark hi-hats). Most performances are fulfilled using Remo's Ambassador Coated drumheads, Pro-Mark's 5A hickory wood drumsticks, and a Roc-N-Soc drum throne. He also owns three electronic pads and a cajón. Known for an energetic drumming style, Champion once stated he lacked the confidence to play loud or heavy at first, something which became part of his sound: "That's my trademark—wait" and "steal the limelight at the end".

=== Influences ===
When questioned about which Coldplay songs he thinks are his technical or feel-wise best, Champion observed that he was proud of the ones where everything was cut down to the essentials and mentioned "Viva la Vida" as an example: "It's just a kick drum, a bell and a little bit of timpani here and there, but it's so simple. We tried so many different things with that, four-beats, rock beats, everything—but nothing worked [...] There are so many intricacies on the violins, the melodies and everything, I just felt [it has] to be simple with no frills, just support the song". His favourite album is Rum Sodomy & the Lash (1985) by the Pogues. In 2006, he listened to Klaxons, Arcade Fire and hip-hop artists. The drummer endorsed works from Fontaines D.C. and Grian Chatten in 2024 as well. His top players include Ginger Baker, John Bonham and Dave Grohl.

== Personal life ==
According to The Times, Champion has an estimated wealth of £113 million as of May 2022. He is a longtime supporter of Southampton F.C. and has owned a season ticket for many years. His parents used to DJ as Champion Tunes at local pubs before Sara died from cancer in 2000. Her funeral ended up scheduled on the same day Coldplay had to film the music video for "Yellow", hence why Martin appears alone. Their debut album references her in the liner notes. In 2003, he married teacher Marianna Dark, becoming the first band member to wed. They have three children and live in London's Hampstead area.

Interviewed by The Guardian, Champion said that he loves being able to "disappear" back to his children (who are studying Suzuki method violin) and wife (who sings in Brian Eno's private choir) after playing stadiums worldwide. This "skill" was a theme of a sketch by British comedian Nish Kumar in Live at the Apollo. The drummer also commented that he often dances with Dark at their house. She recorded backing vocals on the title track of Everyday Life (2019), becoming his favourite piece of sound from the album. Champion declared that his favourite activity outside music is cooking. He made drawings for each Music of the Spheres World Tour (2022–2025) stop on his drums.

== Discography ==
=== With Coldplay ===
- Parachutes (2000)
- A Rush of Blood to the Head (2002)
- X&Y (2005)
- Viva la Vida or Death and All His Friends (2008)
- Mylo Xyloto (2011)
- Ghost Stories (2014)
- A Head Full of Dreams (2015)
- Everyday Life (2019)
- Music of the Spheres (2021)
- Moon Music (2024)

=== Solo credits ===
- Past Perfect Future Tense (2004) – drummer
- Someday World (2014) – drummer

== See also ==
- List of people associated with University College London
- List of British Grammy winners and nominees
- List of best-selling music artists
- List of highest-grossing live music artists
- List of artists who reached number one on the UK Singles Chart
