= Miracles (Someone Special) =

Promotional single by Coldplay and Big Sean

from the EP Kaleidoscope
- Released: 14 July 2017
- Genre: Dance-pop
- Length: 4:36
- Label: Parlophone; Atlantic
- Songwriters: Guy Berryman; Jonny Buckland; Will Champion; Chris Martin; Sean Anderson
- Producers: Rik Simpson; Daniel Green; Bill Rahko; Martin Terefe

"Miracles (Someone Special)" is a song by British rock band Coldplay and American rapper Big Sean. It was released on 14 July 2017 as part of the Kaleidoscope EP, a companion piece to their seventh studio album, A Head Full of Dreams (2015). It was the first time the band featured a rapper in one of their tracks since Jay-Z's "Lost+". The song is noted for using sampling a line by Michael J. Fox from Back to the Future (1985). It was also ranked among the best of its year by 3voor12, and Panorama.

== Background ==
The track was served to contemporary hit radio in Italy as a promotional single upon release. An official lyric video, directed by Ben Mor, was made available in the following day. It switches between several photographs, most of them concerning immigrants reaching Ellis Island, between the end of the 19th century and the beginning of the 20th.

== Personnel ==
- Chris Martin – lead vocals, acoustic guitar
- Jonny Buckland – guitar
- Guy Berryman – bass guitar
- Will Champion – backing vocals, electronic drums
- Big Sean – rap vocals

== Charts ==
=== Weekly charts ===
Weekly chart performance
| Chart (2017) | Peak position |
|---|---|
| Argentina Anglo (Monitor Latino) | 15 |
| Belgium (Ultratop 50 Flanders) | 26 |
| Belgium (Ultratop 50 Wallonia) | 29 |
| Canada AC (Billboard) | 42 |
| Czech Republic (Singles Digitál Top 100) | 80 |
| Denmark Airplay (Tracklisten) | 18 |
| France (SNEP) | 72 |
| Hungary (Rádiós Top 40) | 31 |
| Ireland (IRMA) | 98 |
| Italy (FIMI) | 76 |
| Italy Airplay (EarOne) | 2 |
| Mexico Ingles Airplay (Billboard) | 11 |
| Netherlands (Dutch Top 40) | 30 |
| New Zealand Heatseekers (RMNZ) | 5 |
| Poland (Polish Airplay Top 100) | 30 |
| Portugal (AFP) | 81 |
| Scotland (OCC) | 22 |
| Slovakia (Rádio Top 100) | 44 |
| Sweden (Sverigetopplistan) | 62 |
| Switzerland (Schweizer Hitparade) | 45 |
| UK Singles (OCC) | 54 |

=== Year-end charts ===
Year-end chart performance
| Chart (2017) | Position |
|---|---|
| Hungary (Rádiós Top 40) | 93 |
| Iceland (Tónlistinn) | 49 |
| Italy Airplay (EarOne) | 15 |

== Certifications ==
Certifications
| Region | Certification | Certified units/sales |
|---|---|---|
| Italy (FIMI) | Gold | 25,000^{‡} |
^{‡} Sales+streaming figures based on certification alone.

== Release history ==
Release dates and formats
| Region | Date | Format | Label | Ref. |
|---|---|---|---|---|
| Italy | 14 July 2017 | Contemporary hit radio | Warner | |
| United Kingdom | 21 July 2017 | Contemporary hit radio | Parlophone | |
