= Aliens (song) =

Promotional single by Coldplay

from the EP Kaleidoscope
- Released: 6 July 2017
- Length: 4:42
- Label: Parlophone; Atlantic
- Composers: Guy Berryman; Jonny Buckland; Will Champion; Chris Martin; Brian Eno
- Producers: Markus Dravs; Rik Simpson; Brian Eno

Music video
- "Aliens" on YouTube

"Aliens" is a song by the British rock band Coldplay. It was written by Coldplay and Brian Eno, and produced by Eno, Markus Dravs and Rik Simpson. The track was released on 6 July 2017 as a charity single and the third excerpt from Coldplay's thirteenth EP Kaleidoscope (2017) after "Hypnotised" and "All I Can Think About Is You". The proceeds from the song were donated to the international NGO Migrant Offshore Aid Station, which rescues migrants and refugees in peril at sea in the Mediterranean. On 21 July, a remix by Markus Dravs was released.

== Critical reception ==
Jeremy Gordon of Spin wrote: "The skittering percussion and swirling electronics that open up the song are completely dissimilar from the EDM components they picked up on the way to their regrettable successful Chainsmokers collaboration; the spooky tones permeating the spaces in between Martin's indefatigably earnest vocals sound like background music from an X-Files episode. The song is constantly in motion, as all the elements pulse and hum in the same direction. It's cluttered, but not distracting. Martin's lyrics, which address the refugee crisis, lean hard on the maudlin side, which is not an unfamiliar space for the band to be." Althea Legaspi of Rolling Stone wrote: "The song's pulsating rhythms emulate the racing heartbeat that might accompany searching for safety in a bleak world." Bianca Gracie of Fuse called the melody "blippy" and "space-age". Darragh Berry of Joe wrote that the song has "the distinctive Coldplay sound" and called the lyrics "deep" and "meaningful".

== Music video ==
The animated lyrics video was directed by Diane Martel and Ben Jones. It shows a family running from explosions on the ground and foreboding creatures in the sky, as they escape from a planet.

== Track listing ==
Digital download
No.	Title	Length
1.	"Aliens"	4:42

Digital download – remix
No.	Title	Length
1.	"Aliens" (Markus Dravs remix)	7:05

== Credits and personnel ==
Credits adapted from Tidal.

- Guy Berryman – composing, keyboard, bass guitar
- Will Champion – composing, keyboard, drums, programming
- Jonny Buckland – composing, electric guitar
- Chris Martin – composing, vocals, keyboard, acoustic guitar
- Brian Eno – composing, producing, background vocals, guitar
- Markus Dravs – producing
- Rik Simpson – producing, background vocals, mixing
- Chris Allgood – mastering engineering
- Emily Lazar – mastering engineering
- Daniel Green – co-producing, engineering, keyboard
- Anthony De Souza – engineering
- John Metcalfe – engineering, strings, viola, violin, recording
- Bill Rahko – engineering
- Laurence Anslow – assisting
- Aleks Von Korff – assisting
- Tom Bailey – assisting
- Owen Butcher – assisting
- Andrew Rugg – assistant engineering
- Robin Baynton – assistant engineering
- Davide Rossi – cello

== Charts ==
Weekly chart performance
Chart (2017)	Peak position
France (SNEP)	87
Netherlands (Dutch Single Tip Chart)	28
US Hot Rock & Alternative Songs (Billboard)	17
