= Kaleidoscope EP =

2017 EP by Coldplay

EP by Coldplay
- Released: 14 July 2017
- Genres: Rock; EDM
- Length: 24:57
- Labels: Parlophone; Atlantic
- Producers: Rik Simpson; Bill Rahko; Markus Dravs; Brian Eno; Daniel Green; Martin Terefe

Coldplay chronology
A Head Full of Dreams (2015)	Kaleidoscope EP (2017)	Global Citizen – EP 1 (2018)

Singles from Kaleidoscope
- 1. "Something Just Like This" Released: 22 February 2017

Kaleidoscope EP is the thirteenth EP by the British rock band Coldplay. It was released worldwide on 14 July 2017 and serves as a companion piece to the band's seventh studio album, A Head Full of Dreams (2015). The EP was nominated for the Grammy Award for Best Pop Vocal Album at the 60th Annual Grammy Awards.

== Background ==
On 21 November 2016, lead singer Chris Martin announced the EP title on the band's official Twitter account, it is the same as an interlude track from A Head Full of Dreams (2015). The release was originally due to 2 June, but it was delayed to 30 June and then 14 July without any previous announcement from the band.

== Singles ==
=== Commercial singles ===
The Chainsmokers and Coldplay collaborated on the lead single "Something Just Like This", which was made available on 22 February 2017. For the extended play, a new version titled "Tokyo Remix" was recorded live in Tokyo, Japan in April and released on 23 June.

=== Promotional singles ===
The band revealed "Hypnotised" and the track listing of the EP on 2 March 2017. "All I Can Think About Is You" came out on 15 June as the second offering, with an accompanying lyric video directed by I Saw John First. On 7 July, following Coldplay's performance at Global Citizen Festival Germany, they launched "Aliens" as a charity single, with all profits being donated to the Migrant Offshore Aid Station. The animated lyric video was directed by Diane Martel and Ben Jones. On 14 July, "Miracles (Someone Special)", featuring Big Sean, was sent to Italian radio stations as a promotional single. A visualiser debuted in the following day.

== Commercial performance ==
Kaleidoscope EP debuted at number 15 on the US Billboard 200, with 24,000 equivalent units. In Japan, it debuted at number 25 with 2,797 physical copies sold.

== Critical reception ==
Professional ratings
Aggregate scores
Source	Rating
Metacritic	63/100
Review scores
Source	Rating
AllMusic	3.5/5 stars
The Guardian	3/5 stars
NME	4/5 stars
Pitchfork	5.8/10
PopMatters	5/10 stars
Rolling Stone	3.5/5 stars

Upon release, Kaleidoscope EP received positive reaction from critics. At Metacritic, which assigns a normalised rating out of 100 to reviews from mainstream critics, the album has an average score of 63 out of 100 based on 8 reviews, which indicates "generally favorable reviews". Reviewing for AllMusic, Stephen Thomas Erlewine comments "Coldplay haven’t entirely been sucked into the machinery while trying to subvert pop music from within", giving the EP three and a half stars.

Harriet Gibson of The Guardian gave the EP three stars, writing "This EP is nothing but on-brand, however; euphoric emotion, an earnest, universal message and a coating of tacky charm". Mark Beaumont of the NME wrote "Coldplay don’t just churn out anthems. On their surprise-filled new EP, they test the waters and see what floats", and gave the EP four stars. Pitchfork's Jamieson Fox gave the EP 5.8 out of 10, writing "Kaleidoscope isn't going to kickstart Coldplay’s critical reappraisal, nor does it deserve to. But it rewards those of us who've stuck around with a few songs that capture the band at its best".

Writing for PopMatters, Mike Schiller comments "There’s no story to be told, just a small collection of tunes, some of which work beautifully, some of which fall utterly flat", giving the EP five stars out of ten, and Jon Dolan, reviewing for Rolling Stone wrote "Titled after a soothing interlude from the band's 2015 LP, A Head Full of Dreams, this five-song EP continues that album's mood of tranquil satisfaction" giving it three and a half stars.

== Track listing ==
All tracks are written by Coldplay except where noted.

Kaleidoscope EP track listing
No.	Title	Writer(s)	Producer(s)	Length
1.	"All I Can Think About Is You"		Rik Simpson	4:34
2.	"Miracles (Someone Special)" (with Big Sean)		Simpson; Bill Rahko	4:36
3.	"Aliens"	Coldplay; Brian Eno	Simpson; Eno; Markus Dravs	4:42
4.	"Something Just Like This (Tokyo Remix)" (with the Chainsmokers)	Coldplay; Andrew Taggart	The Chainsmokers	4:34
5.	"Hypnotised" (EP mix)		Simpson	6:31
Total length:				24:57

Notes

- "Hypnotised" is 6:31 long on digital releases, but 5:55 on physical editions, same as the promotional single version.

== Personnel ==
Coldplay

- Chris Martin – lead vocals, piano, keyboard, acoustic guitar on "Miracles (Someone Special)", "Aliens" and "Hypnotised"
- Jonny Buckland – guitars
- Guy Berryman – bass, keyboards
- Will Champion – drums, percussion, keyboards, electronic drums, backing vocals
- Phil Harvey

Additional musicians

- Big Sean - rapping (on "Miracles (Someone Special)")
- Brian Eno - additional guitar, and vocals (on "Aliens")
- The Chainsmokers - additional instruments (on "Something Just Like This")

== Charts ==
=== Weekly charts ===
Weekly chart performance
Chart (2017) (Note: According to the Official Charts Company rules, Kaleidoscope EP was not eligible for the UK Albums Chart.)	Peak position
Argentine Albums (CAPIF)	12
Australian Singles (ARIA) (Note: According to the Australian Recording Industry Association rules, Kaleidoscope EP was not eligible for the Australian Albums chart.)	56
Austrian Albums (Ö3 Austria)	11
Canadian Albums (Billboard)	10
Czech Albums (ČNS IFPI)	14
Danish Albums (Hitlisten)	12
French Albums (SNEP)	2
German Albums (Offizielle Top 100)	9
Hungarian Albums (MAHASZ)	31
Irish Albums (IRMA)	4
Italian Albums (FIMI)	1
Japanese Albums (Oricon)	25
Japanese Hot Albums (Billboard Japan)	39
Mexican Albums (AMPROFON)	5
New Zealand Albums (RMNZ)	12
Norwegian Albums (VG-lista)	37
Portuguese Albums (AFP)	7
Slovak Albums (ČNS IFPI)	8
Spanish Albums (Promusicae)	2
Swedish Albums (Sverigetopplistan)	8
Swiss Albums (Schweizer Hitparade)	3
US Billboard 200	15
US Top Alternative Albums (Billboard)	2
US Top Rock Albums (Billboard)	2

=== Year-end charts ===
Year-end chart performance
Chart (2017)	Position
French Albums (SNEP)	186
Italian Albums (FIMI)	43
Spanish Albums (Promusicae)	67
US Top Rock Albums (Billboard)	40

== Certifications and sales ==
Certifications and sales
Region	Certification	Certified units/sales
Italy (FIMI)	Gold	25,000^{*}
Japan	—	7,133 (Note: Japanese physical sales for Kaleidoscope EP as of October 2017.)
United Kingdom	—	46,510 (Note: British total sales for Kaleidoscope EP as of December 2018.)
^{*} Sales figures based on certification alone.
