= Hypnotised (Coldplay song) =

Promotional single by Coldplay

from the EP Kaleidoscope
- Released: 2 March 2017
- Genre: Soft rock
- Length: 5:55 (promotional version); 6:31 (EP mix)
- Label: Parlophone; Atlantic
- Songwriters: Guy Berryman; Jonny Buckland; Will Champion; Chris Martin
- Producers: Rik Simpson; Bill Rahko

Music video
- "Hypnotised" on YouTube

"Hypnotised" is a song by British rock band Coldplay from their EP Kaleidoscope (2017). It was released by Parlophone on 2 March 2017 as an excerpt from the EP instead of a single. The track was written by all four members of the band, while production was handled by Rik Simpson and Bill Rahko. A lyric video directed by Mary Wigmore came out on the same day. In June 2017, Brian Eno created an app available on iOS and Android devices to be played alongside the song to enhance it. The song was then followed by the release of "All I Can Think About Is You" and "Aliens", with the latter being a charity single.

== Track listing ==
Digital download
No.	Title	Length
1.	"Hypnotised"	5:55

== Personnel ==
Coldplay

- Guy Berryman – bass guitar
- Jonny Buckland – lead guitar
- Will Champion – drums, backing vocals, programming
- Chris Martin – lead vocals, piano, acoustic guitar, keyboards

Production

- Rik Simpson – production
- Bill Rahko – production

== Charts ==
Weekly chart performance
Chart (2017)	Peak position
Canada Hot 100 (Billboard)	81
France (SNEP)	185
Ireland (IRMA)	100
Italy (FIMI)	52
New Zealand Heatseekers (RMNZ)	1
Scottish Singles Sales (Official Charts)	37
South Korea BGM (Gaon)	57
Spain (Promusicae)	16
Switzerland (Schweizer Hitparade)	45
UK Singles (Official Charts)	70
US Bubbling Under Hot 100 (Billboard)	12
US Hot Rock & Alternative Songs (Billboard)	8
