= All I Can Think About Is You =

Song by Coldplay

from the EP Kaleidoscope
- Released: 15 June 2017
- Recorded: 2015–2016
- Genre: Alternative rock; dream pop; psychedelic rock
- Length: 4:34
- Label: Parlophone; Atlantic
- Composers: Guy Berryman; Jonny Buckland; Will Champion; Chris Martin
- Producers: Daniel Green; Rik Simpson

Music video
- "All I Can Think About Is You" on YouTube

"All I Can Think About Is You" is a song by British rock band Coldplay from Kaleidoscope EP (2017). It was released ahead of the extended play on 15 June 2017, following "Hypnotised" and preceding "Aliens". The track was composed by all four members of the band and produced by Dan Green along with Rik Simpson. A lyric video directed by I Saw John First came out on the same day.

== Critical reception ==
Colin Stutz of Billboard magazine wrote: "The understated song rides on a rolling bassline and steady rhythm with light guitar licks that mesmerize as they build to a soaring climax." He also noted that the lyric video is "equally trippy" as the track. Anna Gaca of Spin magazine called the song "unusually shoegaze-y". Andrew Pollard of Redbrick said that the song "feels like a celebration of their [Coldplay] distinct sound and musical past rather than a lazy rehash". Ben Kaye of Consequence of Sound said that the song has "a psychedelic dream of jammy guitars and gentle percussion". Muzikalia placed the track on their unranked "Best Songs of 2017" list.

== Track listing ==
Digital download
No.	Title	Length
1.	"All I Can Think About Is You"	4:34

== Credits and personnel ==
Credits adapted from Tidal.

Coldplay

- Chris Martin – lead vocals, piano, keyboard
- Jonny Buckland – electric guitar
- Guy Berryman – bass guitar
- Will Champion – drums, programming

Additional musicians

- Daniel Green – producing, keyboard
- Rik Simpson – producing, keyboard, background vocals, mixing, programming

Technical personnel

- Chris Allgood – mastering engineering
- Emily Lazar – mastering engineering
- Robin Baynton – engineering
- Aleks Von Korff – engineering
- Bill Rahko – engineering
- Tom Bailey – engineering
- Anthony De Souza – assistant engineering
- Laurence Anslow – assistant engineering
- Andrew Rugg – assistant engineering
- Owen Butcher – assistant engineering

== Charts ==
Weekly chart performance
Chart (2017)	Peak position
France (SNEP)	152
Iceland (RÚV)	15
Scottish Singles Sales (Official Charts)	78
UK Singles Downloads (Official Charts)	68
US Hot Rock & Alternative Songs (Billboard)	10
