= Coldplay =

British rock band

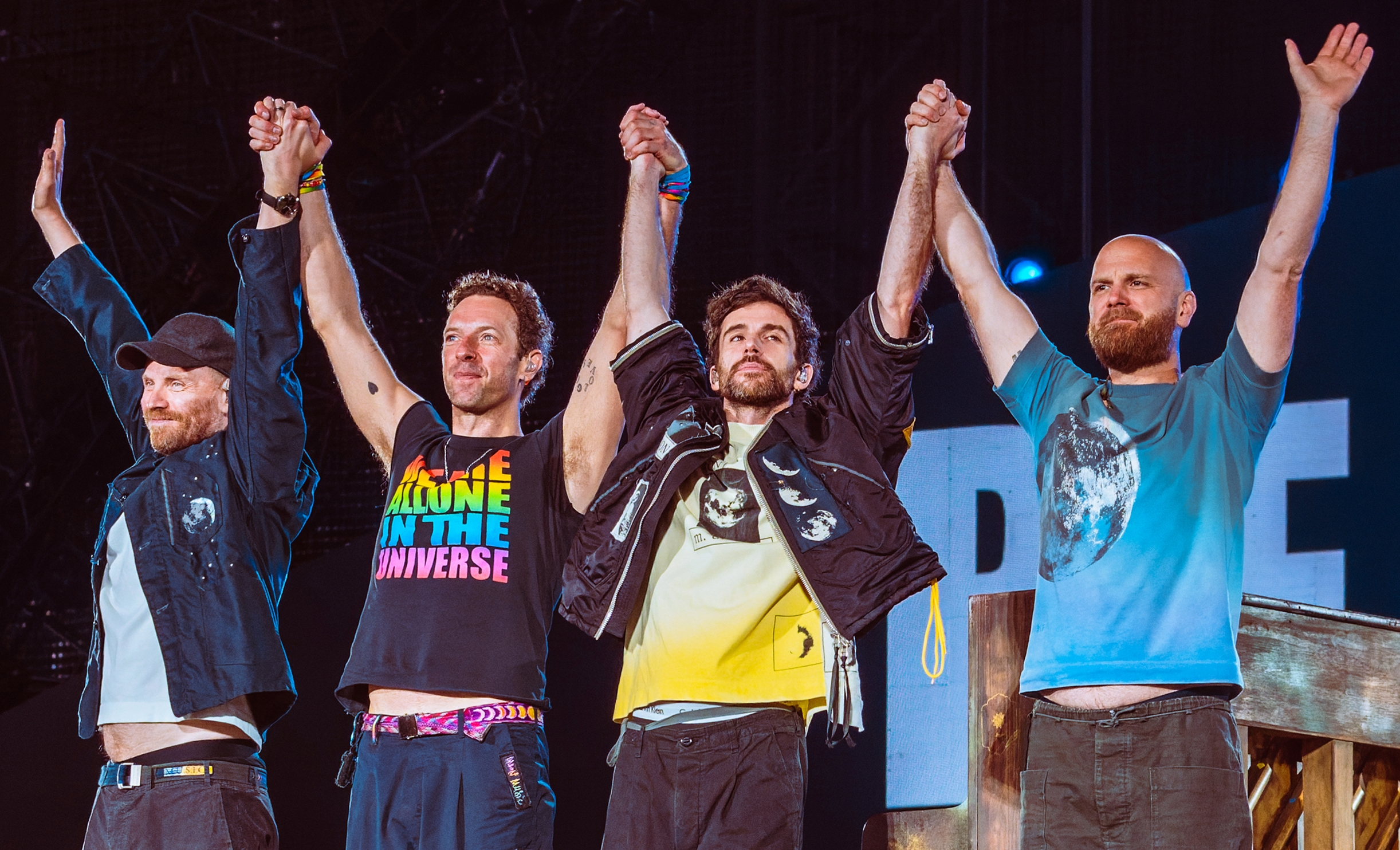
- Coldplay at Wembley Stadium in 2025; From left: Jonny Buckland, Chris Martin, Guy Berryman and Will Champion

Background information
- Also known as: Big Fat Noises (1997); Starfish (1998); Los Unidades (2018)
- Origin: London, England
- Genres: Alternative rock; pop rock; post-Britpop; pop
- Works: Discography; songs; videography; live performances
- Years active: 1997–present
- Labels: Fierce Panda; Parlophone; Nettwerk; Capitol; Atlantic
- Publishers: BMG; Universal
- Spinoffs: Apparatjik
- Awards: Full list
- Members: Chris Martin; Jonny Buckland; Guy Berryman; Will Champion; Phil Harvey
- Website: coldplay.com

Coldplay are a British rock band formed in London in 1997. They consist of vocalist and pianist Chris Martin, lead guitarist Jonny Buckland, bassist Guy Berryman and drummer Will Champion; manager Phil Harvey is also credited as a full member. The group are known for their live performances and have had a significant impact on popular culture.

Coldplay initially went by the names Big Fat Noises and Starfish. Following the independent release of the EP Safety (1998), the band signed a record deal with Parlophone in 1999 and issued their debut album, Parachutes (2000), which included the breakthrough single "Yellow"; the album won a Brit Award for British Album of the Year and a Grammy Award for Best Alternative Music Album. The follow-up, A Rush of Blood to the Head (2002), earned the same accolades. X&Y (2005) concluded what Coldplay viewed as a trilogy, and their fourth album, Viva la Vida or Death and All His Friends (2008), won a Grammy Award for Best Rock Album; both releases topped the charts in over 30 countries, becoming the best-sellers of their respective years worldwide. Viva la Vida's title track was the first song by a British act to reach number one in the United States and United Kingdom simultaneously in the 21st century.

The albums Mylo Xyloto (2011), Ghost Stories (2014), A Head Full of Dreams (2015), Everyday Life (2019), Music of the Spheres (2021) and Moon Music (2024) drew from genres such as electronica, R&B, ambient, disco, funk, gospel, blues and progressive rock. Music of the Spheres included the single "My Universe", which was the first song by a British group to debut at number one on the Billboard Hot 100, and the band's Music of the Spheres World Tour is the most-attended and second-highest-grossing tour of all time, becoming the first by a band to gross $1 billion. A documentary, Coldplay: A Head Full of Dreams, was released in 2018 for Coldplay's 20th anniversary. In 2023, they featured on the inaugural Time 100 Climate list.

With over 170 million records sold worldwide, Coldplay are one of the best-selling music acts of all time. They are also the first group in Spotify history to reach 100 million monthly listeners. Fuse listed them among the most awarded artists, which includes the record for most Brit Awards won by a band. In the United Kingdom, they have three of the 50 best-selling albums, the most UK Albums Chart number ones without missing the top (10), and are the most played group of the 21st century on British media. The British Phonographic Industry called them one of the world's most "influential and pioneering acts", while the Rock and Roll Hall of Fame added A Rush of Blood to the Head to the 200 Definitive Albums list and "Yellow" to the Songs That Shaped Rock and Roll exhibit. Coldplay are involved in philanthropy, politics and activism, supporting numerous humanitarian projects and donating 10% of their profits to charity. Despite their popularity, they are considered polarising cultural icons.

== History ==
=== 1997–1999: Formation and first years ===
The final name change came courtesy of close friend and fellow UCL student Tim Crompton. Tim was in the process of putting a band of old schoolmates together (later called Bettina Motive). While killing time waiting for a delayed removal van, he had considered the name after he found a copy of Philip Horky's book, Child's Reflections, Cold Play. Tim had a list of potential band names but Cold Play was quickly rejected; the future bandmates didn't like it, so they discarded it. Starfish were happy to pick it up.

— Life in Technicolor: A Celebration of Coldplay, 2018

Chris Martin and Jonny Buckland met during their first week at University College London, in September 1996. They began to write their first songs together in early 1997. Guy Berryman was the third to join the band months later, and the trio recorded numerous demos without a drummer, calling themselves Big Fat Noises by November. In January 1998, Will Champion joined. He said that Martin, Buckland and Berryman came to his house because his roommate was a good drummer with a drum kit; however, when the roommate did not arrive, Champion played instead.

Champion scheduled the band's live debut a few days later, on 16 January 1998 at the Laurel Tree in Camden. They had not chosen a proper name yet and called themselves Starfish. After settling on the name Coldplay, they released the EP Safety in May, financed by Martin's lifelong friend Phil Harvey. 150 out of 500 copies went to open market. Harvey sold the first one to his roommate for £3 and the rest were given to record labels.

As Martin complained about the "vice-like grip" one of the Camden promoters had on the band, Harvey suggested they book their own concert at Dingwalls; there, they sold 50 copies of Safety. The event is generally considered when Harvey officially became Coldplay's manager, and he eventually dropped out of his course at Trinity College, Oxford, to dedicate himself to the role. More concerts were scheduled for the summer. Martin tried to invite Tim Rice-Oxley to play keyboard for the band, but this was vetoed by the other band members. In September 1998, Coldplay performed at Manchester's In the City showcase, where they were discovered by A&R scout Debs Wild. Safety was followed by a cassette demo with "Ode to Deodorant" and "Brothers & Sisters".

Wild informed BMG Music Publishing's Caroline Elleray and lawyer Gavin Maude about the group. Elleray then talked to Dan Keeling at Parlophone, but he had already passed on them. Maude talked to Simon Williams from Fierce Panda, who contacted the BBC DJ Steve Lamacq. On 3 January 1999, Coldplay became the first unsigned act to appear on Lamacq's Evening Session. A month later, they signed a short-term contract with Fierce Panda and re-recorded "Brothers & Sisters". Six labels offered a contract as the band's popularity grew, but they wanted Parlophone, which led Elleray to meet Keeling again. He changed his mind, and the deal was signed at Trafalgar Square in April 1999, the same month in which "Brothers & Sisters" was released. The band spent the following days studying for UCL finals.

On 27 June 1999, Coldplay made their first appearance at the Glastonbury Festival in the New Bands Tent. They later recorded The Blue Room, which had 5,000 copies pressed and sold to the public. Its sessions were originally meant for Parachutes (2000), but became tumultuous due to Martin having heated discussions regarding Champion's abilities as a drummer. Martin said that "Three days later, the rest of us were feeling miserable and [...] we asked him to come back. They made me have lots of vodka and cranberry juice in remembrance of what a nasty piece of work I was being. Now if I find myself making a big mistake, I have to force myself to drink that stuff". After working out their differences, the band chose to operate as a democracy, established a new set of rules and proclaimed that anyone using hard drugs would be fired immediately, inspired by R.E.M. and U2.

=== 2000–2001: Parachutes ===
The band first planned to record their debut album, Parachutes, over the span of two weeks. However, due to tours and other live performances, the recording took place between September 1999 and May 2000. The album was initially recorded at Rockfield Studios, Matrix Studios and Wessex Sound Studios with producer Ken Nelson, although the majority of Parachutes' tracks were recorded at Liverpool's Parr Street Studios (where they used three studio rooms). American engineer Michael Brauer in New York mixed all of the songs for the album. During that time, they played on the Carling Tour, which showcased up-and-coming acts.

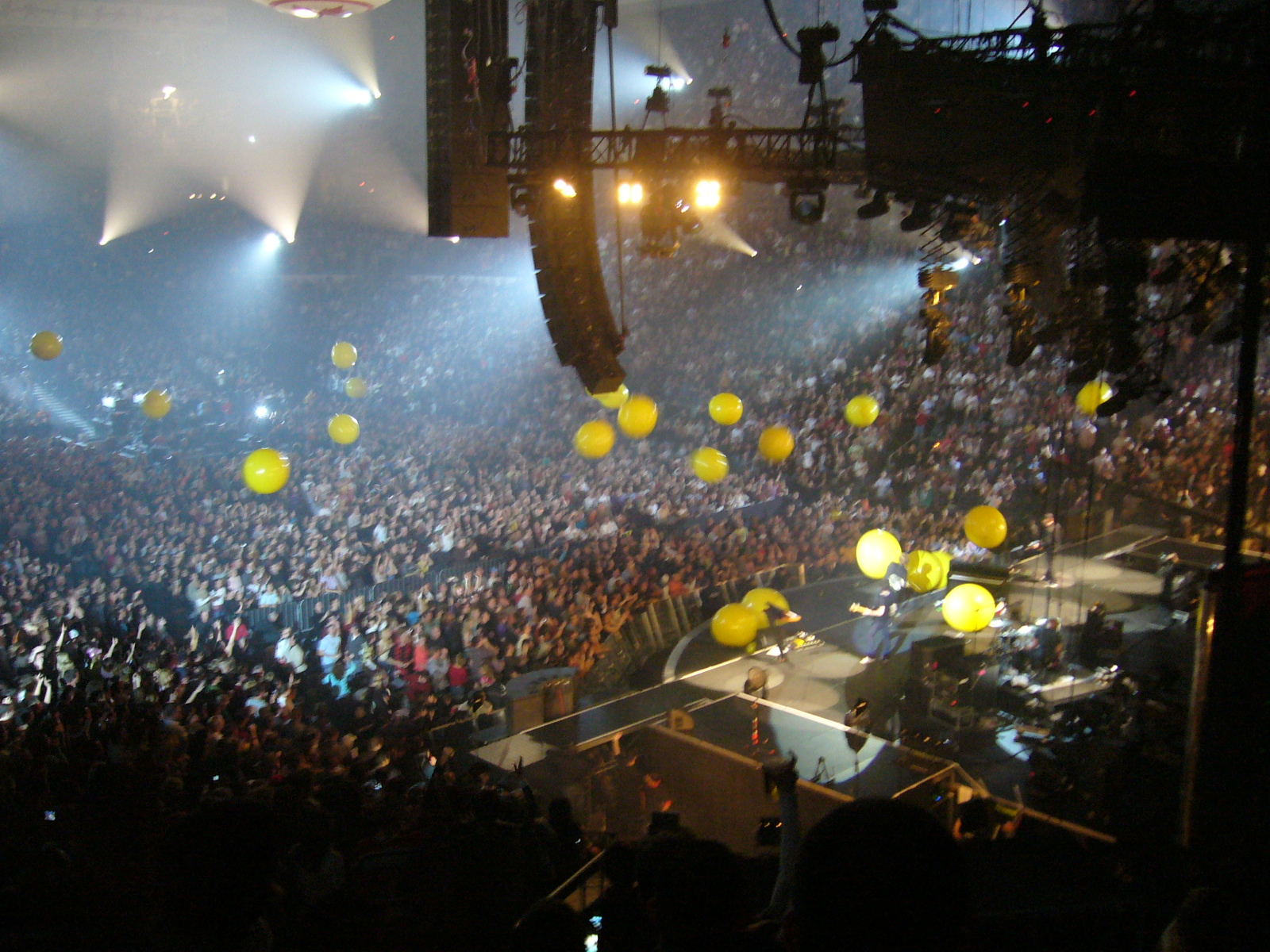
Coldplay performing "Yellow", their breakthrough hit, from the band's 2000 debut album Parachutes, in 2005

After releasing two EPs without a hit song, Coldplay had their first Top 40 hit with the lead single from Parachutes, "Shiver", which was released in March 2000, the same week Coldplay played The Forum in Tunbridge Wells supporting the band Terris as part of the NME Premier Tour. "Shiver" peaked at the number 35 position on the UK Singles Chart. June 2000 was a pivotal moment in Coldplay's history; they embarked on their first headlining tour, including a performance at the Glastonbury Festival. They also released the single "Yellow"; it was Coldplay's first release to reach the top five and rose to number four on the UK Singles Chart. The minimalistic music video for "Yellow" was filmed at Studland Bay in Dorset and featured Martin singing the song in one continuous shot as he walked along the beach. "Yellow" and "Shiver" were initially released as EPs in the spring of 2000. "Yellow" was released as a single in the United Kingdom on 26 June 2000. In the United States, it was released as the lead single from the then-untitled debut album. In October 2000, the track was sent to American college and alternative radio outlets.

Coldplay released Parachutes on 10 July 2000 in the United Kingdom via their record label, Parlophone. The album debuted at number one on the UK Albums Chart. It was released on 7 November 2000 by record label Nettwerk in North America. The album has been made available in various formats since its initial release; both Parlophone and Nettwerk released it as a CD in 2000, and it was also released as a Cassette by American label Capitol in 2001. In the following year, Parlophone issued the album as an LP. Four singles were released from Parachutes, including "Shiver" and "Yellow", and enjoyed popularity in the United Kingdom and United States. The third single was "Trouble", which reached number 10 on the UK Singles Chart. It was released more than a year later in the United States and reached number 28 in the Alternative Songs chart. In December 2001, the band released a limited-edition CD, Mince Spies, featuring a remix of "Yellow" and the Christmas song "Have Yourself a Merry Little Christmas". It was pressed to 1,000 copies and issued only to fans and journalists.

Parachutes was nominated for the Mercury Music Prize in September 2000. Having found success in Europe, the band targeted North America by releasing the album there in November 2000, and started the US Club Tour in February 2001. At the 2001 Brit Awards in February, Coldplay earned awards for Best British Group and Best British Album. Although Parachutes was a slow-burning success in the United States, it eventually reached double-platinum status. The album was critically well received and earned a Best Alternative Music Album honours at the 2002 Grammy Awards. Martin said the success was meant to make Coldplay the "biggest, best band in the world". After single-handedly managing the band until early 2001, Harvey resigned due to the stress of having to perform duties that typically require a team of people. He became the group's creative director and is often referenced as their fifth member; Dave Holmes replaced him as manager.

=== 2002–2004: A Rush of Blood to the Head ===
"The Scientist"
From the album A Rush of Blood to the Head, Martin wrote "The Scientist" after listening to George Harrison's "All Things Must Pass".

After the success of Parachutes, Coldplay returned to the studio in September 2001 to begin work on their second album, A Rush of Blood to the Head, once again with Ken Nelson producing. They had trouble focusing in London and relocated to Liverpool, where they recorded some of Parachutes. Once there, Martin said that they became obsessed with recording. "In My Place" was the first song recorded for the album. The band released it as the album's lead single because it was the track that made them want to record a second album, following a "strange period of not really knowing what we were doing" three months after the success of Parachutes. According to Martin "one thing kept us going: recording 'In My Place'. Then other songs started coming".

The band wrote more than 20 songs for the album. Some of their new material, including "In My Place" and "Animals", were played live while the band were still touring Parachutes. The album's title was revealed through a post on the band's official website. The album was released in August 2002 and spawned several successful singles, including "In My Place", "Clocks", and the ballad "The Scientist", which was inspired by George Harrison's 1970 song "All Things Must Pass". During the week of the album's release, Harvey quit, having struggled with the pressure that came with the band's early success, and went on to travel across South America and study in Australia.

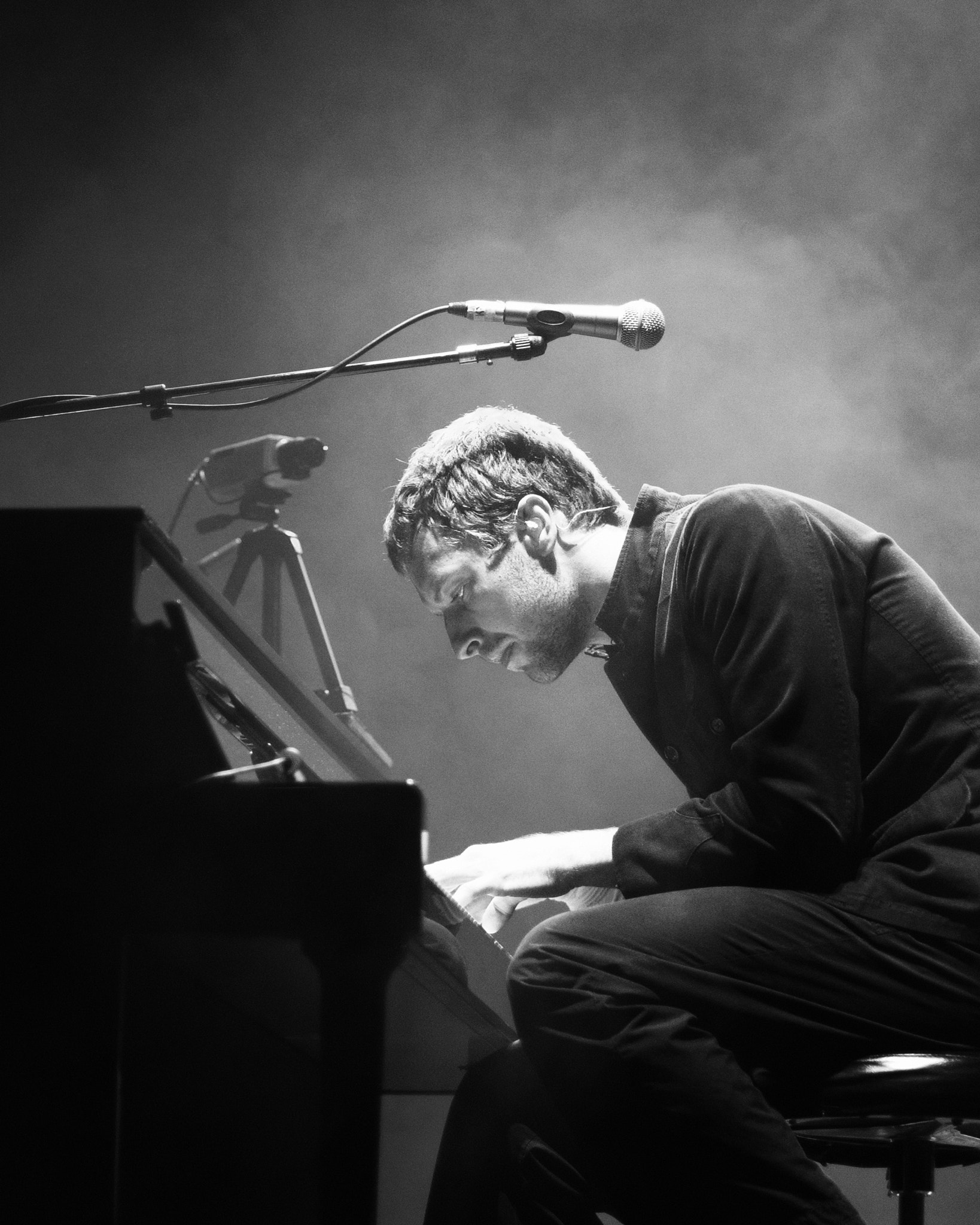
Martin performing with Coldplay in 2002

Coldplay toured from 19 June 2002 to 8 September 2003 for the Rush of Blood to the Head Tour. They visited five continents, including co-headlining festival dates at Glastonbury Festival, V2003 and Rock Werchter. Many concerts showcased elaborate lighting and individualised screens reminiscent of U2's Elevation Tour and Nine Inch Nails' Fragility Tour. During the extended tour, Coldplay recorded a live DVD and CD, Live 2003, at Sydney's Hordern Pavilion. At the 2003 Brit Awards held at Earls Court, London, Coldplay received awards for Best British Group and Best British Album. On 28 August 2003, Coldplay performed "The Scientist" at the 2003 MTV Video Music Awards at the Radio City Music Hall in New York City and won three awards.

In December 2003, readers of Rolling Stone magazine chose Coldplay as the best artist and the best band of the year. At that time the band covered the Pretenders' 1983 song "2000 Miles" (which was made available for download on their official website). "2000 Miles" was the top selling British download that year, with proceeds from the sales donated to Future Forests and Stop Handgun Violence campaigns. A Rush of Blood to the Head won the Grammy Award for Best Alternative Music Album at the 2003 Grammy Awards. At the 2004 Grammy Awards, Coldplay earned Record of the Year for "Clocks".

=== 2005–2007: X&Y ===
In 2004, Coldplay released a satirical music video of a song from a fictional band, the Nappies, while recording their third album. X&Y was released in June 2005 in the United Kingdom and Europe. This new, delayed release date had put the album back into the next fiscal year, and the late release was blamed for a drop in EMI's stock. It became the best-selling album of 2005 with worldwide sales of 8.3 million. The lead single, "Speed of Sound", made its radio and online music store debut on 18 April and was released as a CD on 23 May 2005. X&Y entered the album charts of 32 countries at the number one position and was the third-fastest-selling album in United Kingdom history. Following the release, Coldplay reinstated former manager Phil Harvey as a creative "jack of all trades", helping with creative elements such as designing live shows and producing music videos. He has since been credited as a member of the band.

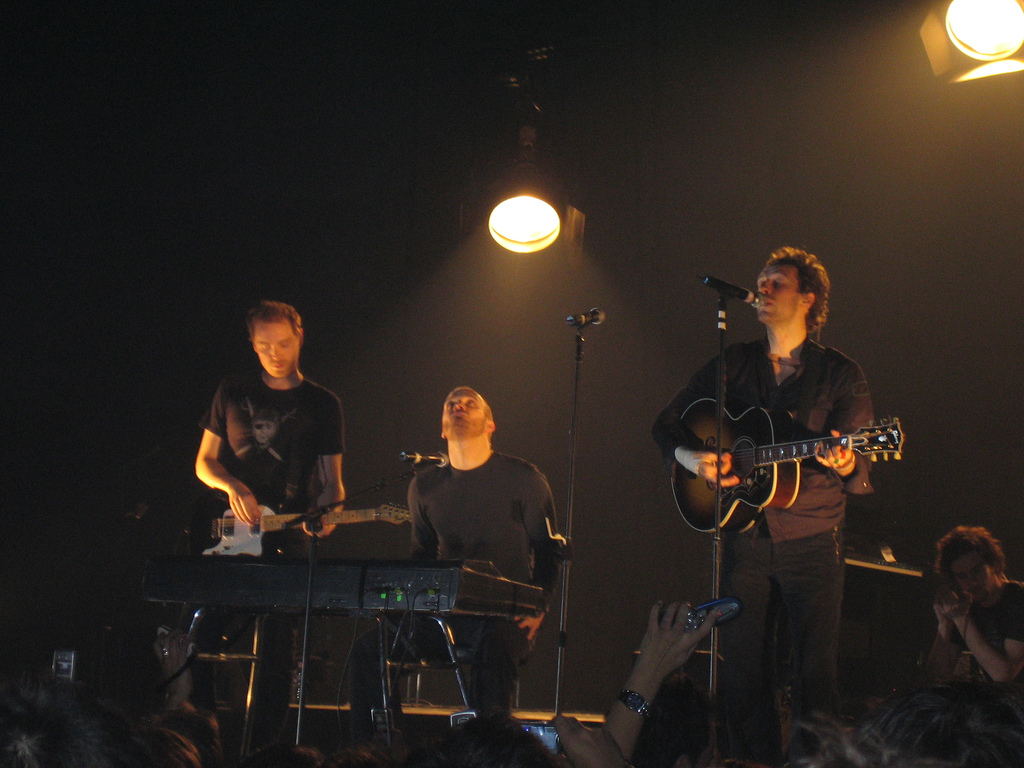
Coldplay performing in Barcelona during Twisted Logic Tour in 2005

Two other singles were released that year: "Fix You" in September and "Talk" in December. Critical reaction to X&Y was mostly positive, though slightly less enthusiastic than that of its predecessor. The New York Times critic Jon Pareles described Coldplay as "the most insufferable band of the decade", whereas NME awarded the album 9/10, calling it "confident, bold, ambitious, bunged with singles and impossible to contain ... X&Y doesn't reinvent the wheel but it does reinforce Coldplay as the band of their time." Comparisons to U2 became commonplace. Martin said the critical review of the album by the New York Times made him feel liberated as he "agreed with a lot of the points", adding that "in a way, it was liberating to see that someone else realised that also".

From June 2005 to March 2007, Coldplay went on their Twisted Logic Tour, which included festival dates like Coachella, Isle of Wight Festival, Glastonbury and the Austin City Limits Music Festival. In July 2005, the band appeared at Live 8 in Hyde Park, where they played a rendition of the Verve's "Bitter Sweet Symphony" with Richard Ashcroft on vocals. On 28 August, Coldplay performed "Speed of Sound" at the 2005 MTV Video Music Awards in Miami. In September, Coldplay recorded a new version of "How You See the World" with reworked lyrics for War Child's Help!: A Day in the Life charity album. In February 2006, Coldplay earned Best Album and Best Single honours at the Brit Awards. Three more singles were released during 2006 and 2007, "The Hardest Part", "What If" and "White Shadows".

=== 2008–2010: Viva la Vida or Death and All His Friends ===
In October 2006, Coldplay began work on their fourth studio album, Viva la Vida or Death and All His Friends, with producer Brian Eno. Taking a break from recording, the band toured Latin America in early 2007, finishing the Twisted Logic Tour while performing in Chile, Argentina, Brazil and Mexico. After recording in churches and other venues in Latin America and Spain during their tour, the band said the album would likely reflect Hispanic influence. The group then spent the rest of the year recording most of the album with Eno.

Martin described Viva la Vida as a new direction for Coldplay: a change from their past three albums, which the band felt was a "trilogy" that they had finished. He said the album featured less of his falsetto as he allowed his voice's lower register to take precedence. Some songs, such as "Violet Hill", contain distorted guitar riffs and bluesy undertones.

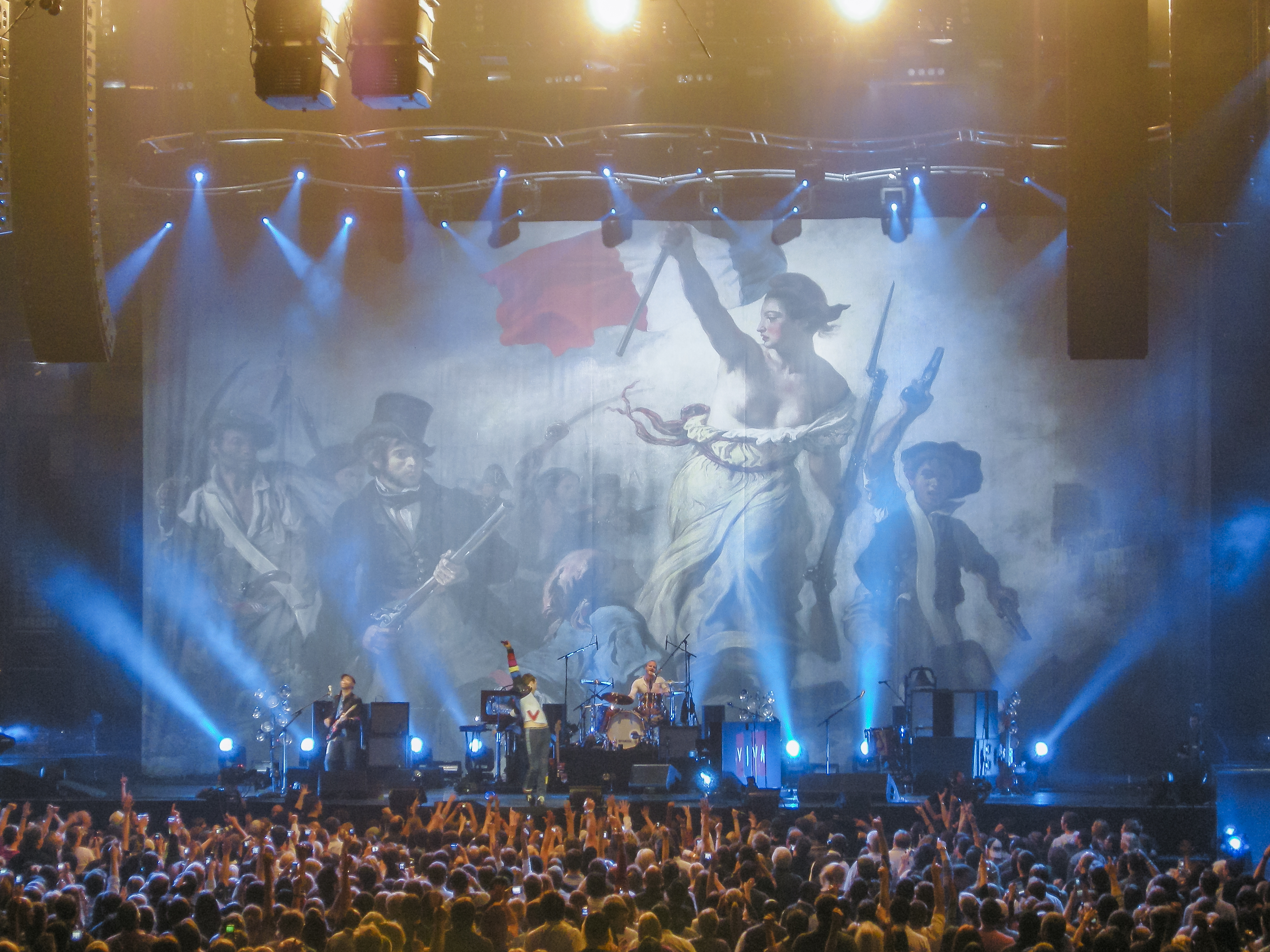
Coldplay on stage in Dallas, Texas, during the Viva la Vida Tour

"Violet Hill" was confirmed as the first single, with a radio release date of 29 April 2008. After the first play, it was freely obtainable from Coldplay's website from 12:15 pm (GMT +0) for one week until it became commercially available on 6 May. "Violet Hill" entered the Top 10 in the United Kingdom and the Top 40 in the United States. The title track, "Viva la Vida", was also released exclusively on iTunes; it became the band's first number-one single on both the Billboard Hot 100 and UK Singles Chart. Coldplay performed the song live for the first time at the 2008 MTV Movie Awards on 1 June. "Viva la Vida" became iTunes' best-selling song of 2008.

Viva la Vida or Death and All His Friends topped the album charts worldwide and was the world's best-selling album of 2008. It hit number one on the British albums chart despite having come on the market only three days previously. In that time, it sold 302,000 copies, being "one of the fastest-selling albums in the country's history". By the end of June, it had set a new record for most-downloaded album ever. In October 2008, Coldplay won two Q Awards for Best Album for Viva la Vida or Death and All His Friends and Best Act in the World Today. On 9 November, Coldplay were named the World's Best-selling Act of 2008 at the World Music Awards in Monte Carlo. They also picked up two other awards: World's Best-selling Rock Act and Great Britain's Best-selling Act. The band followed up Viva la Vida or Death and All His Friends with the Prospekt's March EP, which was released on 21 November 2008. The extended play features songs from the album sessions and was originally made available on its own, while the album got re-issued with all EP tracks included on a bonus disc. "Life in Technicolor II" was the only single released.

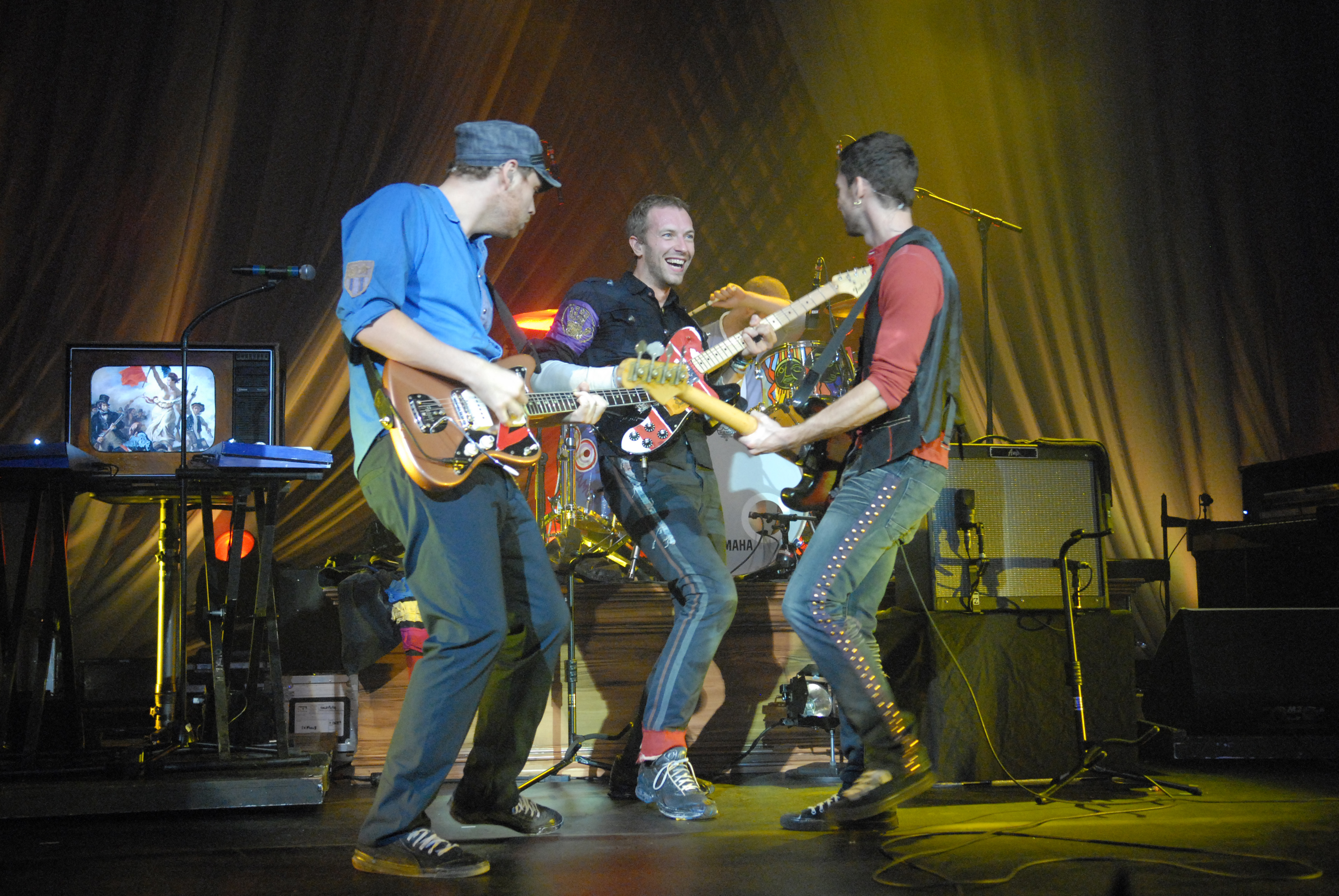
Coldplay performing at New York's Hammerstein Ballroom in 2008

Coldplay began their Viva la Vida Tour in June with a free concert at Brixton Academy in London. This was followed two days later by a 45-minute performance that was broadcast live from outside BBC Television Centre. Released in late 2008, "Lost!" became the third single from the album, featuring a new version with Jay-Z called "Lost+". After performing the opening set on 14 March 2009 for Sound Relief at the Sydney Cricket Ground, Coldplay headlined a sold-out concert later that same night. Sound Relief is a benefit concert for victims of the Victorian Bushfire Crisis and the Queensland Floods. On 4 December 2008, Joe Satriani filed a copyright infringement lawsuit against Coldplay in the California Central District Court. Satriani claimed that "Viva la Vida" incorporates "substantial, original portions" of his song "If I Could Fly" from the album Is There Love in Space? (2004). Coldplay denied the allegation. In 2009, "Viva la Vida" won a Grammy Award for Song of the Year and Best Pop Performance by a Duo or Group with Vocals. The lawsuit was eventually dismissed, with the judge declaring that both the parties should bear their own trial costs.

Coldplay were nominated for four awards at the 2009 Brit Awards: British Group, British Live Act, British Single ("Viva la Vida") and British Album (Viva la Vida or Death and All His Friends). At the 51st Grammy Awards in the same year, Coldplay won three Grammy Awards in the categories for Song of Year for "Viva la Vida", Best Rock Album for Viva la Vida or Death and All His Friends, and Best Vocal Pop Performance by a Duo or Group for "Viva la Vida". A live album titled LeftRightLeftRightLeft was recorded at various shows during the tour, being released on their website as a free download on 15 May 2009 and given away at the remaining concerts of the Viva la Vida Tour. In October 2009, Coldplay won Song of the Year for "Viva la Vida" at the American Society of Composers, Authors and Publishers (ASCAP) Awards in London. Two months later, Rolling Stone readers listed the band as the fourth-best musicians of the 2000s. In August 2010, Coldplay extended their publishing deal with Universal; the company worked with the group since 2007, when it acquired their original publisher, BMG. "Christmas Lights" was released four months later. The song received very positive reviews, and the music video features a cameo from actor Simon Pegg, a close friend of Martin, who plays a violin-playing Elvis impersonator in the background.

=== 2011–2012: Mylo Xyloto ===
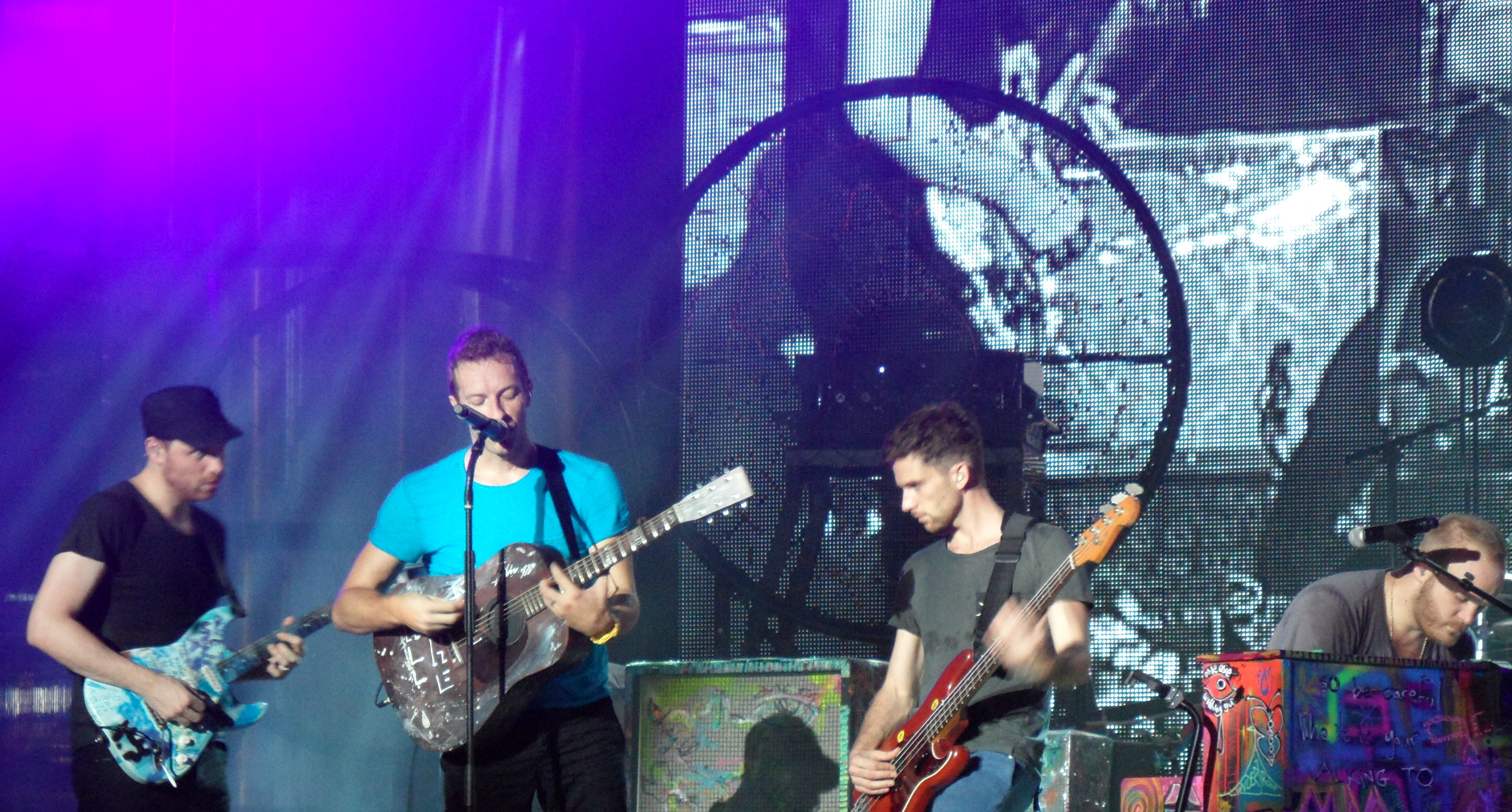
Coldplay playing at MuchMusic in Toronto, September 2011

The band finished recording their new album in mid-2011. When Martin and Champion were interviewed by BBC Radio and asked about the album's lyrical themes, Martin replied "It's about love, addiction, OCD, escape and working for someone you don't like". When asked whether or not their fifth album would be out by the summer, Martin and Champion said that there was plenty of work to be done before releasing it. They confirmed several festival appearances before its release date, including a headlining spot at the 2011 Glastonbury Festival, T in the Park, Austin City Limits Music Festival, Rock in Rio and Lollapalooza festival.

In an interview on 13 January 2011, Coldplay mentioned that two new songs would be included on their upcoming fifth album, "Princess of China" and "Every Teardrop Is a Waterfall". In a February interview, Parlophone president Miles Leonard told HitQuarters that the band were still in the studio working on the album and that he expected the final version would appear "towards the autumn of this year". On 31 May 2011, Coldplay announced that "Every Teardrop Is a Waterfall" was the first single for the fifth album. It was released on 3 June 2011. The band presented five new songs at festivals during the summer of 2011, "Charlie Brown", "Hurts Like Heaven", "Us Against the World", "Princess of China" and "Major Minus".

On 12 August 2011, Coldplay announced via their official website that Mylo Xyloto was the new album title and that it would be released on 24 October 2011. On 12 September the band released "Paradise", the second single from their upcoming album Mylo Xyloto. On 23 September 2011, tickets for Coldplay's European tour went on sale; the high demand led venues to be sold out in seconds. Mylo Xyloto was released on 24 October 2011. It received positive reviews and topped the charts in over 34 countries.

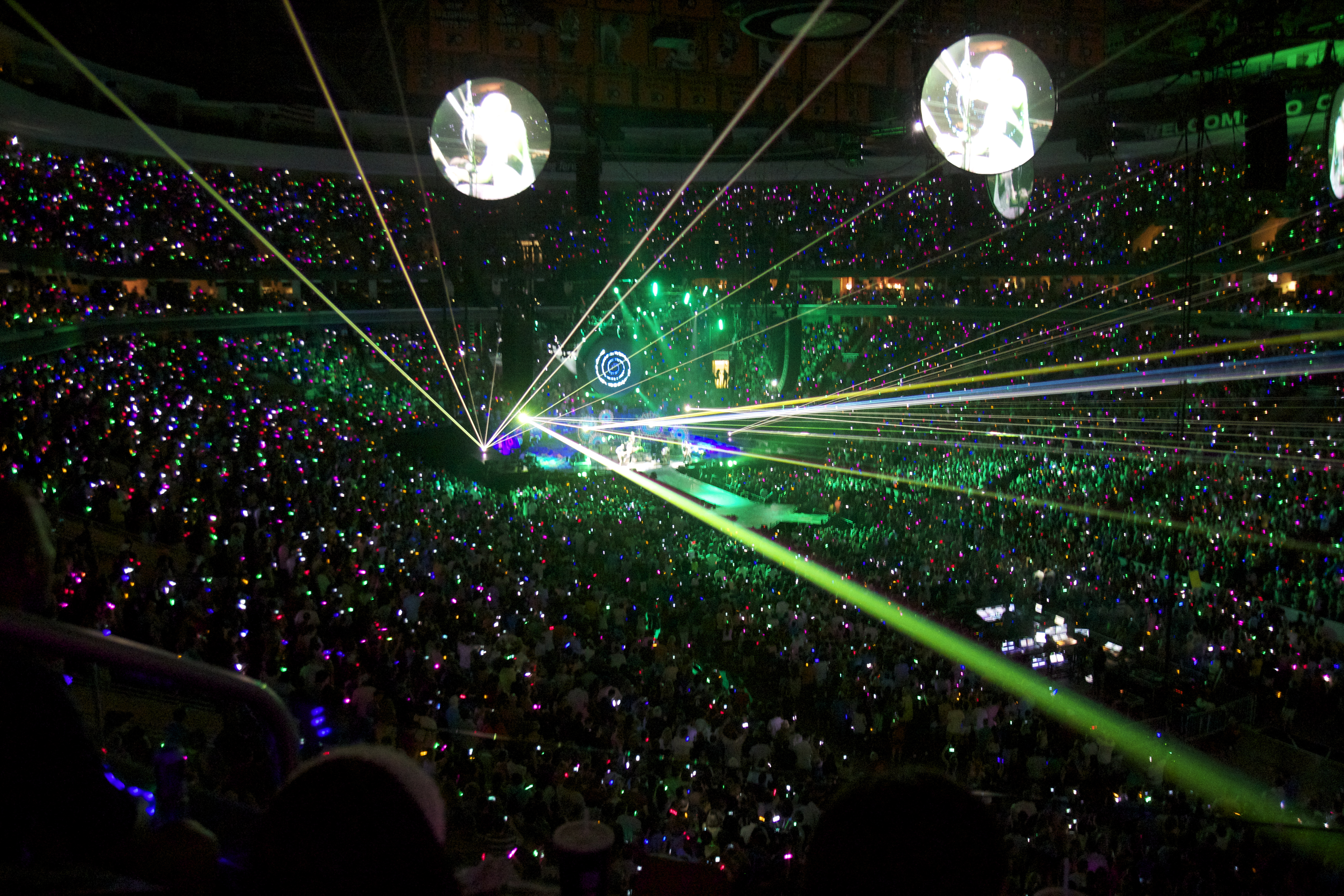
The laser and light effects from the group's Mylo Xyloto Tour

On 19 October 2011, Coldplay performed songs at Apple Inc.'s private memorial for Steve Jobs, including "Viva la Vida", "Fix You", "Yellow" and "Every Teardrop Is a Waterfall". On 26 October their "Amex Unstaged" concert at the Plaza de Toros de Las Ventas in Madrid, Spain, was streamed by YouTube as a live webcast directed by Anton Corbijn. On 30 November 2011, Coldplay received three Grammy Award nominations for the 54th Annual Grammy Awards which took place on 12 February 2012 in Los Angeles, and the band performed with Rihanna at the ceremony. On 12 January 2012, Coldplay were nominated for two Brit Awards. On 21 February 2012, they were awarded the Brit Award for Best British Group for the third time. The album was the best-selling rock album in the United Kingdom, selling 908,000 copies. The album's second single, "Paradise", was also the best-selling rock single in the UK, selling 410,000 copies. At the 2012 MTV Video Music Awards, "Paradise" won Best Rock Video. Mylo Xyloto has sold over 8 million copies globally.

Coldplay headlined the closing ceremony of the London 2012 Paralympic Games on 9 September 2012, where they performed alongside other artists including Rihanna and Jay-Z. To tie in with their performance at the closing ceremony, the group gave permission for bands who were participating in the Bandstand Marathon the opportunity to perform their 2008 single "Viva la Vida" to celebrate the end of the games.

In October 2012, the music video for Coldplay's song "Hurts Like Heaven" was released. The video was based on the story of Mylo Xyloto, a boy who grew up in tyranny run by Major Minus. The fictional comics titled Mylo Xyloto continued on the story portrayed in the music video when the series was released in early 2013. A concert documentary film and live album Live 2012 chronicles their tour in support of the Mylo Xyloto album. The film premiered theatrically for one night only, 13 November 2012, and was released on CD and home video on 19 November 2012.

On 21 November, after a concert in Brisbane, Australia as part of the group's Mylo Xyloto Tour, Coldplay hinted they were set to take a three-year break from touring. They performed two shows with Jay-Z in the Barclays Center, Brooklyn, New York, on 30 December and New Year's Eve, which ended the Mylo Xyloto Tour. The Mylo Xyloto Tour was named the fourth-highest-grossing tour of 2012 worldwide with more than $171.3 million earned from ticket sales.

=== 2013–2014: Ghost Stories ===
In an interview from late 2012 with Australian radio station 2Day FM, Martin revealed that the title for the band's next album would be "much easier to pronounce". Martin debunked speculation that they were taking a break from touring by saying, "This three-year break idea only came about because I said at a gig in Australia that we might not be back there for three years. That's probably true, but that's just how a world tour works. No chance are we taking a three-year break".

On 9 August 2013, Coldplay announced the release of "Atlas", which was featured on the soundtrack for the film The Hunger Games: Catching Fire. Its release got pushed back to 6 September 2013 (everywhere but the UK) and 8 September (UK). In December 2013, it was announced that future Coldplay releases would be distributed by Atlantic in the United States due to the restructuring within Warner Music following the purchase of Parlophone from EMI.

On 25 February 2014, the band unveiled "Midnight", a track from their yet-to-be-released album. In early March 2014, it was announced that the band's sixth album, Ghost Stories, would be released 19 May 2014. According to Martin, Ghost Stories is a spiritually driven album that revolves around two major themes; it explores the idea of past actions and the effects they can have on your future and one's capacity for unconditional love. The band took a different approach for their sixth studio album in contrast to their previous studio albums, with Martin inviting the band to contribute original songwriting material for the album, as opposed to building songs off his ideas as they had done during previous recording sessions.

From April to July, Coldplay embarked on a six-date Ghost Stories Tour in support of the album, playing "intimate" shows in six cities: the Beacon Theatre in New York City on 5 May, Royce Hall in Los Angeles on 19 May, Casino de Paris in Paris on 28 May, Tokyo Dome City Hall in Tokyo on 12 June, Enmore Theatre in Sydney on 19 June and finally Royal Albert Hall in London on 2 July 2014. The album was made available for pre-order on iTunes, alongside new single "Magic". Two more singles from the album, "A Sky Full of Stars" and "True Love", were then released. Ghost Stories received mixed to positive reviews. The album topped the charts in the United Kingdom, the United States and most major markets. It received a Grammy Award nomination for Best Pop Vocal Album, and "A Sky Full of Stars" was nominated for Best Pop Duo/Group Performance. In December 2014, Spotify named Coldplay the most-streamed band in the world for 2014, as well as third most-streamed artist behind Ed Sheeran and Eminem.

=== 2015–2018: A Head Full of Dreams ===
On 4 December 2014, Martin announced in an interview with Zane Lowe on BBC Radio 1 that Coldplay were in the middle of working on their seventh studio album, A Head Full of Dreams. Martin remarked it might be the band's final album and compared it to Harry Potter: "It's our seventh thing, and the way we look at it, it's like the last Harry Potter book or something like that". He added that unlike their promotion efforts for Ghost Stories, the band would tour for the seventh record. In an interview with Jo Whiley on BBC Radio 2, Martin hinted at the style of the album by saying that the band were trying to make something colourful and uplifting yet not bombastic. He also stated that it would be something to "shuffle your feet" to.

On 11 December 2014, the band unveiled a new song, "Miracles", which was written and recorded for the World War II drama film Unbroken directed by Angelina Jolie. At the 2015 Billboard Music Awards on 17 May, Ghost Stories was named Top Rock Album. On 26 September, Coldplay performed at the 2015 Global Citizen Festival in Central Park's Great Lawn in New York, an event organised by Martin advocating for an end to extreme global poverty. Coldplay, along with Beyoncé, Ed Sheeran and Pearl Jam, headlined the festival, which was broadcast on NBC in the United States on 27 September and the BBC in the United Kingdom on 28 September.

Speaking on Nick Grimshaw's Radio 1 Breakfast Show on the BBC on 6 November, Coldplay confirmed 4 December as the release date of A Head Full of Dreams, and a new song from the album, "Adventure of a Lifetime", premiered on the show. The album has guest appearances from Beyoncé, Gwyneth Paltrow, Noel Gallagher, Tove Lo and Barack Obama. The album reached number one in the UK, and number two in the US, Australia and Canada among others where it was kept in second place by Adele's 25. The music video for "Adventure of a Lifetime" featured the band performing as chimpanzees. They were provided consultation with renowned performance capture actor Andy Serkis.

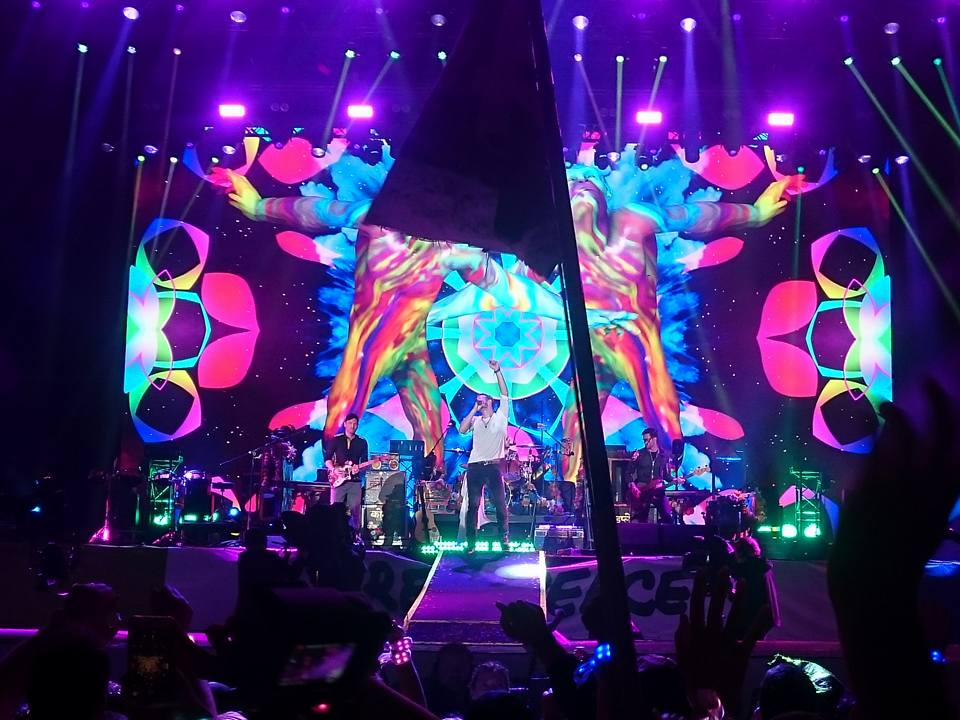
Coldplay performing "Adventure of a Lifetime" during their headline set at Glastonbury 2016. It was their sixth overall appearance at the festival and the fourth topping the bill.

On 27 November 2015, the first dates to the Head Full of Dreams Tour were announced. Latin American and European stops were listed, which included three dates at Wembley Stadium, London in June. The North America Tour, an extra Wembley concert and an Oceania tour were later added. On 5 December, the band headlined the opening day of the 2015 Jingle Bell Ball at London's O_{2} Arena. On 7 February 2016, they headlined the Super Bowl 50 halftime show and were joined by Beyoncé and Bruno Mars. In April 2016, the band were named the sixth best-selling artist worldwide in 2015.

On 26 June 2016, Coldplay closed the final day of the Glastonbury Festival in England. Their performance included a duet with Barry Gibb, the last surviving member of the Bee Gees. During the band's second night at MetLife Stadium in New Jersey on 18 July, Coldplay were joined onstage by Michael J. Fox to recreate a Back to the Future scene. Martin sang "Earth Angel" before introducing Fox onstage to join the band in performing the Chuck Berry classic "Johnny B. Goode".

The band performed a full set in India for the first time as part of the Global Citizen Festival in Mumbai on 19 November 2016. This performance was attended by 80,000 people and also featured many Bollywood stars during the concert. The same month, Coldplay announced in interviews with Absolute Radio that they would be releasing new songs in a record called the Kaleidoscope EP. Described as a leftover "bag of ideas" from the recording of A Head Full of Dreams, Martin stated that it would be released in "a couple of months".

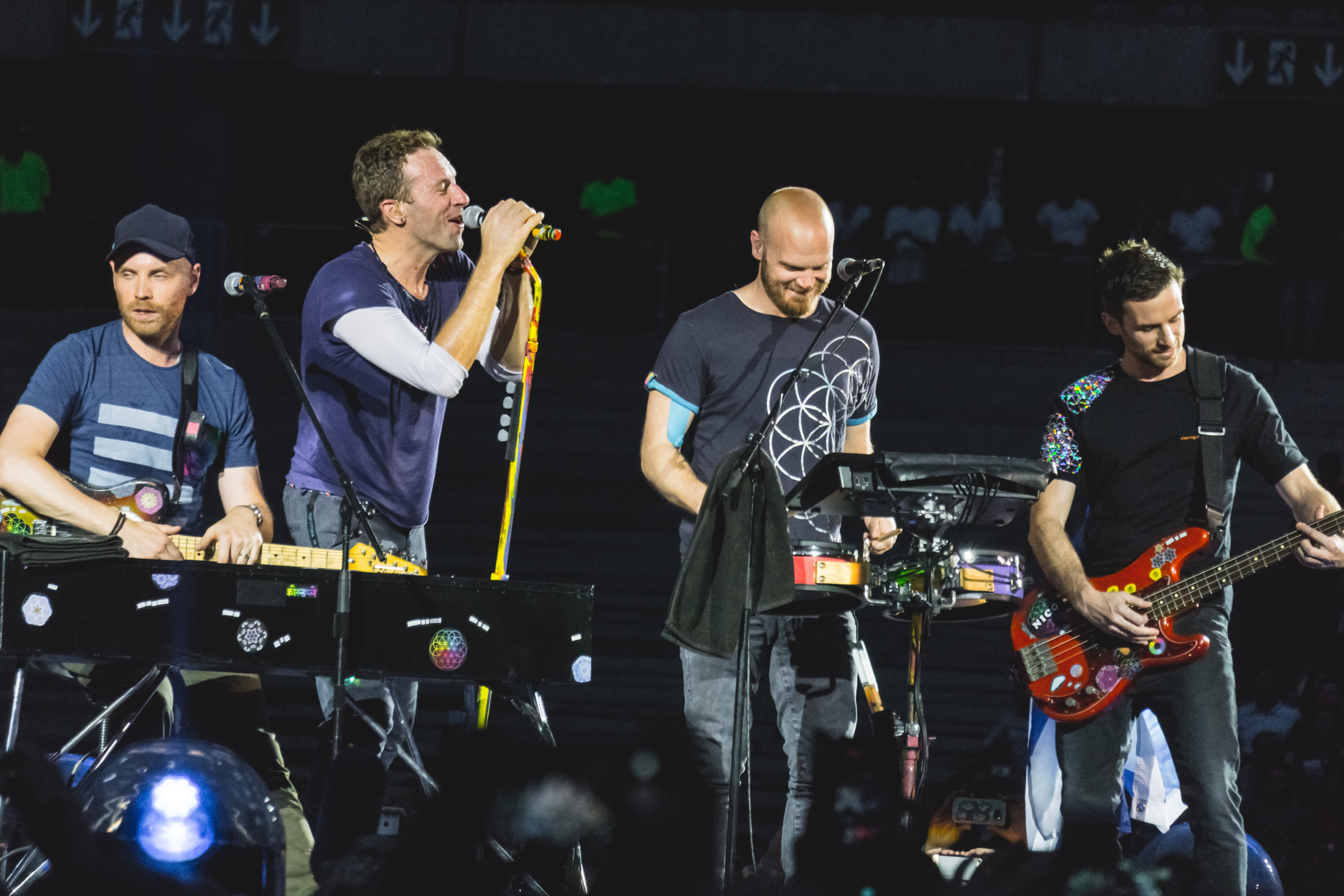
Coldplay playing the second of three sold-out concerts at Stade de France in Paris, July 2017

On 22 February 2017, the band released a collaboration track with EDM duo The Chainsmokers, called "Something Just Like This". Reaching number 2 on the UK Singles Chart and number 3 on the Billboard Hot 100, it was the lead single from the Kaleidoscope EP. They premiered the song live at the 2017 Brit Awards, with Martin also performing a tribute to George Michael. On 2 March, Martin's birthday, Coldplay released a new track from the EP, "Hypnotised". Two further releases from, "All I Can Think About Is You" and "Aliens", came out on 15 June and 6 July respectively.

On 8 October 2017, Coldplay debuted live their new song called "Life Is Beautiful" at SDCCU Stadium in San Diego. This part of the show was broadcast at the end of Estamos Unidos Mexicanos, a benefit concert at Mexico City's Zócalo. Proceeds from the song and concert were donated to relief efforts after the Puebla earthquake. On 15 November 2017, the Head Full of Dreams Tour finished with a total gross of $523 million from 5.38 million tickets sold, ranking as the third-highest-grossing concert tour of all time. On 30 November 2018, Coldplay released Global Citizen – EP 1 under the name Los Unidades, with proceeds donated towards efforts to end global poverty. Their fifth live album, Live in Buenos Aires, arrived on 7 December 2018 with footage from the final concert of the tour in La Plata.

=== 2019–2020: Everyday Life ===
On 18 October 2019, mysterious black-and-white posters began appearing in numerous countries around the world, with Coldplay wearing vintage-style clothing and a date showing 22 November 1919. The band also changed their profile pictures on social media to a sun and moon, making fans speculate an imminent release of new material. On 19 October 2019, a cryptic five-second teaser was released on social media with orchestral music in the background. On 21 October 2019, in a letter sent to fans, the band announced that their eighth studio album would be titled Everyday Life. It serves as a double album, with the first half titled Sunrise and the second half titled Sunset.

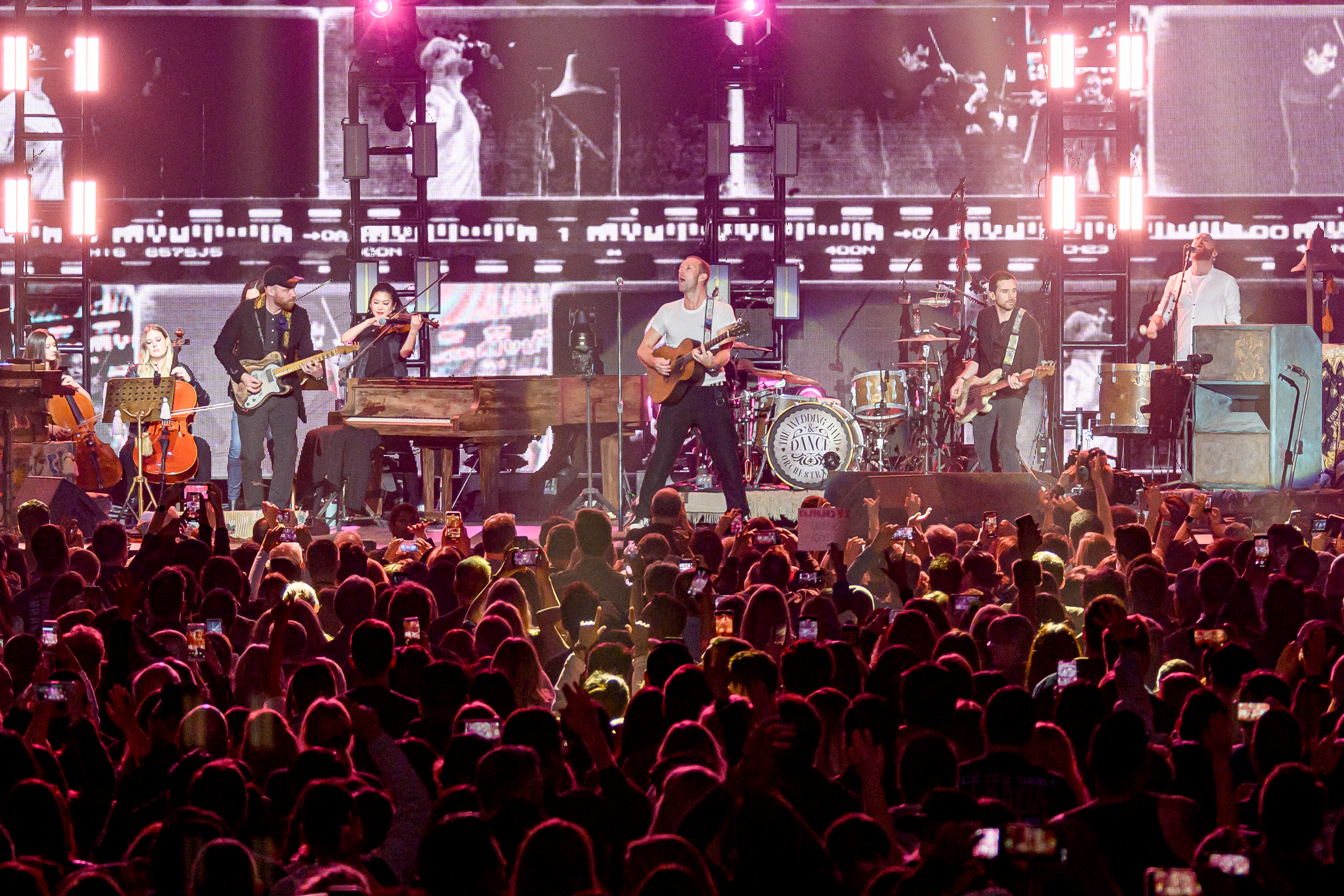
Coldplay performing at the ALTer EGO concert in January 2020

On 23 October 2019, the album's track list was revealed on the advertisements from local newspapers in the United Kingdom; those included the Daily Post in North Wales (with whom Buckland once had a holiday job) and Express & Echo in Exeter (Martin's hometown). Double lead singles "Orphans" and "Arabesque" were released on 24 October 2019 during the Annie Mac show on BBC Radio 1. "Arabesque" was the first Coldplay song to feature profanity. The album was released on 22 November 2019 and accompanied by a double concert at the Amman Citadel in Jordan. The performance was broadcast live on YouTube, being carried out at sunrise and sunset to match the album's two halves. Inside the Everyday Life booklet, the words "Music of the Spheres" appeared written on a billboard.

Martin had earlier said that the band would not tour to promote the album until they could work out "how our tour can not only be sustainable (but) how can it be actively beneficial", and hope that it would be entirely carbon-neutral. However, Coldplay performed a one-off show on 25 November 2019 for the charity ClientEarth at London's Natural History Museum. The band played beneath Hope, a giant 128-year-old skeleton of a blue whale in the museum's great hall. The album debuted at number one on the UK Albums Chart with 81,000 copies sold, making it the band's eighth consecutive number-one album. It was also the third fastest-selling album of 2019, behind No.6 Collaborations Project and Divinely Uninspired to a Hellish Extent. On 24 November 2020, Coldplay received two nominations for the 63rd Annual Grammy Awards, with one of them being Album of the Year, their first nomination in the category since Viva la Vida. On 21 December 2020, "Flags" was released internationally, the song was originally included as a Japanese bonus track of Everyday Life.

=== 2021–present: Music of the Spheres and Moon Music ===
On 29 April 2021, Coldplay announced "Higher Power" for release on 7 May 2021, coinciding with a video livestream from the International Space Station. Martin stated in an interview with Lowe that the band would be working with producer Max Martin and his team on both the song and the new album. He said, "Max is our producer right now for everything we do". On 4 May 2021, they were revealed as the opening act for the 2021 Brit Awards, where they performed "Higher Power" for the first time.

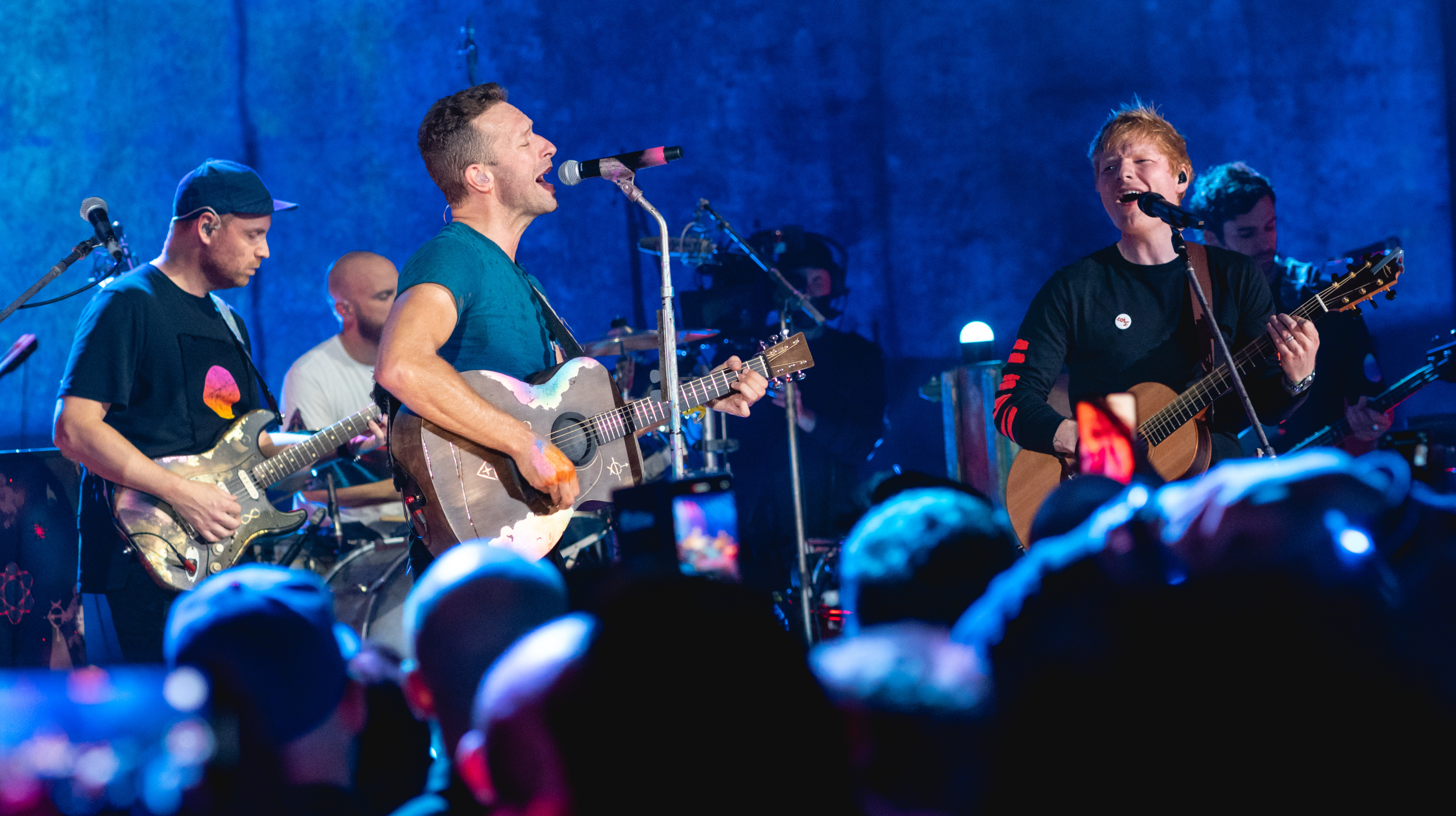
Coldplay with Ed Sheeran at the O_{2} Shepherd's Bush Empire in 2021

On 22 May 2021, the band participated in the Live at Worth Farm broadcast, showcasing a new song called "Human Heart" with R&B duo We Are King. On 8 June 2021, the official music video for "Higher Power", directed by Dave Meyers, premiered on YouTube, following a visualiser with Coldplay performing the song while dancing with CGI alien holograms that premiered on 7 May 2021. On 20 July 2021, the group announced that their ninth album, Music of the Spheres, would be released on 15 October 2021, and scheduled the closing track "Coloratura" for release on 23 July 2021 in anticipation for the project.

On 13 September 2021, Coldplay announced that the album's second single, "My Universe", a collaboration with South Korean pop group BTS, would be made available on 24 September 2021. The song debuted at number three on the UK Singles Chart, becoming their first Top 10 single in the country since "Something Just Like This" in 2017. It also debuted at number one on the Billboard Hot 100. A short documentary about the collaboration was released on 26 September 2021 on the official BTS YouTube channel.

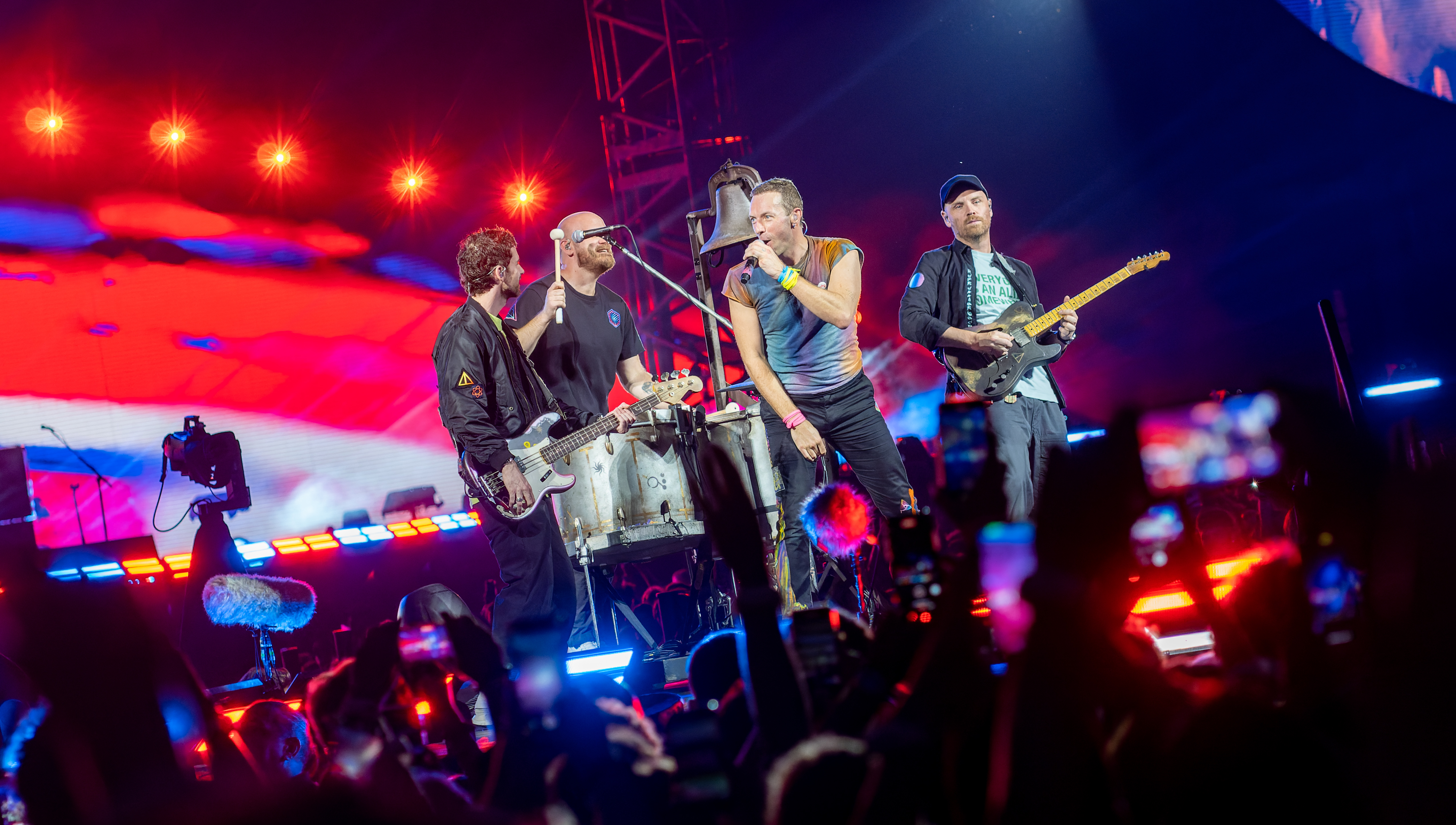
Coldplay performing at Wembley Stadium in August 2022 during the Music of the Spheres World Tour

Music of the Spheres went number one the UK Albums Chart with 101,045 units sold, becoming the fastest-selling record in the country since Ed Sheeran's No.6 Collaborations Project (2019). It debuted at number four on the Billboard 200 chart and reached the top on both the Top Alternative Albums and the Top Rock Albums charts. On 14 October 2021, Coldplay announced the Music of the Spheres World Tour, which began in San José's Estadio Nacional de Costa Rica on 18 March 2022 and visited over 40 countries afterward.

The concert run's announcement also included a series of environmental plans developed in two years with help from sustainability experts; they were aimed at reducing CO_{2} emissions by 50% in comparison to the Head Full of Dreams Tour. The shows became a leading topic of news coverage in visited regions and boosted local economies, and Coldplay's discography experienced a resurgence in sales and streaming. The band also managed to beat their initial carbon footprint target, reducing it by 59% as of June 2024.

In November 2021, "Higher Power" was nominated for Best Pop Duo/Group Performance at the 64th Annual Grammy Awards. During the following month, Martin said that Coldplay would release three more albums until 2025, one being "kind of a musical" and the other a "back to the basics" self-titled record. However, he added the band would remain active through other projects and tours afterwards. In 2022, manager Dave Holmes severed ties with Coldplay, eventually leading to a contractual dispute. Harvey assumed management again, but with assistance from Mandi Frost and Arlene Moon. That same year, the band released a piano version of "Let Somebody Go" and a cover of Kid Cudi's "Day 'n' Nite" for the Spotify Singles series. On 15 November 2022, they received three nominations at the 65th Annual Grammy Awards, including Album of the Year and Best Pop Vocal Album.

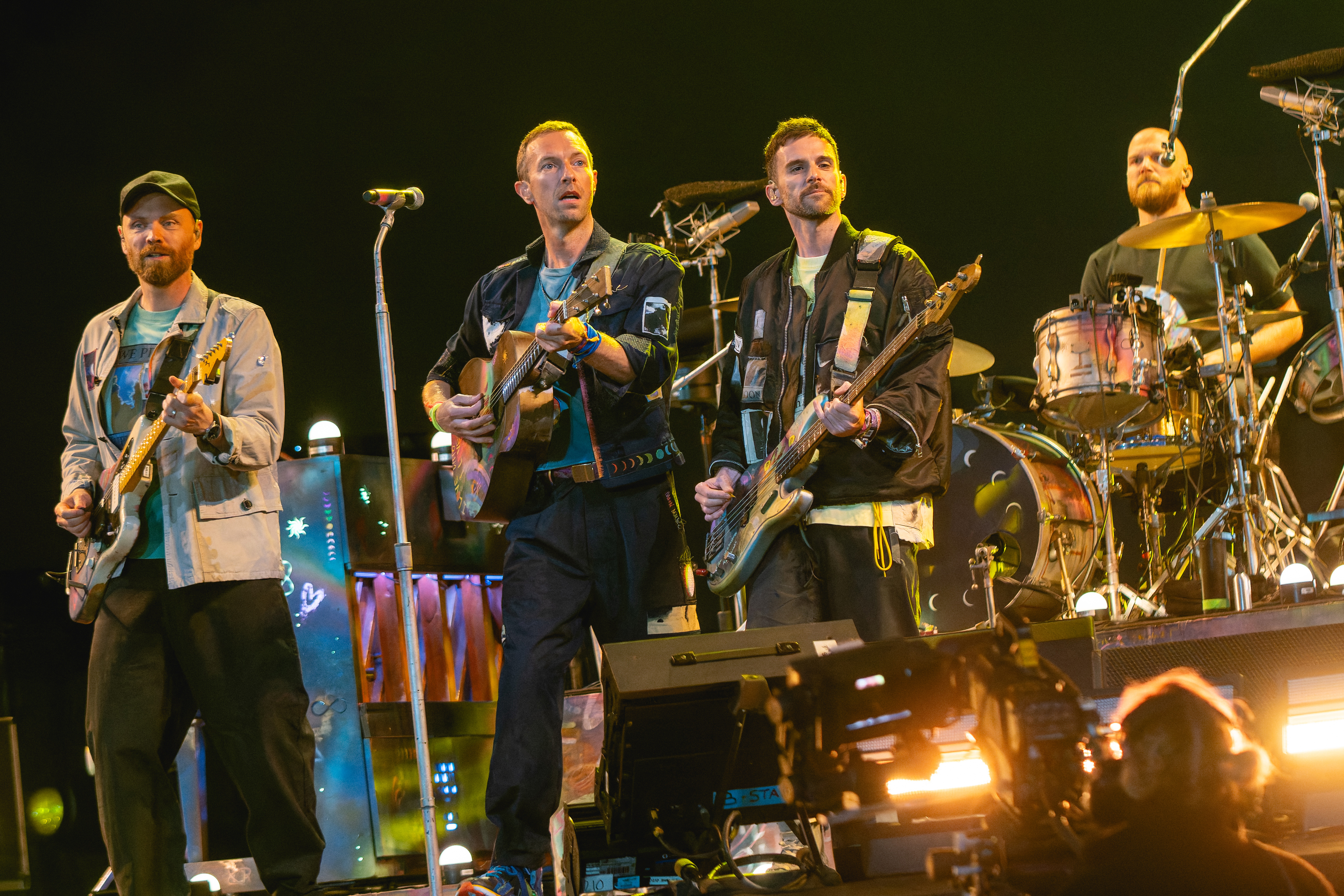
Coldplay performing at Glastonbury Festival 2024. It marked their record fifth time headlining the event.

On 13 June 2024, Coldplay announced "Feelslikeimfallinginlove" as the lead single for Moon Music. Details about the album were shared through their social media, being scheduled for release on 4 October. CD and vinyl pressings were crafted from recycled polycarbonate and PET-plastic bottles, respectively. Two weeks later, the band headlined Glastonbury Festival for the fifth time, extending the record set in June 2016. Guests included Victoria Canal, Michael J. Fox and Laura Mvula. They also revealed "We Pray", featuring Little Simz, Burna Boy, Elyanna and Tini. It was made available as the second single on 23 August. During their stay in Rome on the Music of the Spheres World Tour, the group premiered "Good Feelings", with Ayra Starr.

Moon Music reached number one in 16 countries, outselling the rest of the Top 40 combined in the United Kingdom. The album also topped the Billboard 200 in the United States, marking the first time a British group led both charts simultaneously since 2016. Its visual companion, named A Film for the Future, was released in January 2025. Coldplay held two shows at the Narendra Modi Stadium during the same month, earning the largest stadium attendance of the 21st century with more than 111,000 people each night.

== Artistry ==
=== Creative process ===
During an interview for NME, Berryman explained the band usually have a title and concept in mind before the music arrives, which serves to provide a "framework into which we can work thematically". Martin described their way of writing new songs as "a series of doors". He brings initial ideas to Buckland, and the guitarist either disapproves or gives his input; the same happens from Buckland to Berryman, and then to Champion, allowing all band members to express themselves artistically. However, this process is known to not always be linear, since tracks like "Magic" and "Adventure of a Lifetime" started through the bass and guitar riffs from Berryman and Buckland, respectively. Coldplay often switch instruments while in the studio as well. When questioned about avoiding explicit language in lyrics, Champion affirmed that swear words are "extremely useful at times", but found that overusing them can diminish their impact. Music critics suggest the band have a pattern, taking turns between "overt bids for mainstream success and more self-consciously artsy prestige pieces". Buckland stated that knowing the "big [album] is coming allows us to go a lot smaller" and be more "insular about what music we make sense".

=== Musical and lyrical style ===
Coldplay have explored many musical styles throughout their career, with their sound being considered alternative rock, alternative pop, pop rock, post-Britpop, soft rock and pop. After winning a Grammy Award for Best Rock Album in 2009, Martin jokingly stated in his acceptance speech that they were "limestone rock" in comparison to "hard rock". The extended plays released in 1998 and 1999 have characteristics of dream pop, setting them apart from future releases. Their first studio album, Parachutes (2000), was described as melodic pop which combined "bits of distorted guitar riffs and swishing percussion", being "exquisitely dark and artistically abrasive". Berryman called it a "quiet, polite record", while Champion has compared the lyrics to Lou Reed's "Perfect Day", as they are moody but with twists that imply optimism, ultimately making an album defined by the contrast between beautiful and happy messages and notoriously sad sounds.

On the other hand, 2002's A Rush of Blood to the Head is full of "plaintive strums, weary arpeggios and pained melodies", along with a sense of urgency and heartbreak. During an interview, Martin affirmed the title means "doing something on impulse". Music critics described it as larger, darker and colder than its predecessor, praising Coldplay for showing a newfound confidence as well. This style was kept for their third album, X&Y (2005), although now with the addition of electronic influences and extensive use of synthesisers, having a grander scale in terms of both sound and existential themes. Craig McLean from The Guardian called it "the work of an increasingly driven, punchier band", describing the melodies as "heartfelt stuff, with thumping guitar lines and emotive piano". Lyrics have been described as the ruminations on Martin's "doubts, fears, hopes, and loves", with words that "are earnest and vague, so listeners can identify with the underlying concepts in the songs".

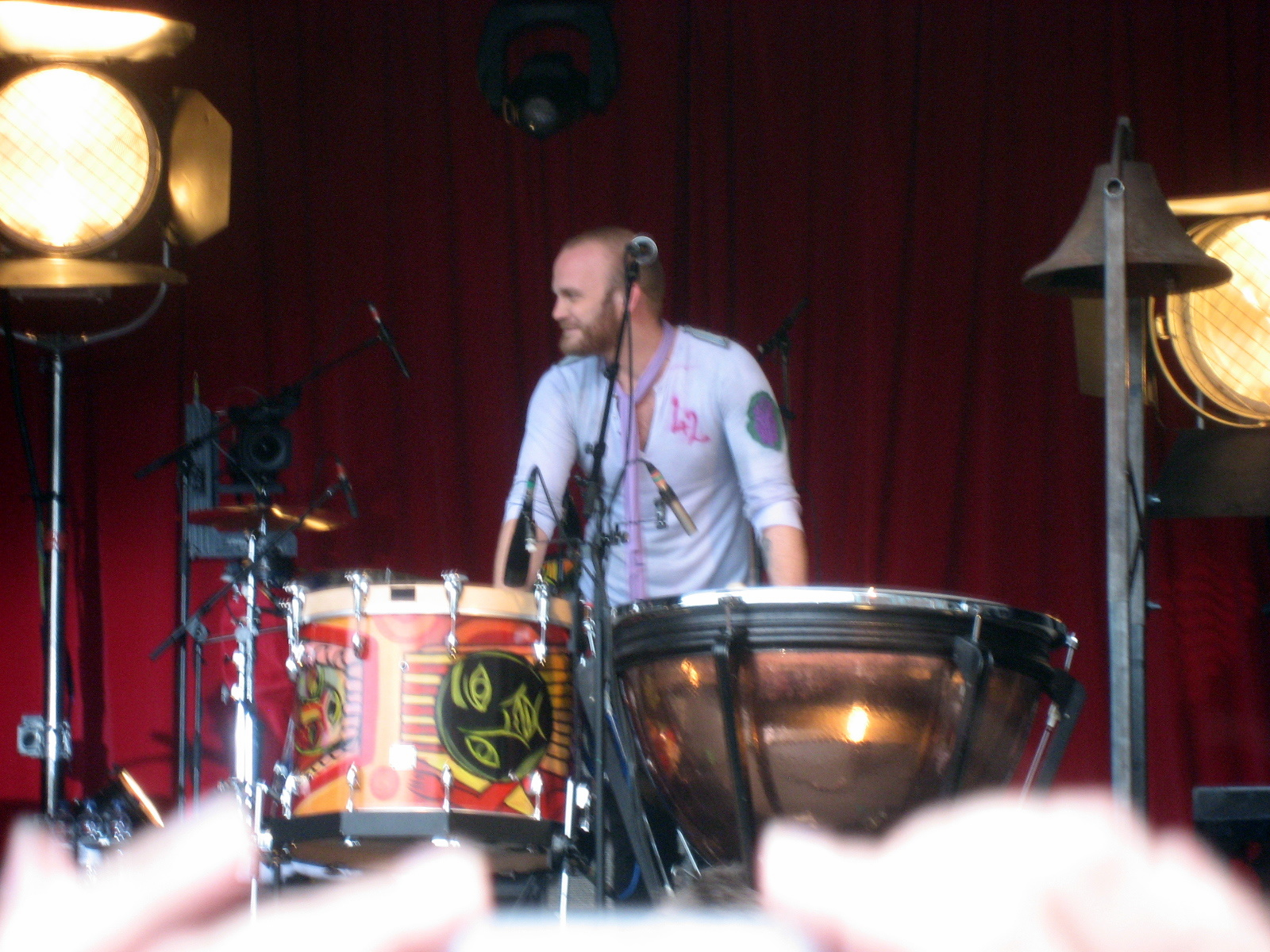
Champion with the timpani and church bell used in "Viva la Vida"

With Viva la Vida or Death and All His Friends and the subsequent Prospekt's March (both released in 2008), Coldplay further diversified their style and explored new territory following the completion of what they saw as a trilogy of albums. The band experimented with numerous different instruments, including church organs, tack pianos, santoors and orchestras, all while using more layered productions. They also tried distinct song structures and vocal identities at the suggestion of producer Brian Eno, drawing influences from Oriental, Hispanic, African and Middle Eastern sounds. The title track, "Viva la Vida", is considered baroque pop, and fourth single "Strawberry Swing" was described as having psychedelic inspirations. They dabbled in shoegaze on hidden track "Chinese Sleep Chant" as well. Lyrics are more universal in comparison to previous material, with the subject matter being more collective as the band "delves into love, life, war and death". Martin commented the revolution motifs were inspired by Victor Hugo's Les Misérables (1862).

Those themes, along with some of the oriental influences, remained in 2011's Mylo Xyloto, a concept album that follows the story of two characters in the style of a rock opera. It expanded the spectrum of Coldplay's sound by including more electronic elements than before and featuring mostly upbeat tones for the first time, resulting in a pop rock style with modern, urban and dance melodies. According to Champion, the band originally wanted to make an acoustic record, so when "Paradise" started to take shape, they decided to begin a separate electronic album. However, the two of them ultimately became a single body of work, with songs like "Charlie Brown" and "Us Against the World" getting reworked into their current versions. Berryman declared they approached the project with confidence. Lyrically, Martin said he was mostly inspired by old school American graffiti, the White Rose movement and "being able to speak out or follow your passion, even if everybody seems against it". In 2013, a comic book based on the record's plot was released in partnership with Mark Osborne.

For Ghost Stories (2014), Coldplay adopted a melancholic and somber style considered reminiscent of their debut, while incorporating electronica, R&B, synth-pop and ambient influences. Its melodies are also noticeably darker and more minimalistic than Mylo Xyloto, having sparse arrangements that reflect their desire to "keep a sense of space" without "being afraid of silence" or "layering too many sounds". The project is considered a break-up album as well, exploring lyrically how past events in one's life (their ghosts) affect the present. Martin called it a journey of learning about unconditional love after he divorced from Gwyneth Paltrow. A year later, A Head Full of Dreams was released with a similar style, but featuring bright and uplifting tones instead, making contrast with its predecessor while introducing elements of disco and funk, most notably in lead single "Adventure of a Lifetime". In the lyrics, they worked on subjects of unity, dreaming, parenthood, forgiveness, healing, and thankfulness.

In 2017, the band made Kaleidoscope EP available as a companion piece to the album. It included a live version of "Something Just Like This", their EDM collaboration with the Chainsmokers, and Brian Eno's returning production in "Aliens". Meanwhile, tracks such as "All I Can Think About Is You" and "Hypnotised" mixed Coldplay's newfound pop style with their alternative rock roots, setting the template for Everyday Life (2019) which saw a return to the experimentation and organic sounds of Viva la Vida or Death and All His Friends while having new influences from gospel, blues and classical music. Released as the lead single along with "Orphans", the song "Arabesque" drew from jazz fusion and afrobeat inspirations. The band continued their lyrical themes of positivity, equality, hope, legacy and humanity, but added loss, pain and commentaries on issues such as racism, police brutality, gun control and refugee crisis; it was also their first album to feature profanity.

This multi-style approach was similarly present in 2021's Music of the Spheres, although leaning towards pop sounds. According to Berryman, the record "was created with one eye on the live performances" and that "shaped the overall energy levels and song selections" for it. Martin added he was inspired by the Star Wars franchise, which made him wonder what other artists could be like across the universe after watching the Mos Eisley Cantina band perform. New musical influences included "Human Heart" (an a cappella collaboration with R&B duo We Are King and Jacob Collier) and "Coloratura" (a progressive rock ballad running at 10 minutes and 18 seconds, making it the longest song the band have ever released). The phrase "Everyone is an alien somewhere" was frequently used to promote the project; Champion stated it is meant to get people to look at what brings them together instead of what keeps them apart, since "from another planet's perspective, we would be the aliens".

=== Influences ===
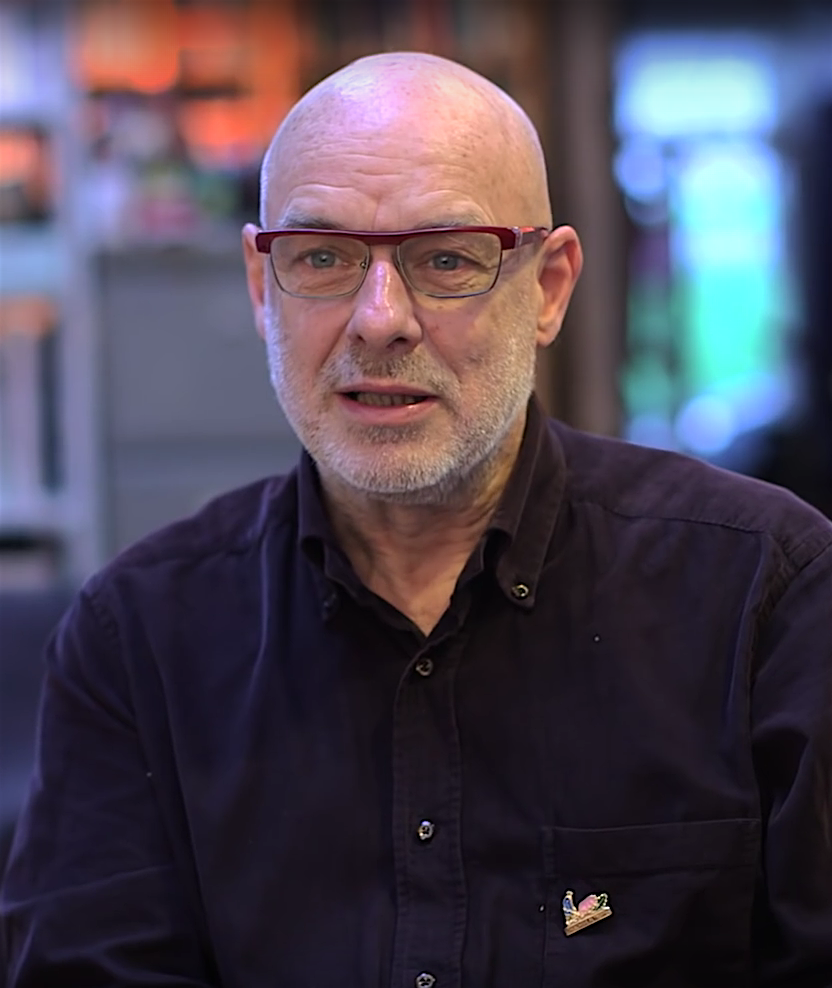
Brian Eno influenced Coldplay's ambient and electronica sound

Coldplay's music has been compared to a-ha, U2, Oasis, R.E.M. and Radiohead. They acknowledged Scottish band Travis and American singer Jeff Buckley as major influences on their early material as well, which was mostly produced by Ken Nelson. Martin is known to be a fan of Bruce Springsteen, mentioned "spending three years trying to sound like Eddie Vedder" before Buckley, and commented listening to many hymns when he was young due to his religious upbringing. In 2021, he cited Belgian singer-songwriter Stromae as another influence, affirming "He is one of our heroes you know, he is one of those people that comes along and completely inspires you all over again".

Buckland, on the other hand, stated the Stone Roses were one of the reasons why he learned to play guitar. In 2020, he shared on social media playlists with some of his favourite tracks and artists from each decade, including the Velvet Underground, Carole King, Joy Division, Talking Heads, Kate Bush, Donna Summer, Björk, Beastie Boys and many others. He said during an interview in the following year his favourite song of all time is "Teardrop" by Massive Attack. Meanwhile, Berryman is known to be inspired by artists like James Brown, Marvin Gaye, Kool & the Gang and the Funk Brothers. He added that his musical taste is difficult to condense, but he could not live without the Beatles or Motown. As for Champion, he commented that playing violin and piano since he was eight years old gave him a different perspective on drums, an instrument he only learned after joining the band. During his early years, he listened to Bob Dylan, Tom Waits, Nick Cave and traditional Irish folk music. He has named Ginger Baker, Dave Grohl and John Bonham among his favourite drummers.

For A Rush of Blood to the Head (2002), they drew inspiration from Echo & the Bunnymen, George Harrison and Muse. Their third album, X&Y (2005), was particularly influenced by Kraftwerk and Depeche Mode. The song "Til Kingdom Come" was first written as a collaboration with Johnny Cash before he died. Aside from Nelson, Coldplay also worked with Danton Supple during recording sessions. On Viva la Vida or Death and All His Friends (2008), the band moved towards art rock sensibilities, with inspirations including My Bloody Valentine, Blur and Arcade Fire. After partnering with Brian Eno and Jon Hopkins, they began to incorporate elements of ambient music and electronica into compositions. Both producers returned for Mylo Xyloto (2011), with Eno having a more direct role in the songwriting process.

In 2014, Paul Epworth contributed to Ghost Stories. Producers Tim Bergling and Madeon were involved as well which resulted in tracks like "A Sky Full of Stars" having a more "danceable flavor". Made available in the following year, A Head Full of Dreams (2015) featured producing duo Stargate. Long-time partners of the band include Davide Rossi, Bill Rakho, Rik Simpson and Dan Green. The last three are referred as The Dream Team on Everyday Life (2019) and all four have been working with Coldplay since Viva la Vida or Death and All His Friends. For their ninth album, Music of the Spheres (2021), the group invited Swedish producer Max Martin. The song "People of the Pride" has an introduction inspired by a Beyoncé performance at the Global Citizen Festival, while promotional single "Coloratura" drew comparisons to Pink Floyd.

=== Live performances ===
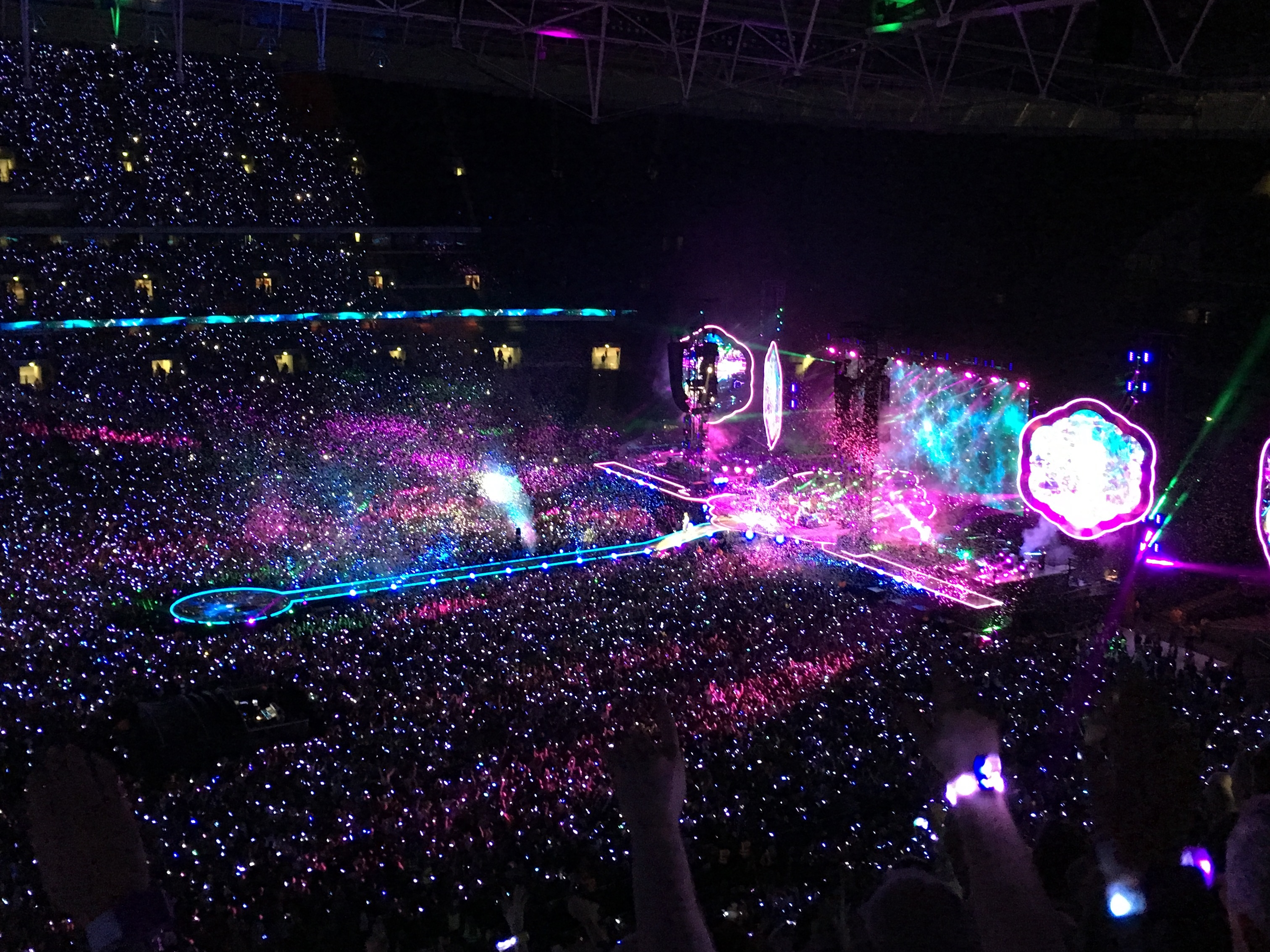
Coldplay at Wembley Stadium during the Head Full of Dreams Tour in 2016. The band also had an additional smaller stage where they performed an acoustic set.

Coldplay have been said to "make sure each tour is its own dazzling, light-up spectacular". Their concerts often use fireworks, lasers and confetti cannons. Furthermore, Pollstar stated they were the first artist to include LED wristbands in live performances. The group are widely credited with popularising the feature as well. Writing a review of Live in Buenos Aires (2018), Sam Sodomsky from Pitchfork hailed them as "one of the 21st century's most enduring live acts". Meanwhile, The Guardian's Alexis Petridis commented that the set lists used by the band were "a bullish reminder of how [they] got, and then stayed, huge". Both reviewers also noted how Martin usually interacts with the audience between each song's performance.

For Ghost Stories Tour (2014), however, Coldplay staged intimate sets at venues like Royal Albert Hall and the Beacon Theatre. The concerts made use of new features including a laser harp and the reactable. A similar approach was taken for Everyday Life (2019) over their environmental concerns, with the band playing small shows for charity and a special livestream at the Amman Citadel in Jordan. When reviewing these shows, Dan Stubbs from NME stated "on stage is where Coldplay come alive, and where they make the most sense". In 2022, Champion said the Flaming Lips were instrumental in shaping their idea of how entertaining a concert can be, as the American band's tours have "a sense of wonder and sense of fun which we really respond to".

=== Fashion and aesthetic ===
While members of the band dress casually in their personal lives, they have adopted multiple styles and visuals for each album's promotion. Jon O'Brien from the Recording Academy observed Coldplay's fashion sense did not "extend beyond the student staple of hoodies and corduroys" during initial years. Martin often wore Make Trade Fair shirts and had multiple versions of the institution's logo written on the back of his hand. In the marketing campaign for X&Y (2005), which featured a representation of the Baudot code on its artwork, the group wore black shirts, jackets, suits and pants, accompanied by white shoes. After being questioned about it, Martin said there was a "great security" in feeling part of a team. In 2007, they began to work with stylist Beth Fenton to make clothes fit the "universe" or the stories being told. They met her through Stella McCartney and Sara Jowett, who helped Coldplay to produce uniforms for Viva la Vida or Death and All His Friends (2008). Inspirations included the Beatles' Sgt. Pepper's Lonely Hearts Club Band (1967) and jackets worn by French Revolution armies. The piece Martin used at Wembley Stadium in 2009 was added to the V&A Museum permanent collection as well. During recording sessions for Mylo Xyloto (2011), the band drew influence from graffiti and designed instruments, cover artworks and stages with street artist Paris. Conversely, Mila Fürstová's melancholic etchings were adopted for Ghost Stories (2014). Non-customised outfits returned, but with darker tones.

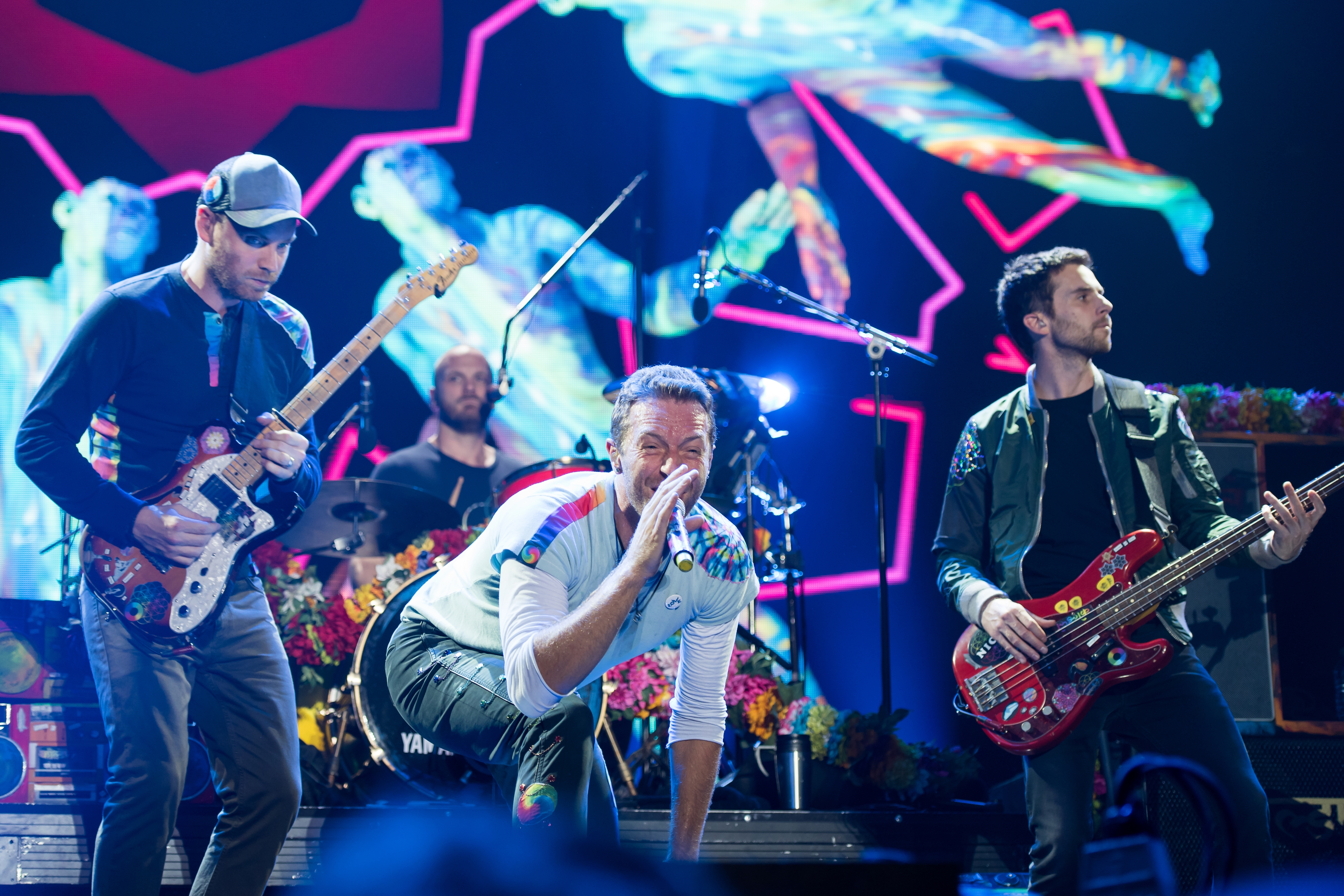
Coldplay's aesthetic for A Head Full of Dreams (2015) reflected the bright, uplifting sounds on the album

Around the same period, Martin started to wear buttons from Love Button Global Movement, which became his signature accessory. The organization is focused on transforming the world through individual and collaborative "acts of kindness". Clothes made for A Head Full of Dreams (2015) then included details based on tie-dye and kaleidoscope visuals reminiscent of the 1970s decade. Berryman's jacket and shirts worn by Buckland and Champion also had the flower of life as a reference to the album cover, while Martin drew media attention for using custom-made Air Jordans. Additionally, instruments were decorated with stickers, some of which featured the names of the band's children. In 2016, Fenton stated Coldplay's pieces are typically sourced from Rag & Bone and Levi's. Three years later, a photograph of Buckland's great-grandfather inspired the old-fashioned aesthetic of Everyday Life (2019), characterised as "a sepia-tinged 1919 jazz band". Nods to the Arab world were prominently made as well. To promote Music of the Spheres (2021), they added a space motif to all items and photoshoots. Wardrobe items were sourced by Applied Art Forms, the fashion brand Berryman established in the previous year. Each member chose the basic pieces by themselves, modifying them with embroidery or patches.

== Achievements ==
Coldplay are considered the most successful band of the 21st century. With over 170 million records worldwide, they are one of the best-selling artists of all time. Parachutes (2000), A Rush of Blood to the Head (2002) and X&Y (2005) have all been listed among the 50 best-selling albums in the United Kingdom, marking the most appearances by a group in the ranking. The latter was also the third-fastest-selling album in the country's history upon release. In 2008, "Viva la Vida" became the first song by a British act to top the UK Singles Chart and Billboard Hot 100 simultaneously since Rod Stewart's "Maggie May" (1971). Its namesake album earned the largest digital sales of the 2000s in the United States. In 2013, Coldplay were ranked as the most influential British celebrities in the world on Forbes Celebrity 100. They became the first band to surpass a billion streams on Spotify the following year. Their performance at the Super Bowl 50 halftime show registered the highest audience ever among groups, helping to make them the most googled band of 2016. During the same year, Coldplay headlined Glastonbury Festival for the fourth time, a record for any musician. (Note: The achievement was extended to five headline performances in 2024.) In 2021, "My Universe" became the first song by a British group to debut atop Billboard Hot 100. They have earned $2.48 billion from touring. Both the Head Full of Dreams (2016–2017) and Music of the Spheres (2022–2025) tours rank among the highest-grossing runs of all time, with the latter also being the most-attended. In 2024, Coldplay were named the most played group of the 21st century across British media. They became the first to surpass 100 million monthly listeners on Spotify the following year.

The band have received numerous accolades throughout their career as well, becoming the most awarded and nominated group of all time at the Brit Awards (nine victories from 32 nominations). They are the first act to ever win British Album of the Year three times and British Group four times, scoring the most nominations for both categories. Coldplay have also won seven Grammy Awards from 39 nominations, receiving Song of the Year and Record of the Year once, while being nominated for the Album of the Year category three times. In January 2009, they received a NRJ Award of Honour in recognition of their career accomplishments and impact. The band were then named Songwriters of the Year at the ASCAP London Music Awards in the following year, having previously received the same honor from the Ivor Novello Awards in 2003. Their single "Atlas", which was released as part of The Hunger Games: Catching Fire (2013) soundtrack, was nominated for the 19th Critics' Choice Awards and shortlisted at the 87th Academy Awards. In 2014, Coldplay were ranked as the sixth-most-awarded group of all time by Fuse. Two years later, the band were chosen for NME Awards' Godlike Genius Award, which honours "careers of music icons who have been pioneers in the industry". They have earned two American Music Awards; nine Billboard Music Awards; eight MTV Video Music Awards; three Juno Awards and two silver prizes at the Cannes Lions International Festival of Creativity. They have also established 16 Guinness World Records, holding 10 of them. In May 2022, it was reported that the band's estimated combined wealth—without Harvey—exceeded £471 million, placing them among the richest musicians on the planet.

== Legacy ==
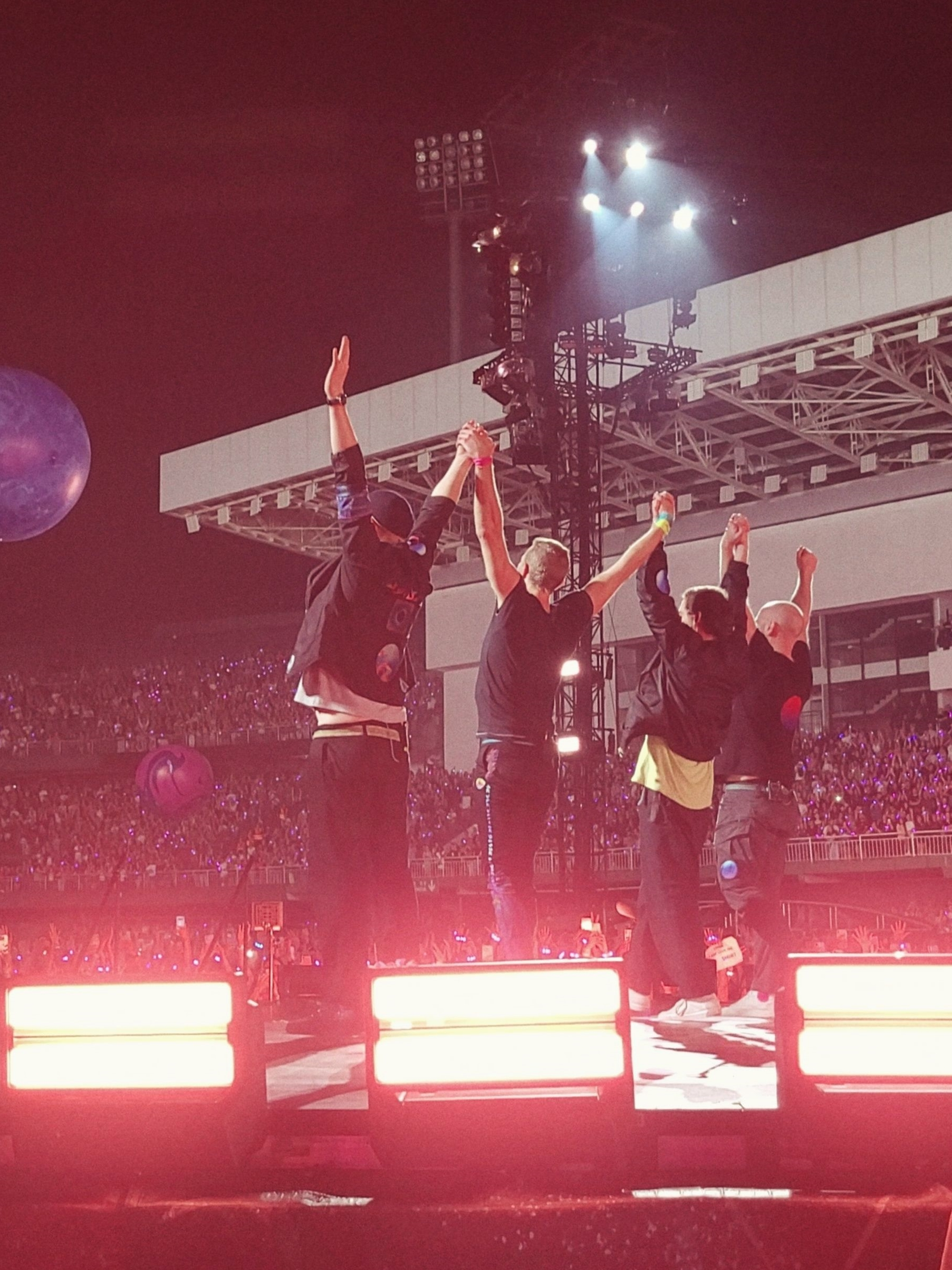
Coldplay at Estádio Couto Pereira, Curitiba in 2023

Coldplay are considered one of the most influential bands of the 21st century. Writing for Firstpost, Lakshmi Govindrajan Javeri commented they have "mastered the art of reinvention", consequently widening the "roster of artists inspired by them" and creating "a rich multi-genre legacy" which impacted a variety of mainstream and indie musicians worldwide. Songs from the group have been covered and sampled on many occasions as well. They were credited with bringing the sound of mainstream rock towards "something more gentle and melodic" and ushering into new forms of songwriting when "British music struggled to define itself". Neil McCormick from The Telegraph stated that the band represent the evolution of rock into a brand new era, while Afisha's Sergey Stepanov described them as the 21st century equivalent to the Beatles. Publications have also frequently labelled Coldplay as successors to U2 as the biggest band in the world. (Note: As per The Guardian, The New York Times, Stereogum, and The Telegraph.)

Despite their popularity and impact, the group earned a reputation as polarising cultural icons, since they have attracted criticism as much as praise from the public and the music critics throughout their career. Michael Baumann explained for The Ringer that Coldplay's rise to fame coincided with a decade marked by "artistic snark and cynicism: hipsterism, the peak of pop punk" and the new rebirth of rockism, meaning that their "earnest, nonthreatening, and profoundly accessible" public image was established at "the worst time of the past 40 years to be those things". In a piece for The New York Times, Jon Pareles named them "the most insufferable band of the decade". Conversely, Lanre Bakare told El País that Martin is new kind of pop star who connects with fans emotionally. In 2022, The Times' Mark Beaumont defended that Coldplay regained respect and credibility in all fields by dedicating themselves to stadium spectacles.

Felipe Branco Cruz from Veja credited them with reinventing the concept of arena rock by turning fans into protagonists of the concert instead of mere spectators, which included making the use of LED wristbands on live performances widespread. The Music of the Spheres World Tour (2022–2025) has solidified the group as pioneers for sustainability in live entertainment, reducing CO_{2} emissions by 59% in comparison to their previous concert run. They were listed as one of the most influential climate action leaders in the world by Time as well. The British Phonographic Industry (BPI) has attributed rises in British music exportation to Coldplay's international success on several occasions. The band were also praised for having creative and "forward-thinking" marketing strategies, with their use of the internet as a tool for promotion being considered revolutionary in the early 21st century. In 2016, Q ranked their first five albums among the best of the last 30 years. The second, A Rush of Blood to the Head (2002), was added to the Rock and Roll Hall of Fame and Rolling Stone's definitive editorials. As another result of their impact and legacy, the group have spawned various tribute albums, events and acts.

== Other activities ==
=== Philanthropy ===
Coldplay donate 10% from all of their profits to charity. The fund is held in a bank account none of the band members can access. They have endorsed over 30 organisations over the years, including Amnesty International, Migrant Offshore Aid Station and Global Citizen Festival. In 2003, an acoustic cover of the song "2000 Miles" was issued to raise funds for Stop Handgun Violence and Future Forests. Two years later, they partnered with the Make Poverty History movement and were featured in one of their television campaigns. Coldplay have also auctioned significant memorabilia for Kids Company in 2009, including Martin's first guitar, the globe from the Parachutes (2000) album cover and their Viva la Vida Tour (2008–2010) wardrobe. They additionally became patrons for ClientEarth.

The Ocean Cleanup's Neon Moon I interceptor was sponsored by Coldplay and deployed on the Klang River

The band performed a modified version of "A Message" (named "A Message 2010") at Hope for Haiti Now, a telethon which raised money for the victims of the 2010 Haiti earthquake. Berryman mentioned that "You can make people aware of issues. It isn't very much effort for us at all, if it can help people, then we want to do it". In 2012, Album Artists staged an exhibition with artworks from Mylo Xyloto (2011) era to raise £610,000 for Kids Company. Two years later, Martin joined Band Aid for a second time and provided vocals to a new version of "Do They Know It's Christmas?", which focused on aiding the Ebola crisis.

In 2017, Coldplay made a donation of undisclosed value to the Centre for Cancer Immunology at University of Southampton, the first and only centre dedicated to cancer immunology research in the United Kingdom. The organisation reunited cancer scientists worldwide to enable the development of clinical trials and lifesaving drugs. In the following year, the band contributed to the Plastic Oceans Album from Artists' Project Earth, which was released on 20 February at London's Ocean Plastics Crisis Summit to raise awareness and funds to counter plastic pollution. Still in 2018, they made Global Citizen – EP 1 available under the pseudonym Los Unidades, with royalties being directed to the institution's endeavours of education and advocacy towards the end of extreme poverty.

In 2020, the music video of "Trouble in Town" was inspired by George Orwell's Animal Farm (1944) and had all of its proceeds from streaming and publishing donated to Innocence Project and the African Children's Feeding Scheme. Coldplay pledged support to the Ocean Cleanup as well, sponsoring two watercraft that collect plastic from polluted rivers in Malaysia. According to The Times, the band donated more than £2.1 million to environmental causes through their J Van Mars Foundation in 2021. As part of their efforts to make touring sustainable, they collaborated with One Tree Planted to fund a tree per ticket at the Music of the Spheres World Tour. Following their first Indonesia concert in 2023, Coldplay announced the renewal of their Ocean Cleanup alliance, with a new watercraft being deployed in Jakarta. In 2024, it was revealed that 10% of the proceeds from their Wembley Stadium and Craven Park performances would be donated to Music Venue Trust next year, helping grassroots venues and artists in the United Kingdom.

=== Politics and activism ===
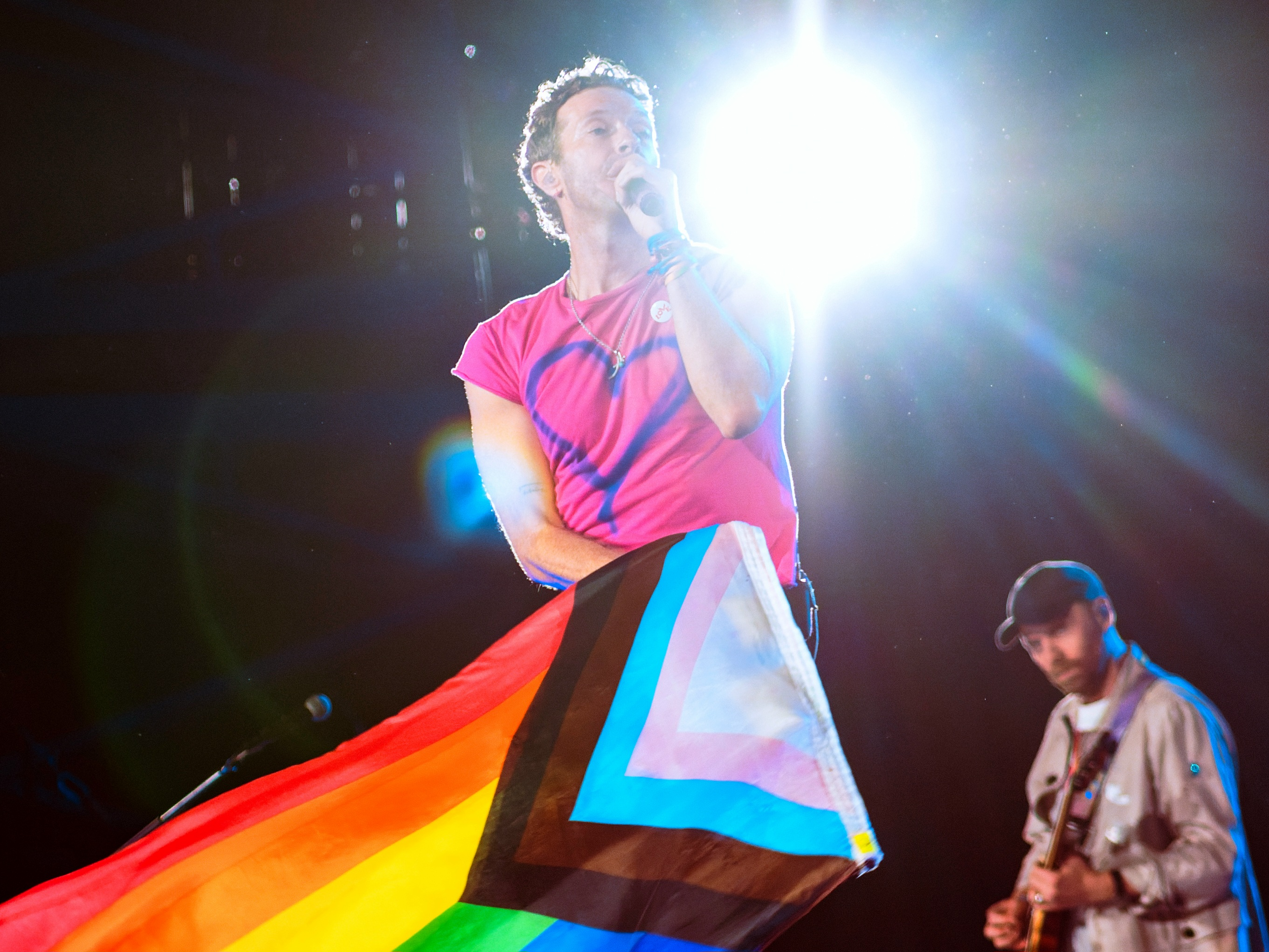
Martin performing "People of the Pride" with the rainbow flag

The band have been vocal about fair trade, collecting more than 70,000 signatures for Oxfam's Make Trade Fair initiative across the Rush of Blood to the Head (2002–2003) and Twisted Logic (2005–2007) tours. In 2003, Martin condemned the invasion of Iraq during a concert for Teenage Cancer Trust at the Royal Albert Hall, encouraging attendees to sing against war. He also endorsed Democratic presidential candidate John Kerry while accepting honours at the 46th Annual Grammy Awards. His wardrobe for the Viva la Vida Tour (2008–2010) included Barack Obama armbands. Coldplay pledged support to Meat Free Mondays as well. Paul McCartney established the campaign hoping to slow down climate change by having at least one meatless day per week.

In 2011, the group promoted the song "Freedom for Palestine" on Facebook, though their publication was removed afterwards without further explanation. Frank Barat of OneWorld clarified that moderators blocked it after users reported them for abusive content. Coldplay also refused to arrange concerts in Israel. Between 2019 and 2024, they collaborated with Palestinian musicians such as Le Trio Joubran and Elyanna. Martin stated that "We don't believe in oppression, occupation, terrorism or genocide". In 2022, the band backed the Mahsa Amini protests in Iran and covered "Baraye" at Estadio River Plate.

Coldplay endorsed the LGBTQ community as well, sparking controversy with their Super Bowl 50 halftime show. Many conservatives accused them of promoting a gay agenda when rainbow placards were flipped to form the sentence "Believe in love". The Advocate ranked the effort among the greatest queer moments of the event. In 2021, they signed a public letter championing the Equality Act. Members of the Malaysian Islamic Party tried to cancel a performance at Bukit Jalil National Stadium because Martin waves the rainbow flag every night. On national politics, Coldplay voted Remain at the 2016 United Kingdom European Union membership referendum. The band played at One Love Manchester in the following year, helping raise funds for the Manchester Arena bombing victims. In 2025, they opposed the unrestricted use of artificial intelligence across Britain and pushed authorities to combat ticket touting. Songs like "Trouble in Town" and "Guns" denounce racism, police brutality and armed violence.

=== Endorsements ===
Despite their worldwide popularity, Coldplay have remained notoriously protective of how their material appears in media. The band allow songs to be used in television shows and movies regularly, but most commercials are forbidden. In 2002, NME reported they turned down over $85 million in contracts from companies including Gatorade, Diet Coke and Gap. Martin stated "We would not be able to live with ourselves if we sold the songs' meanings like that". The first time one of their songs were used for advertisements was with "Viva la Vida" in 2008, the group signed a deal with Apple to promote the exclusive availability of the single on iTunes Store. In 2010, Martin appeared at the company's annual special event. Following the death of Steve Jobs, Coldplay performed on his memorial service at the Apple Campus, posthumously thanking his support.

Target commercial where Coldplay promoted Ghost Stories (2014)

Six years later, they took part in a Target commercial which promoted the exclusive deluxe edition of Ghost Stories (2014). Meanwhile, the music video for "Adventure of a Lifetime", which was directed by Mat Whitecross and recorded at the Imaginarium, had a Beats product placement. The company was allowed to use some parts of the video on their commercials as a return for covering the budget. In 2018, filmmaker Jon M. Chu revealed he sent a letter directly to the band laying out all his reasons in order to get permission for using "Yellow" in Crazy Rich Asians. After it was granted, a Chinese-language cover was commissioned.

In 2021, Coldplay announced a major partnership with German multinational BMW as part of their efforts to make touring as sustainable as possible. They commented the company's technology, which includes the first recyclable car batteries in the world, is able to power live performances almost entirely from renewable energy. As part of the deal, the band contributed on the marketing of two electric cars from the company and licensed "Higher Power" for advertisements. In 2022, Coldplay partnered with DHL to reduce the logistic impact of the Music of the Spheres World Tour, which included the use of electric vehicles and biofuel whenever possible.

== Band members ==
- Chris Martin – lead vocals, piano, keyboards, guitars (1997–present)
- Jonny Buckland – guitars, keyboards, backing vocals (1997–present)
- Guy Berryman – bass guitar, keyboards, backing vocals (1997–present)
- Will Champion – drums, percussion, piano, backing vocals (1998–present)
- Phil Harvey – manager (1998–2002; 2022–present), creative director (2006–present)

== Discography ==
- Parachutes (2000)
- A Rush of Blood to the Head (2002)
- X&Y (2005)
- Viva la Vida or Death and All His Friends (2008)
- Mylo Xyloto (2011)
- Ghost Stories (2014)
- A Head Full of Dreams (2015)
- Everyday Life (2019)
- Music of the Spheres (2021)
- Moon Music (2024)

== Filmography ==
- How We Saw the World – Live in Toronto (2006)
- A Head Full of Dreams (2018)
- Everyday Life – Live in Jordan (2019)
- Reimagined (2020)
- Music of the Spheres: Live at River Plate (2023)
- Tutto Passa – A Tribute to Napoli (2024)
- A Film for the Future (2025)

== Tours ==
- Parachutes Tour (2000–2001)
- A Rush of Blood to the Head Tour (2002–2003)
- Twisted Logic Tour (2005–2007)
- Viva la Vida Tour (2008–2010)
- Mylo Xyloto Tour (2011–2012)
- Ghost Stories Tour (2014)
- A Head Full of Dreams Tour (2016–2017)
- Music of the Spheres World Tour (2022–2025)

== See also ==
- List of people associated with University College London
- List of British Grammy winners and nominees
- List of best-selling music artists
- List of highest-grossing live music artists
- List of artists who reached number one on the UK Singles Chart
