= Coldplay videography =

Videos and media by British band

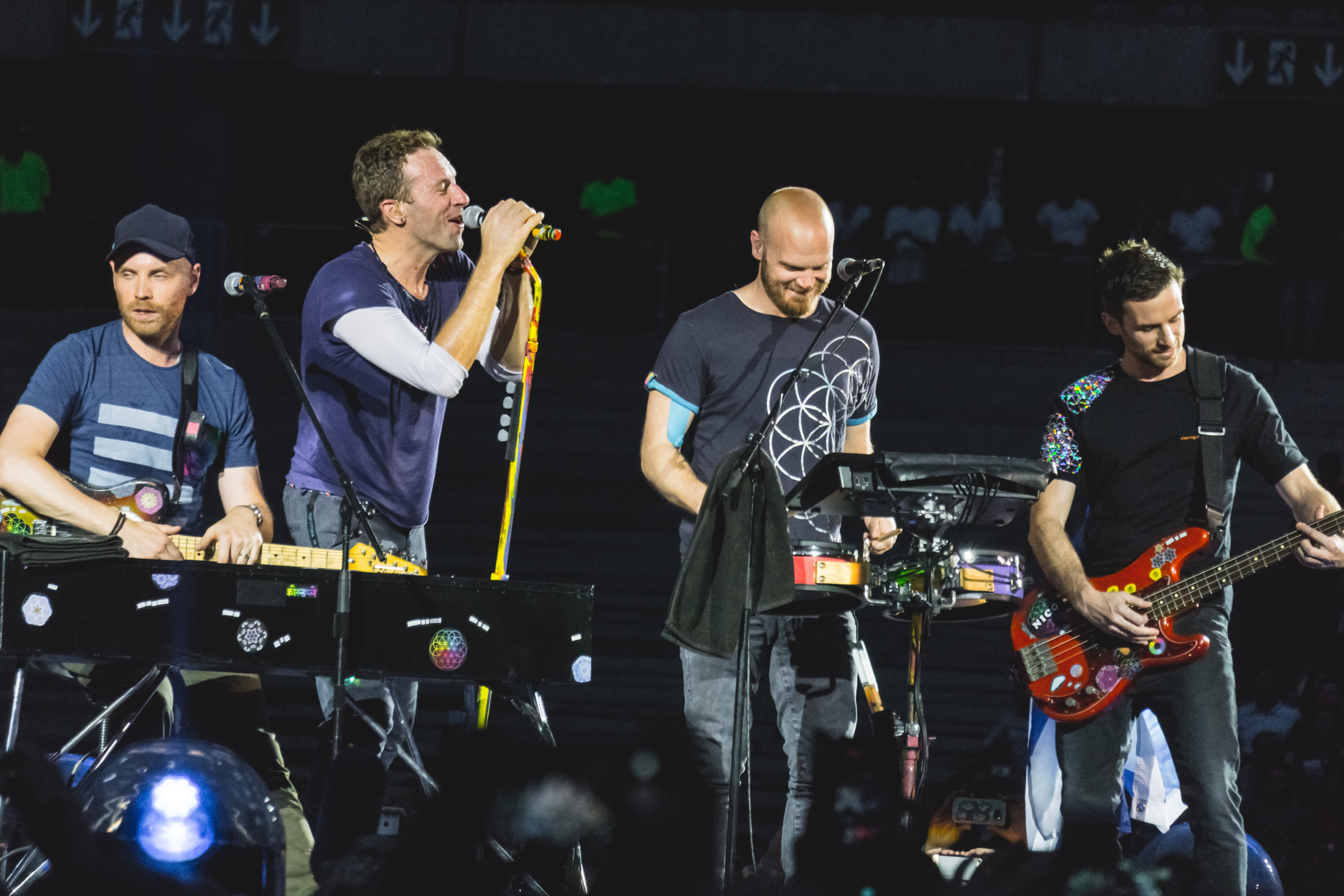
Coldplay at Stade de France in 2017

British rock band Coldplay have released 76 music videos, (Note: Including alternative versions officially published by the band or their collaborators.) 5 video albums and 6 films, (Note: Not counting Spike Island and Ashes (both from 2012), which were directed by Mat Whitecross and executively produced by the band.) appearing in a wide range of television shows throughout their career as well. They were formed in London by Chris Martin (vocals, piano), Jonny Buckland (lead guitar), Guy Berryman (bass guitar), Will Champion (drums, percussion) and Phil Harvey (management). Before their recording contract with Parlophone in 1999, a music video for "Bigger Stronger" was shot and directed by Mat Whitecross, who ultimately became one of the long-time collaborators of the band. It was followed by the singles "Shiver", "Yellow", "Trouble" and "Don't Panic" from Parachutes (2000), with the third earning a MTV Video Music Award for Best Art Direction.

To promote A Rush of Blood to the Head (2002), Coldplay made "In My Place" and "The Scientist" available. The latter won three MTV Video Music Awards and ran for Best Short Form Music Video at the 46th Annual Grammy Awards. Publicity affairs were completed in the following year with "Clocks", "God Put a Smile upon Your Face" and Live 2003, their first video album. Released in 2005, X&Y spawned "Speed of Sound", "Fix You", "Talk" and "The Hardest Part". They were succeeded by "Violet Hill", which came out in anticipation for Viva la Vida or Death and All His Friends (2008).

The band later shot two different versions of "Viva la Vida", one where they are performing the track and the other referencing Depeche Mode's "Enjoy the Silence". Additional music videos encompassed "Lovers in Japan", "Lost!", "Life in Technicolor II" and "Strawberry Swing", which received three UK Music Video Awards. In 2010, Coldplay launched "Christmas Lights" as a holiday single, while the subsequent year saw Whitecross directing "Every Teardrop Is a Waterfall", "Paradise" and "Charlie Brown" for Mylo Xyloto (2011). The record featured "Princess of China" and "Hurts Like Heaven" as well, having its promotion concluded by Live 2012. Two years later, Ghost Stories (2014) was made available with five music videos: "Midnight", "Magic", "A Sky Full of Stars", "True Love" and "Ink". The marketing campaign wrapped in November with its namesake live album.

In 2015, Coldplay released "Adventure of a Lifetime" as the lead single for A Head Full of Dreams, following it with the visuals for "Birds", "Hymn for the Weekend", "Up&Up", "A Head Full of Dreams" and "Everglow" over the succeeding year. Moreover, the band got two D&AD Awards and two silver prizes at the Cannes Lions International Festival of Creativity for the third. They later launched The Butterfly Package (2018), a set containing their fifth live (Live in Buenos Aires) and video (Live in São Paulo) albums plus a documentary directed by Whitecross. Everyday Life (2019) brought six music videos, including "Orphans", "Daddy", "Everyday Life" and "Champion of the World". Coldplay performed the full album at the Amman Citadel and transmitted the concert on YouTube as well. Between 2021 and 2022, Dave Meyers directed "Higher Power", "My Universe" and "Let Somebody Go" for Music of the Spheres, which later received three more clips and a film. "Feelslikeimfallinginlove", "We Pray", "The Karate Kid" and "All My Love" supported Moon Music (2024).

== Music videos ==
Key
†	Indicates a music video with multiple versions

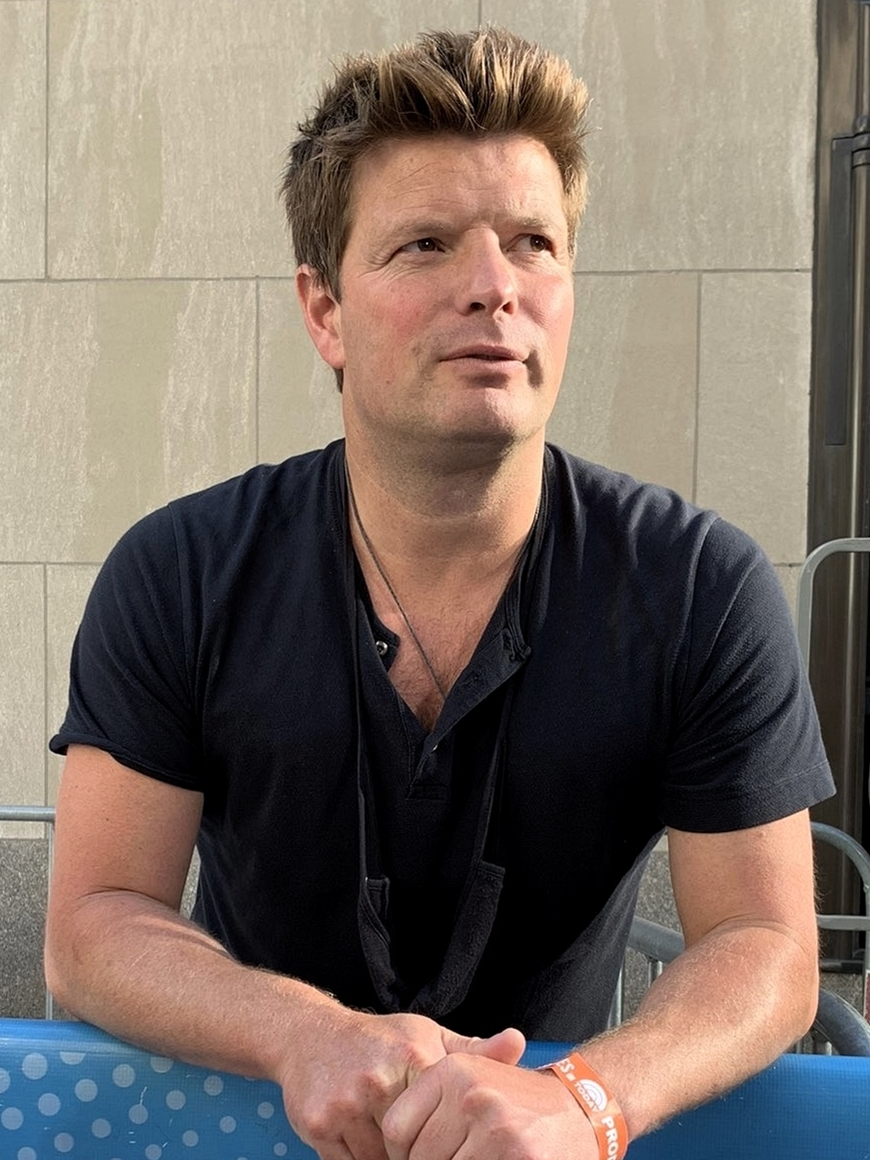
Phil Harvey (pictured in 2021) guested on numerous music videos as an easter egg.

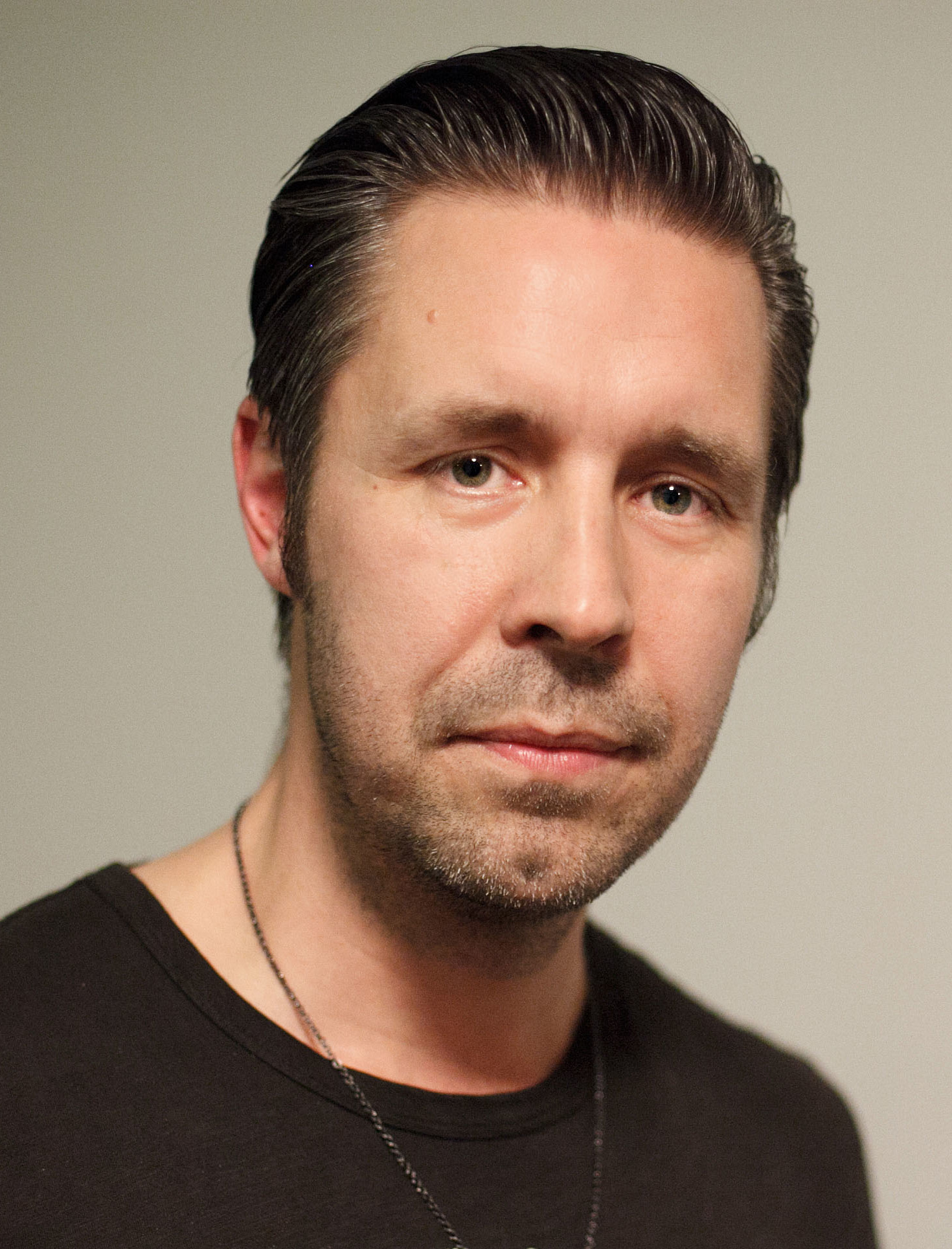
Paddy Considine (pictured in 2011) was the man slowly fading away in "God Put a Smile upon Your Face".

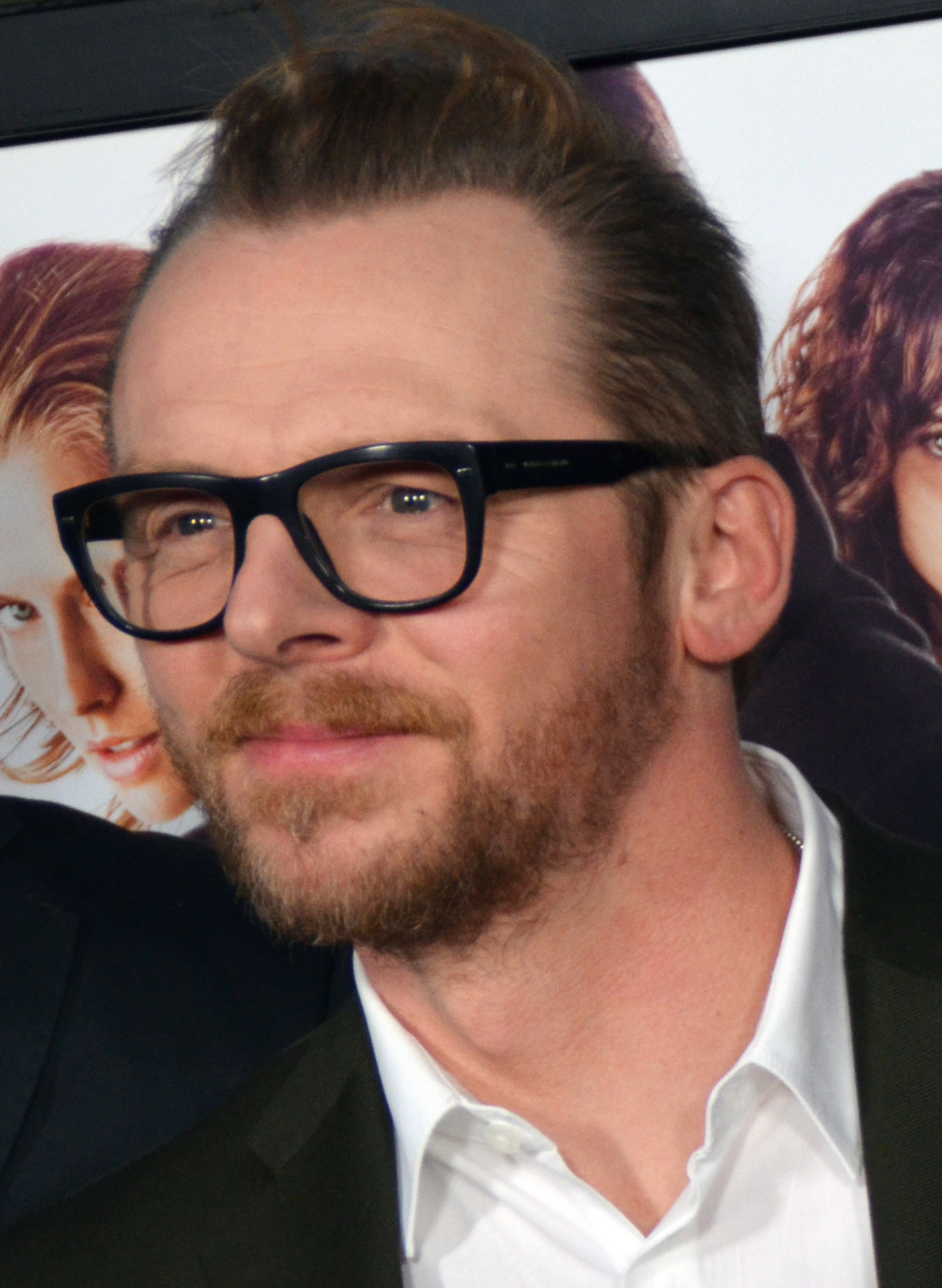
Simon Pegg (pictured in 2015) appeared as one of the Elvises playing the violin in "Christmas Lights".

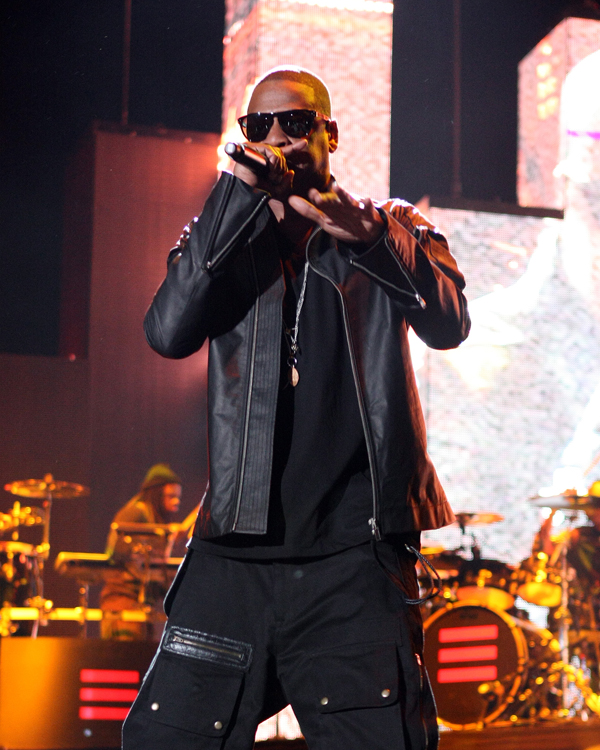
Jay-Z (pictured in 2010) was a guest in the music video for "Lost+", a remix of "Lost!".

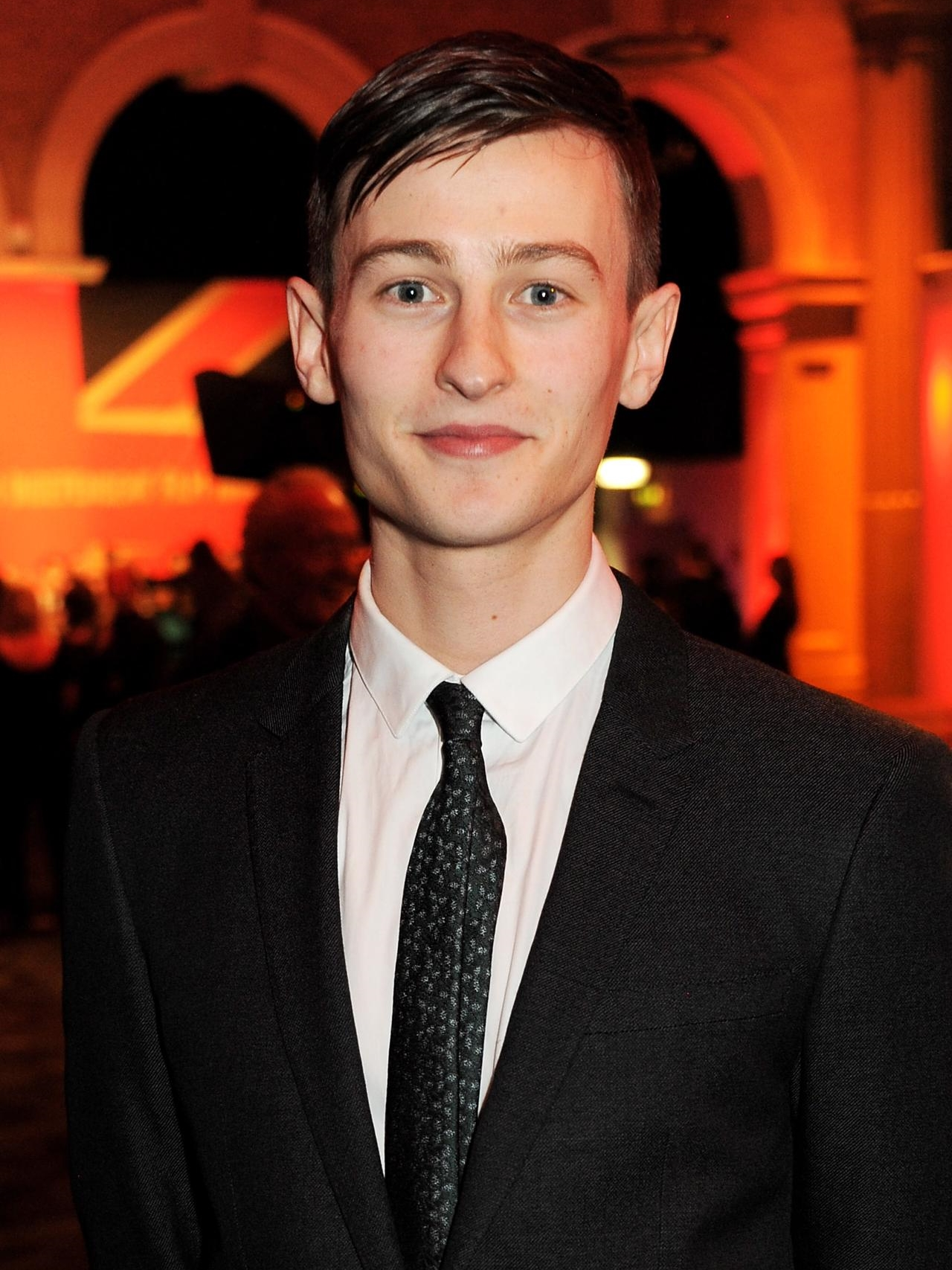
Elliott Tittensor (pictured in 2015) played a young man going to a party with Antonia Thomas in "Charlie Brown"

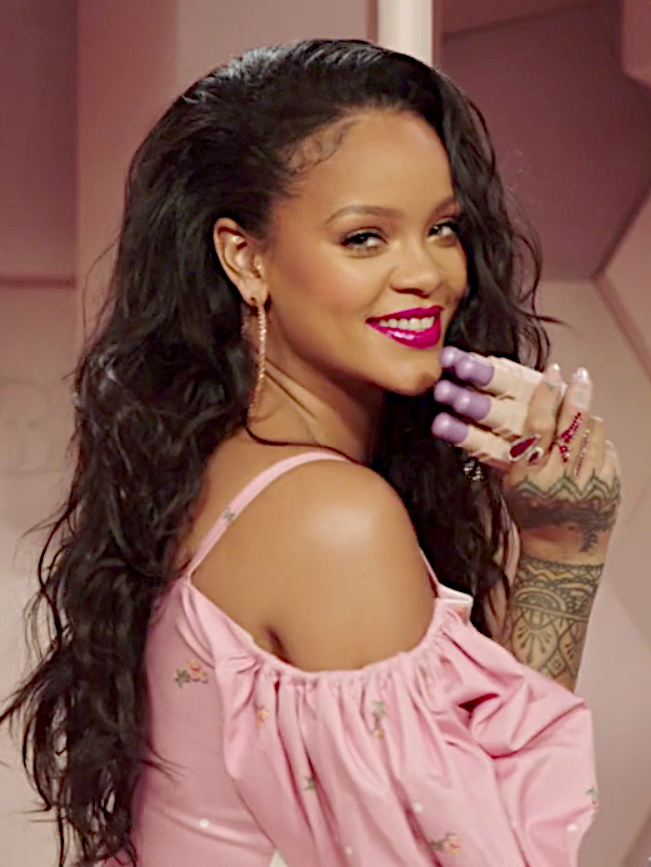
Rihanna (pictured in 2018) was featured as Martin's lover in "Princess of China".

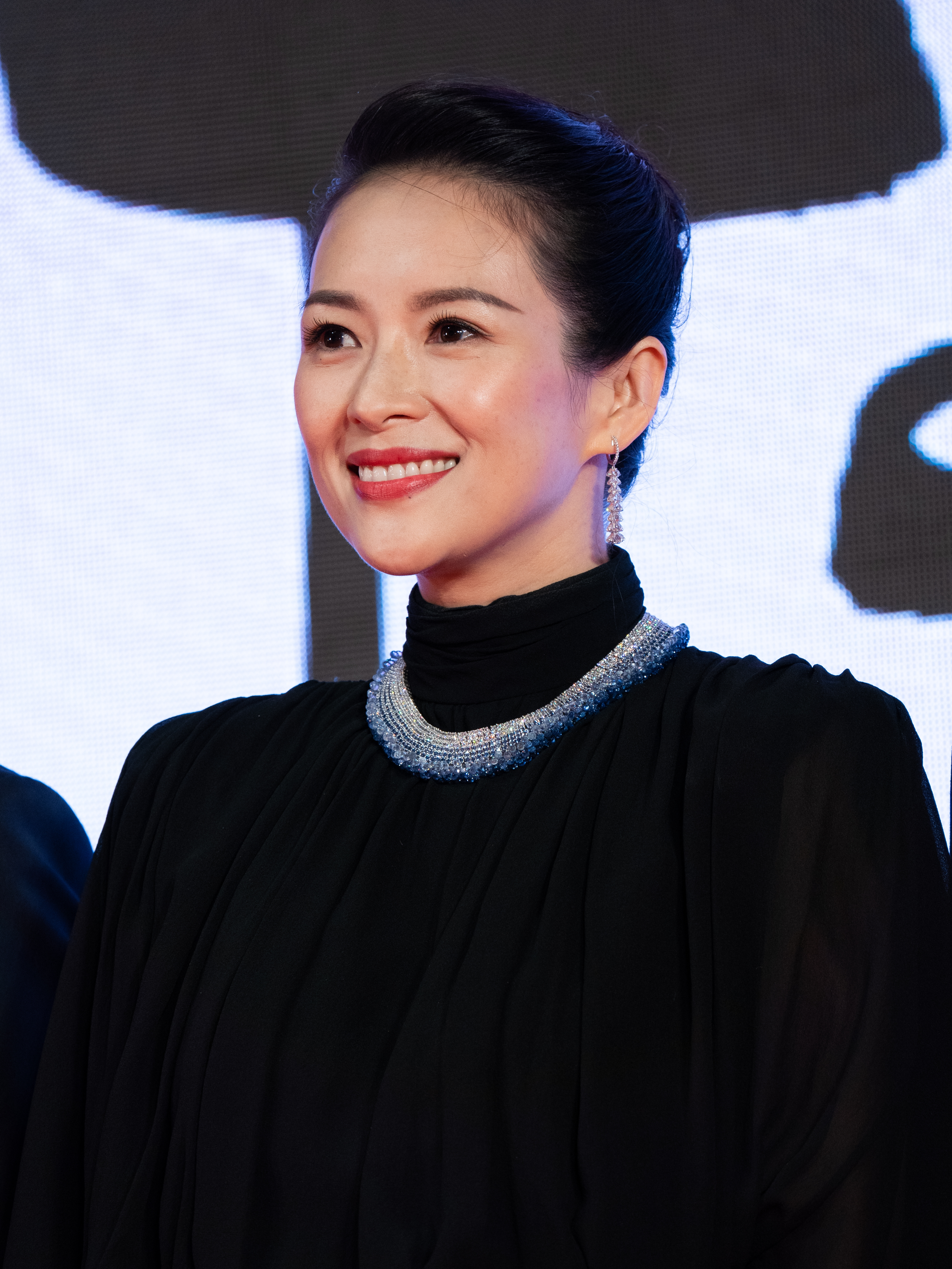
Zhang Ziyi (pictured in 2019) played a stage magician named Cecile for "Magic"

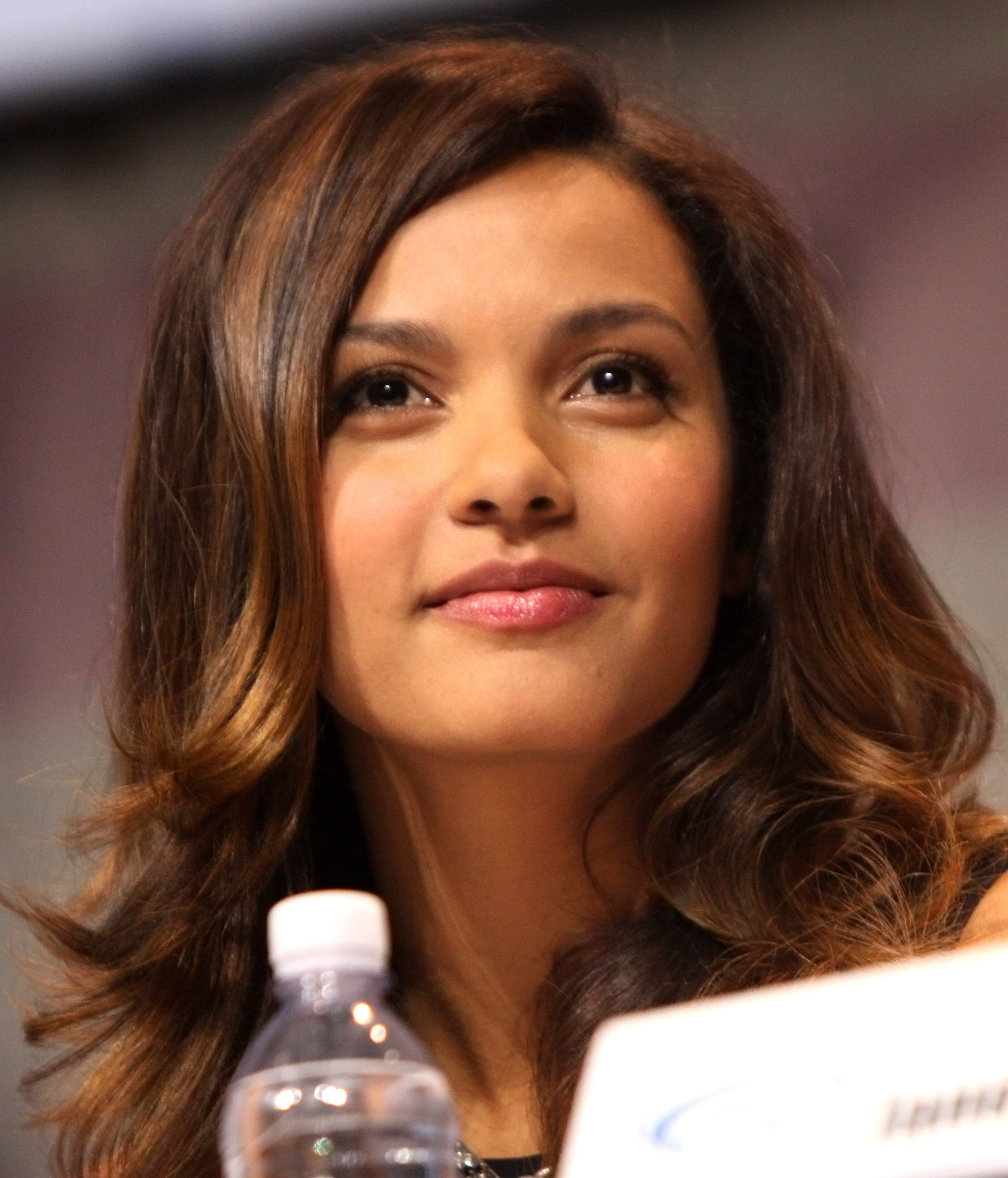
Jessica Lucas (pictured in 2013) starred as Martin's love interest in "True Love".

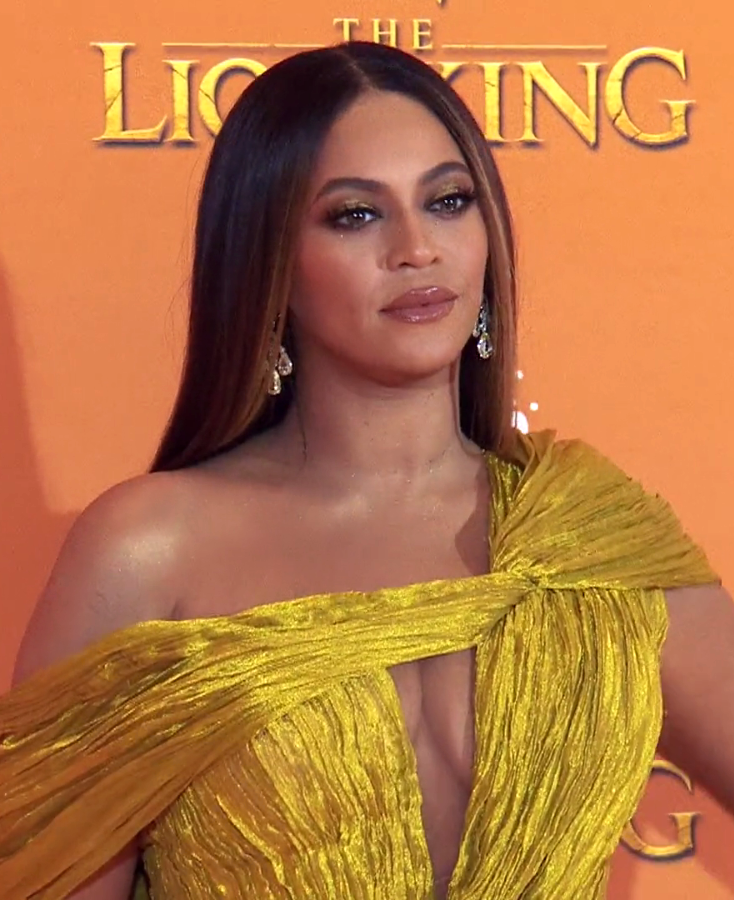
Beyoncé (pictured in 2019) was featured in the music video for "Hymn for the Weekend".

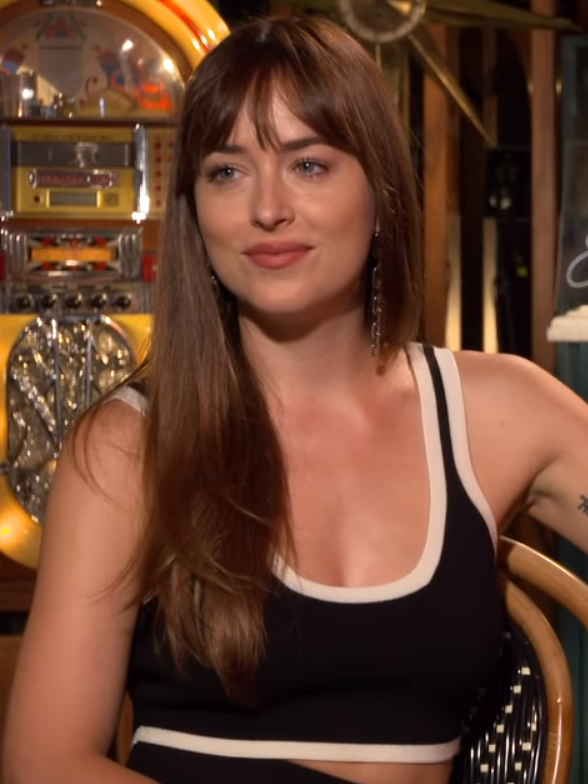
Dakota Johnson (pictured in 2018) made her directorial debut with "Cry Cry Cry".

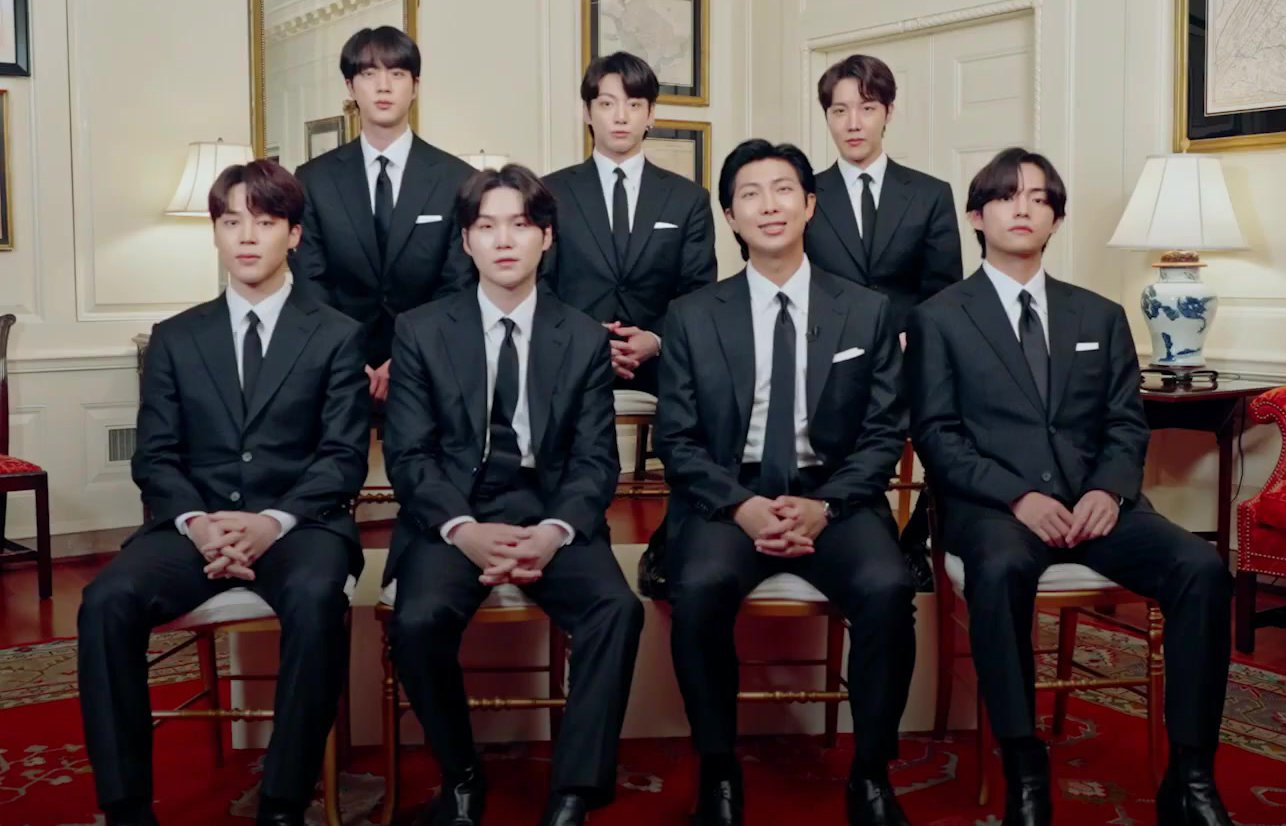
BTS (pictured in 2022) were one of the three bands featured in "My Universe"

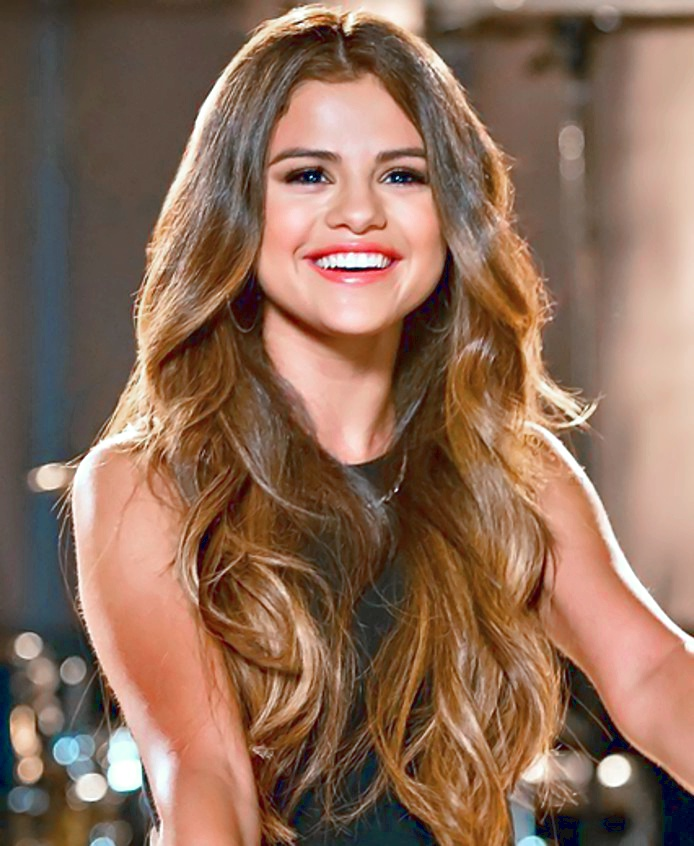
Selena Gomez (pictured in 2013) became Martin's partner for "Let Somebody Go".

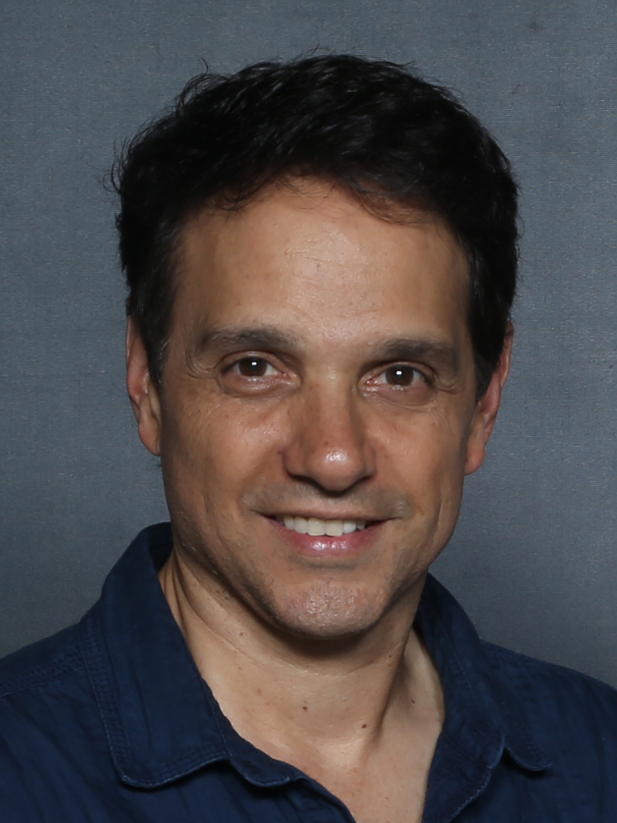
Ralph Macchio (pictured in 2018) starred as an unnamed busker in "The Karate Kid".

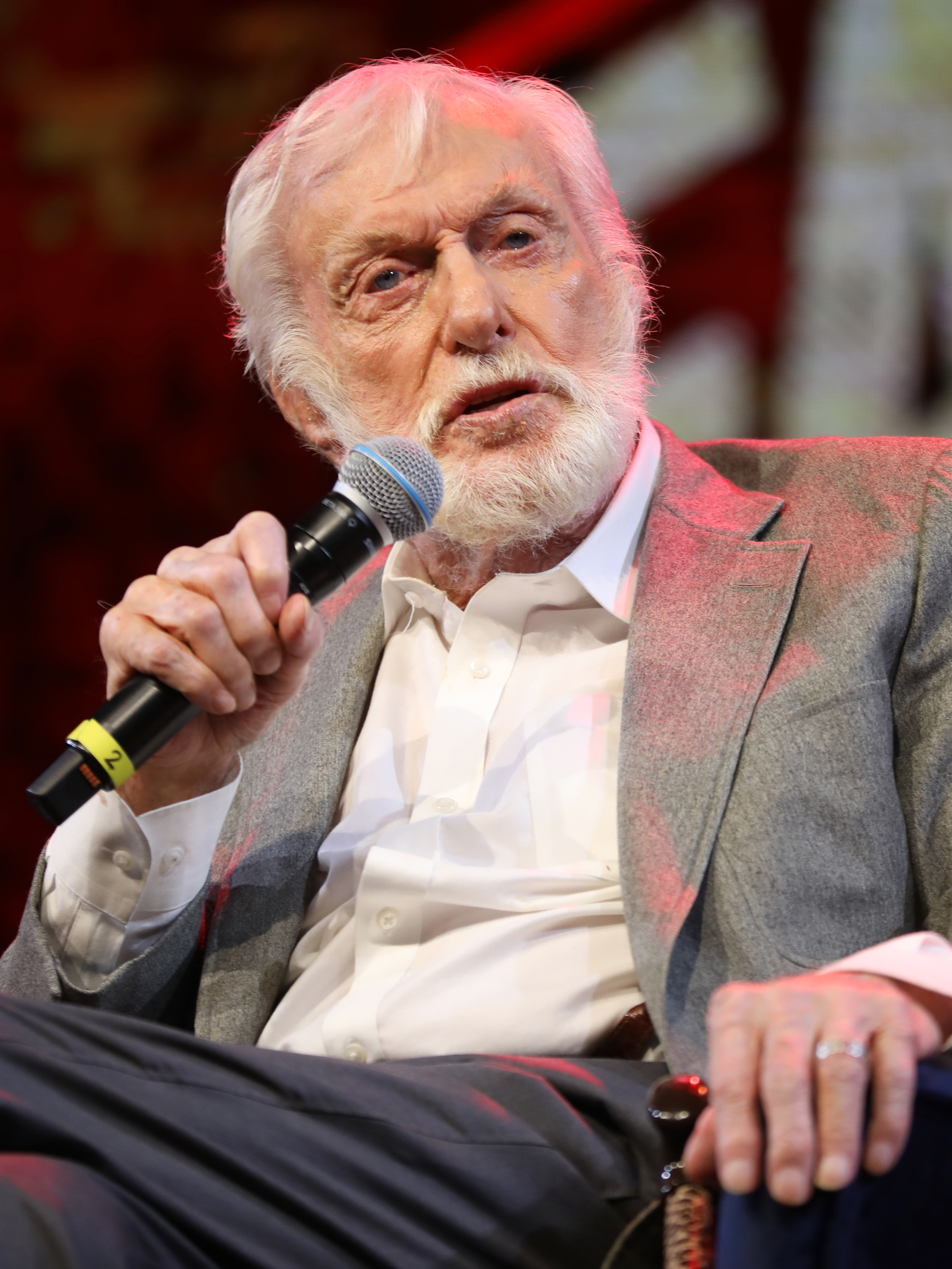
Dick Van Dyke (pictured in 2024) co-produced the music video for "All My Love", which paid homage to his career.

List of music videos
Title	Year	Directors	Details	Ref.
"Bigger Stronger"	1999	Mat Whitecross	A man enters a lift and gets transported to a beach, where he finds the band's members buried in the sand. Despite publishing the music video on their website, Coldplay never released it officially on YouTube.	
"Shiver"	2000	Grant Gee	The band perform the song in a studio. In July 2020, all music videos from Parachutes (2000) were remastered in celebration of its 20th anniversary.	
"Yellow"	2000	James & Alex	A slow motion sequence of Martin walking along the beach as he sings and the sunlight arrives. The music video was meant to include the other band members, but the funeral of Champion's mother was held on the same day.	
"Trouble" †	2000	Tim Hope	The original music video was directed by Sophie Muller and features Martin as a prisoner in a dark warehouse, while Buckland and Champion struggle to tie Berryman to a chair in a slow motion sequence. It was replaced by Hope's version for being "too grisly" for American audiences. His take combined an animated world with real-life footage of the band and earned a MTV Video Music Award for Best Art Direction. In 2012, a fan published the European version on YouTube and received a license from Parlophone.	
"Don't Panic"	2001	Tim Hope	A diagram of the water cycle is shown as a house with the band doing chores inside. The animation style used is vaguely similar to "Trouble", but without real-life footage.	
"In My Place"	2002	Sophie Muller	The band perform the song in a large white room as Martin sings directly to the camera. The two women sitting on a step in the background are members of the crew. In August 2022, the music video was remastered along with "The Scientist" and "Clocks" to celebrate the 20th anniversary of A Rush of Blood to the Head (2002).	
"The Scientist"	2002	Jamie Thraves	The music video uses reverse motion, beginning with Martin lying on a mattress, continuing with him wandering through various locations and revealing he was involved in a car accident along with a woman played by Irish actress Elaine Cassidy. It won three MTV Video Music Awards.	
"Clocks"	2003	Dominic Leung	A stoic crowd watches the band perform the song with a laser show and other stage light effects. A link to the Make Trade Fair website can be seen on Martin's left hand.	
"God Put a Smile upon Your Face"	2003	Jamie Thraves	The music video intercuts black and white footage of the band performing the song with the story of a man who bumps into a mysterious stranger and starts to disappear. He is played by English actor Paddy Considine.	
"Speed of Sound"	2005	Mark Romanek	Coldplay perform the song in a sound stage behind large LED displays. The lights were synthesised to showcase an animation made from Martin's vocal track.	
"Fix You"	2005	Sophie Muller	Martin wanders the streets of London at night as the song's tempo picks up. He finishes the music video by performing with the band at Reebok Stadium, in Bolton.	
"Talk"	2005	Anton Corbijn	In this black and white, science fiction-themed music video, the band are astronauts landing on an alien planet, where they re-activate a dormant robot. It tries to kill them and destroy their spaceship as the group attempts to fly away.	
"The Hardest Part"	2006	Mary Wigmore	The music video uses footage from Attitudes (1985), which was then digitally enhanced to appear as though Coldplay were performing the song along with dancers Barbara Moseley and Gene Spencer. Their set was filmed in 1990.	
"Violet Hill" †	2008	Asa Mader	The band climbs a hill and reach a quiet town to play the song with different instruments. They can also be seen dancing and walking around Mount Etna. Days later, an alternative version named Dancing Politicians, directed by Mat Whitecross, was released. It features numerous shots of political figures combined with scenes of war.	
"Viva la Vida" †	2008	Hype Williams	Coldplay perform the song in a blurry, warped version of the Liberty Leading the People (1830) painting. The band members crumble into rose petals as the song ends. An alternative music video directed by Anton Corbijn was released on the same day as a tribute to Depeche Mode's "Enjoy the Silence". It portrays Martin as the king from the lyrics and ties the loose ends from "Violet Hill".	
"Lovers in Japan"	2008	Mat Whitecross	The music video intercuts footage of the band playing in a courtyard and each member making light drawings. Their performance ends with a rain of butterfly-shaped confetti.	
"Lost!" † (solo or featuring Jay-Z)	2008	Mat Whitecross	Both the original version and the Jay-Z remix have Coldplay performing on the Viva la Vida Tour as the music video, with the rapper appearing through a television in the latter. A fan contest for "Lost?", the song's piano iteration, took place months later. The winning (directed by Paul O'Brien) and runner-up (directed by Martin Buzora) entries gained tickets to see the band live at the O2 Arena.	
"Life in Technicolor II"	2009	Dougal Wilson	A group of children are waiting for a traditional Punch and Judy performance, however, the band appear as puppets "onstage" playing the song on an increasingly extravagant show. Harvey appears as one of the parents with a camera.	
"Strawberry Swing"	2009	Shynola	The music video consists of Martin lying on the floor as he interacts with stop motion animated chalk drawings. His character sees a woman being held hostage by a giant squirrel, which leads him to turn into a superhero and save her. It won three UK Music Video Awards.	
"Christmas Lights"	2010	Mat Whitecross	Whitecross edited the music video in a one-shot format. It begins with the band lying on the floor, until Martin gets up to play the piano and the others disappear. The set is later revealed to be a stage near River Thames and the rest of the group show up again, now accompanied by three Elvis impersonators: Tim Crompton, Harvey and Simon Pegg.	
"Every Teardrop Is a Waterfall"	2011	Mat Whitecross	The band play across various backdrops sprayed with colourful, stop motion animated graffiti, which were painted by Mylo Xyloto (2011) art director Paris.	
"Paradise" †	2011	Mat Whitecross	A runaway elephant played by Martin escapes the zoo and embarks on a journey to find his friends in Cape Town. The music video was filmed in a nature documentary style and had a scrapped version directed by Shynola, who posted their take separately later. Harvey and Crompton made an appearance as the zookeepers chasing the elephant.	
"Charlie Brown"	2012	Mat Whitecross	A hooded young man played by Elliott Tittensor meets up with his girlfriend (played by Antonia Thomas) and they steal a car together, which is used for going to a colourful rave where the band are playing. Coldplay also released a live performance version co-directed by Mark Rowbotham before the official one was finished.	
"Princess of China" (with Rihanna)	2012	Adria Petty; Alan Bibby	The music video portrays Martin and Rihanna as lovers with a complicated story as they engage in a sword fight. It contains visual references to Chinese wuxia films.	
"Hurts Like Heaven"	2012	Mark Osborne	An animated version of the Mylo Xyloto (2011) comics' first issue. The story is set on a futuristic dystopian world where sound and colour are completely forbidden.	
"Midnight"	2014	Mary Wigmore	The music video was mostly shot with thermal infrared imaging and negative imagery, incorporating various visual effects. It shows glimpses of a wandering wolf and sped-up cityscapes, the band can be seen in a forest as well.	
"Magic" †	2014	Jonas Åkerlund	Starring Chinese actress Zhang Ziyi, the music video is a tribute to silent films. She plays the stage magician Cecile, who performs in a travelling circus with her young assistant Christophe (played by Martin). As their work continues, he begins to notice the abusive relationship Cecile has with her husband Claude (also played by Martin), a famous, but alcoholic magician. Christophe then formulates an idea to relieve Cecile of her troubles as he learns levitation. The story happens in the present despite the early 20th century influences. A director's cut with a guest appearance from Peter Fonda was included on Ghost Stories Live 2014.	
"A Sky Full of Stars" †	2014	Mat Whitecross	Martin walks through King Street in Sydney dressed as a one-man band. He then reaches Berryman, Buckland and Champion, who are also dressed as one-man bands. They play the instrumental refrain of the song and he continues his walk alone, being followed by a crowd of fans (including Harvey dressed as a koala). The music video ends with the band reuniting again and finishing the song with their fans as paper-made stars are blown into the square. An alternative scrapped version directed by Artisan was later posted separately, one shot from it can be seen on the official take when Martin passes by a television store.	
"True Love"	2014	Jonas Åkerlund	The music video portrays Martin as a janitor and Canadian actress Jessica Lucas as an aspiring ballerina, both using giant body suits. As they are not taken seriously as dancers or people, the pair face various humiliations on their daily life until meeting each other. Åkerlund commented his idea was "about just being different in the world, where life is a struggle and then you meet somebody who understands you and then it all falls into place".	
"All Your Friends"	2014	Simon Hargood	Released for Remembrance Sunday, the music video pays tribute to "all those from all nations who fought in the First World War" with archival footage. It was released as part of the bonus content for Ghost Stories Live 2014.	
"Always in My Head"	2014	Alasdair Brotherston; Jock Mooney	An animated version of the Ghost Stories (2014) album cover. The music video displays the numerous illustrations present in the wings and was released as part of the bonus content for Ghost Stories Live 2014.	
"Ink" †	2014	Matthew Encina	The original music video was an animated interactive project in the style of Choose Your Own Adventure (1979) and told the story of a men travelling across the world in search of his lost lover. It had 300 possible outcomes and a final version was published on Coldplay's YouTube channel based on the fans' most selected options.	
"Ghost Story"	2015	Campbell Hooper	Black and white shots of the band performing the song fade into each other. The music video was released as part of the bonus content for Ghost Stories Live 2014.	
"Adventure of a Lifetime"	2015	Mat Whitecross	Filmed at the Imaginarium, the music video follows a group of chimpanzees that come across a Beats Pill and become inspired to form a band. Each one of them was designed to resemble the members of Coldplay.	
"Birds"	2016	Marcus Haney	The music video follows the band at the Salvation Mountain as they shoot photos that were later used for the promotion campaign of A Head Full of Dreams (2015).	
"Hymn for the Weekend"	2016	Ben Mor	Coldplay pays a visit to Mumbai, India. The video was also inspired by the Holi festival and feature appearances from Beyoncé and Sonam Kapoor.	
"Up&Up"	2016	Vania Heymann; Gal Muggia	Featuring surrealistic elements such as a popcorn-spouting volcano, racehorses galloping on water and a turtle floating down a subway platform, the music video alludes to various contemporary issues and received two silver prizes at the Cannes Lions International Festival of Creativity.	
"A Head Full of Dreams"	2016	Marcus Haney	The band wanders around the streets of Mexico City on bicycles as they make their way to a concert of the A Head Full of Dreams Tour. The music video also uses a snippet from Charlie Chaplin's The Great Dictator (1940).	
"Everglow" †	2016	Ben Mor	Martin performs the song on a piano. A scrapped version directed by Joe Connor was made available separately in 2017. It features an ice dancer (played by Tanja Kolbe) who is coping with loss as she dances with a partner who is no longer there. A fansite published the take on YouTube and received a license from Parlophone as well.	
"Something Just Like This" (Tokyo Remix) (with the Chainsmokers)	2017	Mat Whitecross	The music video intercuts footage of Coldplay's Tokyo Dome show, the Chainsmokers performing at a festival and a boy wearing a superhero costume as he plays with toys on his bedroom. It also uses a kaleidoscope effect.	
"Orphans"	2019	Mat Whitecross	Starting with a voice note from Martin, in which he is heard playing what would become the song's main riff, the music video shows how the track was developed from its earliest roots to the fully polished version that was released. It won a MTV Video Music Award for Best Rock Video.	
"Daddy"	2019	Åsa Lucander	The music video combines live action puppetry, digitally painted sets and traditional animation to tell the story of a young girl lost at sea and sailing towards the unknown, symbolising the memories she has of her father. It won two silver prizes at the Clio Awards.	
"Everyday Life"	2019	Karena Evans	Footage of the band performing the song on a beach is combined with scenes from around the globe in countries such as Ukraine, South Africa and Morocco. The music video is themed after the Xhosa word "ubuntu", which can be translated to "humanity".	
"Cry Cry Cry"	2020	Dakota Johnson; Cory Bailey	The music video shows a couple played by Meshach Henry and Ida Saki dancing as they age from young lovers to old married partners while Coldplay perform the song.	
"Champion of the World"	2020	Cloé Bailly	Martin plays a bullied schoolboy who is forced to repeatedly escape reality and enter his own dreamworld.	
"Trouble in Town"	2020	Aoife McArdle	Inspired by George Orwell's Animal Farm (1944), book the music video shows New York City plagued by crimes and homelessness under the regime of a pig dictator. Proceeds from the song were donated to the Innocence Project and the African Children's Feeding Scheme.	
"Higher Power" †	2021	Dave Meyers	Landing on a post-apocalyptic planet, Martin explores its cities and meets a group of alien holograms. He dances with them as Berryman, Buckland and Champion appear playing the song and their combined energy allows him to fly into outer space. A visualizer of the band performing the track on a container depot, directed by Paul Dugdale, was released in anticipation for the official version. Following the latter's debut, a choreography video was issued with the Ambiguous Dance Company.	
"My Universe" (with BTS)	2021	Dave Meyers	The music video depicts Coldplay, BTS and fictional alien band Supernova 7 performing the song together on different planets. The groups are then united as holograms through alien DJ Lafrique, who broadcasts the performance with her radio ship. They are being hunted by the Silencers from the Mylo Xyloto (2011) comics, suggesting its universe is connected with Music of the Spheres (2021).	
"Let Somebody Go" (with Selena Gomez)	2022	Dave Meyers	Martin and Gomez try to reach out for each other as a city pulls them apart until they finally manage to have a final hug. The black and white music video drew comparisons to Inception (2010), by Christopher Nolan.	
"People of the Pride"	2022	Paul Dugdale	The music video intercuts footage of the band playing the song at Climate Pledge Arena and animated scenes which were used as their stage backdrop during concerts.	
"Biutyful"	2022	Mat Whitecross	After meeting each other at a local bar, a fictional puppet group named The Weirdos try to have a successful musical career while living in a humans-only world.	
"Humankind"	2022	Stevie Rae Gibbs; Marcus Haney	Coldplay perform the song at Foro Sol. The music video features time-lapsed images of Mexico City seen through an "alien camera" as well. Its interface and footage include the name of cities such as Barcelona, Cardiff, Zürich and Amsterdam written both regularly and in the fictional alien languages created for the track's parent album, leading fans to speculate those places would host Music of the Spheres World Tour shows.	
"Feelslikeimfallinginlove" †	2024	Ben Mor	Natasha Ofili and the Coro de Manos Blancas join the band to play the song in sign language over a dark background, which changes to a concert at the Odeon of Herodes Atticus in Athens. Footage was rendered in black and white, being made available in Disability Pride Month. An alternative one-shot version, directed by Ant Barrett, was later released for the Zerb remix. It presents a helmeted man dancing through Helsinki with Martin. Mor published his director's cut with coloured frames separately as well.	
"We Pray" † (featuring Little Simz, Burna Boy, Elyanna and Tini)	2024	James Zwadlo	Three music videos were released: the Little Simz version is considered the original, mixing footage of the collaborators with artworks and lyrics; the Tini version sees them together at Grafton Street in Dublin, as directed by Ben Mor; and the Elyanna version comes from their performance at Croke Park, shot by Ant Barrett.	
"The Karate Kid"	2024	Chris Candy	Ralph Macchio busks on the streets of Melbourne with a keyboard to get money for dinner. Rejected by onlookers, he changes his performance to tap dancing, consequently meeting a tout who offers Coldplay tickets in exchange for a watch and a toy. During the show, Martin faces vocal issues and Macchio helps him to finish the track.	
"All My Love" (Director's Cut) †	2024	Spike Jonze; Mary Wigmore	Dick Van Dyke dances and meditates on aging, family and love at his house in Malibu. The music video also includes footage from the actor's greatest works. A final cut directed by Nigel Crisp was premiered on his 99th birthday. The visual for the Pnau remix accompanies Crisp having beach day, as documented by Chris Candy.	
"Man in the Moon"	2025	Ben Mor	Young locals from different backgrounds explore Singapore and its prominent landmarks while Coldplay are performing the song at Marina Bay, bringing the groups together.	

== Video albums ==
List of video albums
Title	Details	Peak chart positions										Certifications
Title	Details	UK Video	AUS DVD	AUT DVD	BEL (FL) DVD	BEL (WA) DVD	DEN DVD	ITA DVD	NLD DVD	POR DVD	US Video	Certifications
Live 2003	Released: 10 November 2003; Label: Parlophone; Formats: DVD, UMD	2	—	2	8	—	—	1	1	—	1	BPI: 2× Platinum; AFP: Platinum; ARIA: 8× Platinum; IFPI AUT: Gold; MC: 8× Platinum; RIAA: 6× Platinum
Live from Austin City Limits	Released: 27 January 2006; Label: Capitol; Formats: Download (DL)	Released exclusively on iTunes United States										N/A
Live 2012	Released: 20 November 2012; Label: Parlophone; Formats: DVD, Blu-ray	1	1	—	1	1	2	1	1	1	2	BPI: 4× Platinum; AFP: Platinum; ARIA: 7× Platinum; MC: 4× Platinum
Ghost Stories Live 2014	Released: 24 November 2014; Label: Parlophone; Formats: DVD, Blu-ray	2	—	—	6	3	—	—	4	—	—	BPI: Gold
Live in São Paulo	Released: 7 December 2018; Label: Parlophone; Formats: DVD	Part of The Butterfly Package and not sold separately										N/A
"—" denotes a recording that did not chart or was not released in that territory.

== Film ==
List of film appearances
Title	Year	Details	Ref.
How We Saw the World – Live in Toronto	2006	Concert film directed by Hamish Hamilton and released in television channels worldwide	(Note: Also known as Live in Toronto 2006.)
A Head Full of Dreams	2018	Music documentary directed by Mat Whitecross and released in cinemas worldwide	
Everyday Life – Live in Jordan	2019	Music film directed by Paul Dugdale and released on YouTube	
Reimagined	2020	Music short film directed by Andy Hines and released on Apple Music	
Music of the Spheres: Live at River Plate	2023	Music film directed by Paul Dugdale and released in cinemas worldwide	
Tutto Passa – A Tribute to Napoli	2024	Tribute short film directed by Stillz and released on YouTube	
A Film for the Future	2025	Music film executive produced by Ben Mor and released on YouTube	

== Television ==
List of television appearances
Title	Year	Details	Ref.
Rage	2001	24 February 2001: Guest appearance	
Max Masters: Coldplay	2008	7 June 2008: Exclusive documentary	
The South Bank Show	2009	Season 33, Episode 2: Exclusive documentary	
The Simpsons	2010	Season 21, Episode 11: Guest appearance	
Saturday Night Live	2011	Season 37, Episode 6: "Someone Like You" sketch	(Note: In addition to the sketch with Coldplay, Martin took part in the "Garth & Kat" segment with Fred Armisen and Kristen Wiig.)
Coldplay: Ghost Stories	2014	Ghost Stories premiere including a special programme, interview and performance	
Dynamo: Magician Impossible	2014	Guest appearance performing a magic trick with Dynamo	
Game of Thrones: The Musical	2015	Mockumentary for Red Nose Day	
Rockfield: The Studio on the Farm	2020	Guest appearance telling their history with Rockfield Studios	
Dynamo Is Dead	2023	Guest appearance offering advice to Dynamo	

== Advertisements ==
List of advertisements
Company	Year	Product	Theme song	Region	Ref.
Apple	2008	iTunes Store	"Viva la Vida"	United States	
Target	2014	Ghost Stories	"A Sky Full of Stars"	United States	
Beats	2015	Beats Pill	"Adventure of a Lifetime"	Various	
BMW	2021	BMW iX · BMW i4	"Higher Power"	Various	
DHL	2022	Music of the Spheres World Tour	"Yellow"	Various	
Kia	2024	Kia EV9	"Wish I Was Here"	United States	
DHL	2024	Music of the Spheres World Tour	"Good Feelings"	Various	

== See also ==
- Coldplay discography
- List of songs by Coldplay
- List of cover versions of Coldplay songs
