= List of number-one hits of 2024 (Austria) =

This is a list of the Austrian number-one singles and albums of 2024 as compiled by Ö3 Austria Top 40, the official chart provider of Austria.

Issue date	Song	Artist	Album	Artist
2 January	"All I Want for Christmas Is You"	Mariah Carey	Hackney Diamonds	The Rolling Stones
9 January	"Prada"	Cassö, Raye and D-Block Europe	Hackney Diamonds	The Rolling Stones
16 January	"Time"	Luciano	Einfach echt	Daniela Alfinito
23 January	"Prada"	Cassö, Raye and D-Block Europe	Neujahrskonzert 2024 – New Year's Concert	Wiener Philharmoniker/Christian Thielemann
30 January	"Prada"	Cassö, Raye and D-Block Europe	Phönix aus der Asche	Fantasy
6 February	"Unwritten"	Natasha Bedingfield	Komet	Oliver Haidt
13 February	"Unwritten"	Natasha Bedingfield	Neujahrskonzert 2024 – New Year's Concert	Wiener Philharmoniker/Christian Thielemann
20 February	"Beautiful Things"	Benson Boone	Vultures 1	Kanye West and Ty Dolla Sign
27 February	"Beautiful Things"	Benson Boone	Vultures 1	Kanye West and Ty Dolla Sign
5 March	"Beautiful Things"	Benson Boone	Was ma heut net träumen	Ina Regen and Tonkünstler-Orchester
12 March	"Beautiful Things"	Benson Boone	The Mandrake Project	Bruce Dickinson
19 March	"Beautiful Things"	Benson Boone	Invincible Shield	Judas Priest
26 March	"Beautiful Things"	Benson Boone	MTV Unplugged in Wien	Christina Stürmer
2 April	"Beautiful Things"	Benson Boone	Off	Alligatoah
9 April	"I Like the Way You Kiss Me"	Artemas	Cowboy Carter	Beyoncé
16 April	"I Like the Way You Kiss Me"	Artemas	Das Empörium schlägt zurück	Aut of Orda
23 April	"I Like the Way You Kiss Me"	Artemas	One Deep River	Mark Knopfler
30 April	"I Like the Way You Kiss Me"	Artemas	The Tortured Poets Department	Taylor Swift
7 May	"I Like the Way You Kiss Me"	Artemas	The Tortured Poets Department	Taylor Swift
14 May	"I Like the Way You Kiss Me"	Artemas	Radical Optimism	Dua Lipa
21 May	"I Like the Way You Kiss Me"	Artemas	The Tortured Poets Department	Taylor Swift
28 May	"I Like the Way You Kiss Me"	Artemas	Hit Me Hard and Soft	Billie Eilish
4 June	"I Like the Way You Kiss Me"	Artemas	Hit Me Hard and Soft	Billie Eilish
11 June	"Houdini"	Eminem	Symphonisch in Schönbrunn	Rainhard Fendrich with the Philharmonie Salzburg\
18 June	"Houdini"	Eminem	Ende nie	Wanda
25 June	"Houdini"	Eminem	Gefühlsecht	Nockis
2 July	"I Like the Way You Kiss Me"	Artemas	Görlitzer Park	K.I.Z
9 July	"I Like the Way You Kiss Me"	Artemas	Gefühlsecht	Nockis
16 July	"I Like the Way You Kiss Me"	Artemas	Hit Me Hard and Soft	Billie Eilish
23 July	"Houdini"	Eminem	The Death of Slim Shady (Coup de Grâce)	Eminem
30 July	"Houdini"	Eminem	Ate	Stray Kids
6 August	"Bauch Beine Po"	Shirin David	Wake Up the Wicked	Powerwolf
13 August	"Bauch Beine Po"	Shirin David	The Tortured Poets Department	Taylor Swift
20 August	"Out of the Dark"	RAF Camora	The Tortured Poets Department	Taylor Swift
27 August	"Out of the Dark"	RAF Camora	In Liebe	Ayliva
3 September	"Bauch Beine Po"	Shirin David	Short n' Sweet	Sabrina Carpenter
10 September	"Bauch Beine Po"	Shirin David	Wilmersdorfs Kind	Ski Aggu
17 September	"The Emptiness Machine"	Linkin Park	Luck and Strange	David Gilmour
24 September	"The Emptiness Machine"	Linkin Park	Luck and Strange	David Gilmour
1 October	"The Emptiness Machine"	Linkin Park	Stimmen der Nacht	Die Amigos
8 October	"The Emptiness Machine"	Linkin Park	Udo 90	Udo Jürgens
15 October	"The Emptiness Machine"	Linkin Park	Moon Music	Coldplay
22 October	"The Emptiness Machine"	Linkin Park	Moon Music	Coldplay
29 October	"The Emptiness Machine"	Linkin Park	Andrea Berg	Andrea Berg
5 November	"The Emptiness Machine"	Linkin Park	Gameboy	Bonez MC
12 November	"The Emptiness Machine"	Linkin Park	Songs of a Lost World	The Cure
19 November	"The Emptiness Machine"	Linkin Park	Die schönsten Kinderlieder	Helene Fischer
26 November	"The Emptiness Machine"	Linkin Park	From Zero	Linkin Park
3 December	"All I Want for Christmas Is You"	Mariah Carey	From Zero	Linkin Park
10 December	"Last Christmas"	Wham!	The Tortured Poets Department	Taylor Swift
17 December	"Last Christmas"	Wham!	From Zero	Linkin Park
24 December	No Top 40 released			
31 December	"Last Christmas"	Wham!	Christmas	Michael Bublé
