= Good Feelings =

2024 song by Coldplay and Ayra Starr

Song by Coldplay and Ayra Starr

from the album Moon Music
- Released: 4 October 2024
- Recorded: 2024
- Genre: Dance-pop; disco-pop
- Length: 3:37
- Label: Parlophone; Atlantic
- Songwriters: Oyinkansola Aderibigbe; Guy Berryman; Jonny Buckland; Will Champion; Chris Martin; Alex Pall; Nile Rodgers; Andrew Taggart
- Producers: Max Martin; Oscar Holter; Bill Rahko; Daniel Green; Michael Ilbert; The Chainsmokers; Jon Hopkins; Tate McDowell

Visualizer
- "Good Feelings" on YouTube

"Good Feelings" is a song by British rock band Coldplay and Nigerian singer Ayra Starr. Included on their tenth studio album, Moon Music (2024), the track was produced by Max Martin, Oscar Holter, Bill Rahko, Daniel Green, Michael Ilbert, and The Chainsmokers, who also co-wrote the song alongside Coldplay, Starr and Nile Rodgers. Musically, "Good Feelings" is a dance-pop and disco-pop song built upon a funk-inspired bassline, keyboard programming, and driving percussion. Its lyrics recall a summer romance through themes of radio-fueled dancing and moonlit nights, while urging the listener to maintain a positive outlook.

Music critics generally gave "Good Feelings" mixed to positive reviews, praising its upbeat, "radio-ready" disco-funk production and the vocal interplay between Martin and Starr. Some reviewers viewed the track as a standout on the album, though others were polarized by its repetitive lyrics, concluding choir arrangement, and reliance on outside collaborators. Although the band opted to release "All My Love" as the album's third single, "Good Feelings" garnered attention for its groovy instrumentation.

Beyond its recorded reception, "Good Feelings" became a centerpiece of the band's live shows. Coldplay debuted the song live with Starr at Rome's Stadio Olimpico on 12 July 2024, during the European leg of the Music of the Spheres World Tour. The song further became a regular fixture in the band's setlist for both stadium concerts and promotional appearances, such as an intimate set at the Music Hall of Williamsburg and a performance on NBC's Today Show. Throughout the tour, the track was staged within a production featuring immersive lighting and, on select dates, guest performances.

== Background and development ==
Coldplay returned to the studio in November 2022 following the South American leg of the Music of the Spheres World Tour. On 12 December, American guitarist and Chic co-founder Nile Rodgers posted a photograph of himself and lead singer Chris Martin to his TikTok account, taken at The Beehive, one of Coldplay's private studios. A whiteboard visible behind the pair listed potential tracks for the forthcoming album, among them "Good Feelings". Three days later, Rodgers publicly confirmed his involvement with the band, referring to the sessions as a "spiritual" experience. The following January, Martin revealed the album's title to Canadian newscast CityNews, describing Moon Music as "the second Music of the Spheres volume" and adding that it "won't come out for a little bit."

"Good Feelings" had previously been in the running for Coldplay's ninth studio album, Music of the Spheres (2021). An earlier version, produced by Max Martin, was rumored to feature the American electronic duo The Chainsmokers, who had previously collaborated with Coldplay on the 2017 single "Something Just Like This," but that version was ultimately left off the album. For Moon Music, the featured vocal role was taken by Nigerian singer-songwriter Ayra Starr. She had met both Martin and Max Martin in the studio before the album's completion. Speaking to the BBC ahead of her Glastonbury debut in June 2024, she said of Martin: "I've loved Chris for so long, and he's been very supportive." She recalled playing him her sophomore album The Year I Turned 21 before its release: "He was giving me tips, and Max Martin was giving me tips. I took them all. I was like, 'Yes, I'll do all of that!'"

Nile Rodgers contributed the track's "disco-inflected" guitar work. He described his involvement as an unplanned occurrence: "I happened to walk in the studio and they just asked me to join the circle. I had my guitar, walked in and started playing. It wound up being cool." Recording sessions for Moon Music took place at The Rainforest studios and the Punta Paloma studio in Tarifa, Spain, where Coldplay spent two weeks between July and August 2024 while playing their European tour dates.

== Composition ==
"Good Feelings" runs for three minutes and thirty-seven seconds. It was written by Chris Martin, Jonny Buckland, Guy Berryman, Will Champion, Oyinkansola Sarah Aderibigbe, Nile Rodgers, Andrew Taggart, and Alex Pall, with vocal arrangement by Love Choir. The song was produced by Max Martin, Oscar Holter, Bill Rahko, Daniel Green, Michael Ilbert, and the Chainsmokers, including additional production by Jon Hopkins and Tate McDowell. It is written in F major in common time, at approximately 111 beats per minute, and follows a chord progression of F, A minor, B-flat major, and G minor seventh.

A dance-pop and disco-pop song, "Good Feelings" features keyboards and programming from various members of the production team, guitar from Martin, Buckland, and Rodgers, bass from Berryman, drums from Champion, and percussion and sound effects from Bateria Vanguarda. Ilbert mixed the track, and Randy Merrill mastered it. NME's Andrew Trendell described the song as "disco-indebted". Mike DeWald of Riff Magazine heard soul and disco in its "bass-laden stomp", adding that Starr's voice provided an "excellent contrast" to Martin's and helped expand the band’s sound. In The National, Saeed Saeed called it "the kind of synth-funk tune Maroon 5 would have killed for", arguing that its "warbling", "sped-up vocal effects" never overshadow Martin's "chirpy" lead. Al Newstead of the ABC regarded it as "a pleasurably shiny slice of disco-funk and French Touch slap bass." Writing for AS.com, Paul Reidy went further, hearing a "big Chic feel" in the track. Reidy also flagged the song as a potential contender for a third single on first listen. However, Coldplay instead chose "All My Love" for that role, and "Good Feelings" was never released as a single.

Lyrically, the song recalls a summer romance through images of dancing to the radio and moonlit nights, while repeatedly urging the listener to hold on to positive feelings. It opens with a chanted vocal intro before Martin delivers the first verse and pre-chorus. Starr and Martin share the chorus before Starr takes the second verse alone. They trade lines through a second pre-chorus and chorus before moving into a bridge. There, a wordless "la-la" vocalization passes among the Love Choir, Starr, and Martin, punctuated by a pair of brief spoken lines. The chorus repeats once more, and the song closes with an outro sung by the choir.

== Critical reception ==
"Good Feelings" received mixed to positive reviews from music critics. Neil Z. Yeung of AllMusic described the track as "radio-ready," while Jon Dolan of Rolling Stone likened it to a "smooth, sweet slice of Michael Jackson/Maroon 5 feel-goodness." Andrew Shevlin from The Daily Illini commended its "groovy bassline and driving percussion," and Emma Harrison, writing for Clash Music, lauded it as a "disco-infused" standout. The Daily Bruin's Reid Sperisen offered a mixed assessment; he praised the "legitimately catchy" dynamic between Martin and Starr, but expressed disappointment in the track's conclusion, writing that it descended into sounds resembling a "children’s choir" that dismantled the song's "escapist aura."

Other critics focused on the song's composition and lyrical content. Louis Chilton of The Independent felt the song "platitudinously" reiterated basic themes, criticizing the repetition as "ad nauseam." Similarly, Megan Wallitsch of The Good 5 Cent Cigar argued that the track relied too heavily on repetitive phrasing and "la-la-la" sections. Gabriel Barnett from Renowned for Sound remarked that while the bassline was strong, Martin's "strained vocals" hindered the song's potential. Pitchfork's Hannah Jocelyn questioned the band's reliance on co-writers such as the Chainsmokers, characterizing the song as a "stylistic detour."

== Live performances ==
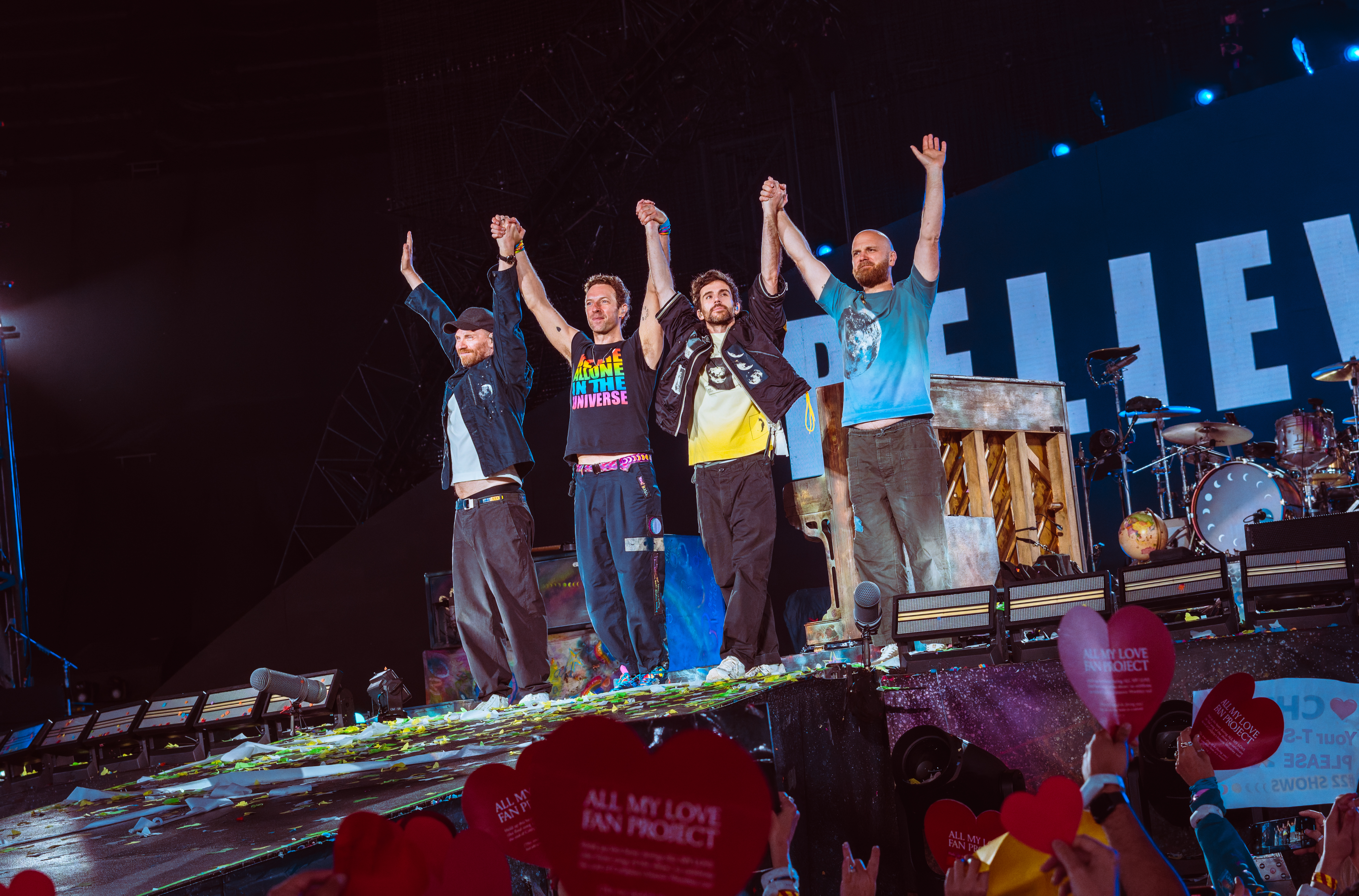
Coldplay at Wembley Stadium in September 2025 during the Music of the Spheres World Tour

"Good Feelings" was debuted live prior to its studio release, when Coldplay performed the track with featured artist Ayra Starr at Rome's Stadio Olimpico on 12 July 2024, during the European leg of their Music of the Spheres World Tour. Following the release of Moon Music on 4 October 2024, the song was included on the set list of a series of small promotional shows. On 7 October 2024, the band performed the song during a 650-capacity SiriusXM Presents set at the Music Hall of Williamsburg in Brooklyn. Joe Lynch of Billboard praised the performance, writing that Martin was "warm and congenial" with the crowd throughout the show and stating that "Good Feelings" was among the highlights of the night's material, with Starr joining the band onstage alongside the tour's puppet alien act, the "Weirdos". On 8 October 2024, Coldplay appeared for a short slot on NBC's Today Show at Rockefeller Plaza, once more welcoming Starr, as part of the Citi Concert Series.

During the standard stadium legs of the Music of the Spheres World Tour, "Good Feelings" was staged within a production designed by Misty Buckley with lighting by Sooner Routhier. The set design consisted of three round stages connected by runways, two 14-meter circular screens, four inflatable LED spheres, and a 44-meter-wide arched video wall nicknamed "Moonrise". For these stadium appearances, Martin wore a customized upcycled t-shirt and multi-colored sneakers. Coming out of "Fix You", the crowd was instructed to put on the cardboard diffraction glasses distributed at entry, known on the tour as the "Moon Goggles." For the duration of the track, the stage lighting transformed into a field of shimmering hearts and stars. On select tour stops, the song also featured that night's opening act joining Coldplay onstage.

On 30 October 2024, the band performed the song during the opening night of the tour's Australian leg at Melbourne's Marvel Stadium. Bassist Guy Berryman fell ill shortly before the concert, marking the first time in the band's history that they performed a full show without a founding member. Martin walked out alone ahead of the set to explain the change to the audience. The band's engineer and co-producer, Bill Rahko, filled in on bass with roughly 30 minutes' notice, wearing a costume and performing over Berryman's studio recording to remain synchronized with the automated click track. Drummer Will Champion also played bass on a few older songs later in the set. Kiel Egging of Rolling Stone Australia treated the missing bassist as a footnote to a "feel-good spectacular that's made them the masters of putting on a stadium show." Greg Phillips of Australian Musician commended the performance, writing that it brought "electronic funk to the party," in a review that separately portrayed the overall visual production as an overwhelming spectacle. "Good Feelings" was regularly paired with "feelslikeimfallinginlove" across the tour's 2024 dates, usually performed back-to-back late in the set. At the Hard Rock Stadium stop in Miami Gardens on 27 July 2025, that pairing was extended into a medley, with Starr returning to the stage to perform her own single "Hot Body" alongside Martin between the two Coldplay songs.

== Credits and personnel ==
Credits adapted from Tidal.

Composition and lyrics

- Alex Pall – composer
- Chris Martin – composer
- Guy Berryman – composer
- Jonny Buckland – composer
- Love Choir – vocal arranger
- Nile Rodgers – composer
- Will Champion – composer
- Andrew Taggart – composer
- Oyinkansola Sarah Aderibigbe – composer

Production and engineering

- Bill Rahko – engineer, producer
- Connor Panayi – assistant engineer
- Daniel Green – engineer, producer
- Duncan Fuller – assistant engineer
- Eric Eylands – assistant engineer
- Fran Edwards – assistant engineer
- Gianluca Massimo – assistant engineer
- Jed Rimmell – assistant engineer
- Johnny Drille – additional engineer
- Jon Hopkins – additional production
- Kian Moghaddamzadeh – assistant engineer
- Max Martin – producer
- Michael Ilbert – engineer, mixer, producer
- Miguel Lara – assistant engineer
- Niamh O'Sullivan – assistant engineer
- Oscar Holter – producer
- Randy Merrill – mastering engineer
- Sam Holland – assistant engineer
- Simon Salabim – assistant engineer
- Tate McDowell – additional production
- The Chainsmokers – producer
- Tomas Crow – assistant engineer
- Wil Jones – assistant engineer

Performers

- Ayra Starr – vocals
- Alex Pall – keyboards, programmer
- Bateria Vanguarda – percussion, sound effects
- Bill Rahko – additional vocals
- Brandon Winbush – choir vocals
- Chris Martin – guitar, keyboards, piano, vocals
- Daniel Green – programmer
- Denise Carite – choir vocals
- Dorian Holley – choir vocals
- Andrew Taggart – keyboards, programmer
- Guy Berryman – bass
- Jonny Buckland – guitar
- Max Martin – keyboards, programmer
- Neka Hamilton – choir vocals
- Nile Rodgers – guitar
- Oscar Holter – programmer
- Sharlotte Gibson – choir vocals
- Stevie Mackey – choir vocals
- Toni Scruggs – choir vocals
- Will Champion – drums

== Charts ==
Weekly chart performance
Chart (2024)	Peak position
New Zealand Hot Singles (RMNZ)	6
Nigeria (TurnTable Top 100)	92
South Korea BGM (Circle)	116
South Korea Download (Circle)	198
UK Singles Sales (Official Charts)	86
