= Moon Music =

2024 studio album by Coldplay

- Standard edition cover

Studio album by Coldplay
- Released: 4 October 2024
- Recorded: 2022–2024
- Studios: Punta Paloma (Tarifa); The Rainforest (Los Angeles)
- Genre: Pop rock
- Length: 43:57
- Languages: English; Zulu
- Labels: Parlophone; Atlantic
- Producers: Bill Rahko; Dan Green; Max Martin; Michael Ilbert; Jon Hopkins; Oscar Holter; Ilya; The Chainsmokers

Coldplay chronology
Music of the Spheres (2021)	Moon Music (2024)

Singles from Moon Music
- 1. "Feelslikeimfallinginlove" Released: 21 June 2024; 2. "We Pray" Released: 23 August 2024; 3. "All My Love" Released: 4 October 2024

Moon Music (full title: Music of the Spheres Vol. II: Moon Music) is the tenth studio album by British rock band Coldplay. Released on 4 October 2024 by Parlophone in the United Kingdom and Atlantic in the United States, it serves as the second part of their Music of the Spheres project, the first being From Earth with Love (2021). Three editions of the album were made available: Notebook, Tour and Full Moon. Each one has its own exclusive content, including voice memos and bonus tracks.

Production was primarily handled by Bill Rahko, Dan Green, Michael Ilbert and Max Martin, with additional work by Jon Hopkins, Ilya Salmanzadeh, Oscar Holter and the Chainsmokers. Hopkins is also credited as a featured artist, along with Burna Boy, Little Simz, Elyanna, Tini and Ayra Starr. To promote Moon Music, Coldplay released the singles "Feelslikeimfallinginlove", "We Pray" and "All My Love", later complemented by a visual album called A Film for the Future. The band supported both albums from their Music of the Spheres project on the Music of the Spheres World Tour.

Moon Music received mixed reviews from critics, who praised its melodies and diversity, but were critical of the lyrics. Commercially, the album peaked at number one in 16 countries, including the United Kingdom, where Coldplay achieved their 10th chart-topper and had the highest first-week sales of the decade by a group (237,000 units). It also topped the Billboard 200 in the United States with 120,000 units sold, marking the first time since 2016 that a British band reached number one on both charts simultaneously.

== Background ==
Following the release of Coldplay's ninth studio album Music of the Spheres, the subtitle Vol. I: From Earth with Love was mentioned several times, hinting at a follow-up to the album in the following years. In January 2023, while speaking to CityNews about the Music of the Spheres World Tour, Chris Martin revealed the title of their next album, Moon Music, declaring that it was in its finishing stage and that it would be the second Music of the Spheres volume. Throughout the Music of the Spheres World Tour, the band performed some songs from their tenth record project.

On 17 June 2024, Coldplay announced through their social media that Moon Music would be released on 4 October. On 16 August 2024, the band revealed its track listing. El Mundo, Los Angeles Times, Vulture, and To Vima ranked the album among the most anticipated of the year.

== Recording and composition ==
The album was partially recorded at the Punta Paloma studio in Tarifa, Spain. Coldplay spent two weeks at the office – between July and August 2024 – and used it as a "base of operations" while playing their shows in Rome, Düsseldorf and Helsinki. Asked about the meaning behind the title, Chris Martin stated "it has to do with accepting all the different phases [of life]" and "shining your light without any needs for anything in return". Moon Music is generally described as a pop rock album with music influences from funk, afrobeat and electronic music.

"Moon Music is kind of the story of waking up in the morning and feeling terrible about yourself, terrible about the world—depressed, isolated, separate, alone, and not able to be yourself. Through the album, it's a journey to feeling the complete opposite at the end of the day".

— Chris Martin, on Moon Music

== Artwork and package ==
The album cover features a moonbow shot, taken by Argentine photographer Matías Alonso Revelli in 2020. Coldplay's team contacted him directly to use the picture, and while he offered more options, the band ultimately maintained their initial choice. The rest of the package was designed by long-time collaborator Pilar Zeta. CD versions of Moon Music were created from 90% recycled polycarbonate, while each vinyl came from nine recycled PET-plastic bottles. Both products were the first of their kind, being sourced from post-consumer waste streams. Variety reported that taking this measure prevented the manufacturing of more than 30 metric tonnes of virgin plastic across all formats.

== Promotion ==
=== Budget ===
According to court documents released ahead of Moon Music, former manager Dave Holmes claimed to have negotiated a £35 million budget advance with Parlophone. Expenses included clearing samples, arranging recording sessions, recruiting producers and promotional campaigns. However, since he was dismissed from his duties afterwards, it remains unclear whether or not the entire budget was used.

=== Marketing ===
In anticipation for the album, the band launched numerous immersive listening pop-up events around the world. They were held between 1 and 7 October, including cities such as Auckland, Berlin, Beijing, London, Paris and Toronto, in addition to San Juan's Valle de la Luna. Coldplay also partnered with Record Store Day to have premieres in indie record stores across the United States on 1 October, while the following day saw the launch of a global theatrical event. NME shared that all proceeds from "Good Feelings" would be donated to Choose Love. The Seoul Metropolitan Government teamed up with the band for a drone light show at Ttukseom Hangang Park to celebrate the album and their shows in South Korea. As part of FC Barcelona's sponsorship deal with Spotify, Coldplay launched a new team shirt design and had its proceeds directed toward UNHCR. They also collaborated with TikTok and Roblox. On 22 January 2025, the group released A Film for the Future. It was executive produced by Ben Mor, featuring more than 150 artists from 45 countries worldwide. The premiere was held on YouTube, with 360-degree screenings also taking place in select cities.

=== Singles ===
Lead single "Feelslikeimfallinginlove" was released on 21 June 2024, with its music video being shot at the Odeon of Herodes Atticus in Athens, Greece. Regional outlets estimated that the filming had a budget of €3 million, ranking among the most expensive of all time. The second single, "We Pray" featured Little Simz, Burna Boy, Elyanna and Tini and was made available on 23 August. Despite not being a single, "IAAM" received a special premiere on 27 September, as part of the EA Sports FC 25. The third and final single, "All My Love", came out with a lyric video on 4 October. Chris Martin stated it would be the final single from Coldplay's career. The official music video, starring American actor Dick Van Dyke, was released as a director's cut on 6 December and followed by a shorter version on 13 December. Spike Jonze and Mary Wigmore shot the footage.

== Critical reception ==
=== Reviews ===
Professional ratings
Aggregate scores
Source	Rating
AnyDecentMusic?	5.2/10
Metacritic	58/100
Review scores
Source	Rating
AllMusic	3.5/5 stars
Clash	8/10
The Daily Telegraph	3/5 stars
The Guardian	3/5 stars
The Independent	1/5 stars
NME	4/5 stars
Pitchfork	6.0/10
Rolling Stone	3.5/5 stars
The Standard	3/5 stars
The Times	3/5 stars

Moon Music received generally mixed reviews from music critics. At Metacritic, which assigns a normalised rating out of 100 to reviews from mainstream critics, the album has an average score of 58 based on 13 reviews, which indicates "mixed or average reviews". In a four-star review for NME, Rhian Daily wrote it "gently and subtly distils that spirit of weathering any storm, going on a journey from that bleak opening moment to a more accepting, happier ending". She also commented that both the lyrical and musical choices suggest an expression of resilience, as the "fake-outs don't just keep you guessing but mirror that feeling of having exhausted all your options, only for you to find the strength to push forward".

Clash's Emma Harrison described Moon Music as "the band's most expansive and intriguing album to date", feeling "like the best friend who helps you through the dark hours". Jon Dolan from Rolling Stone praised its musical range and stated there "is only 10 songs, but it's a lot, and that's the idea—the pop-rock LP as social, psychological, and metaphysical cold-plunge". Hannah Jocelyn told Pitchfork the record has "all the reasons to be sick of Coldplay" but also "all the reasons they'll be missed when they retire". She criticised the lyrics for not exploring sentiments with enough depth and the frequent use of sing-alongs, such as on "All My Love", but noted that "for every questionable choice, there's a 6-minute nu-jazz vamp ['Arabesque'] or classical prog-pop opus ['Coloratura'] waiting around the corner. Only Coldplay would make a song called '🌈', but only Coldplay would make it the record's most beautiful and exploratory song, too".

Ben Beaumont-Thomas of The Guardian agreed with the sentiment, saying "Their 10th album has epic songs that make you feel like you've climbed Everest—but they're undermined by corny lyrics". Neil Z. Yeung of AllMusic rated Moon Music three and a half stars out of five, opining that "Like so many of their recent efforts, it's a lot to take on: the freeform snapshots and contemplative experimentation recall the scrapbook approach of Everyday Life, while at its poppiest, Moon Music returns listeners to A Head Full of Dreams and Music of the Spheres. As a sibling set, [...] it does feel like a B-sides, here's-what's-left collection at times, for better or worse". The Standard's El Hunt said that the album retreads "all-too-familiar themes to an uneven soundtrack".

=== Rankings ===
List of critic rankings
Publication	Description	Result	Ref.
Amazon Music	Top Albums of 2024	Placed	
El Nacional	The 24 Best Albums of 2024	8	
KRVM-FM	The Year in Music 2024	Placed	
Los 40	The Best Albums of 2024	Placed	
Panorama	The 40 Best International Albums of 2024	30	
Phoenix FM	The 32 Best Albums of 2024	Placed	
Radio X	The 25 Best Albums of 2024	7	

== Accolades ==
List of awards and nominations
Year	Ceremony	Category	Result	Ref.
2025	Clio Awards	Design – Sustainability	Gold	
2025	Los 40 Music Awards	Best International Album	Nominated	
2025	Digiday Media Awards	Best Gaming/Esports Brand Activation (with Roblox)	Won	
2025	Digiday Media Awards	Best Use of Emerging Tech (with Roblox)	Nominated	
2025	Music Week Awards	Music & Brand Partnership (with FC Barcelona)	Nominated	
2025	Shorty Awards	Industry – Gaming (with iHeartMedia)	Honoree	
2025	Shorty Awards	Platforms & Technology – Interactive Content (with iHeartMedia)	Nominated	
2025	Shorty Awards	Platforms & Technology – Immersive (with Roblox)	Nominated	
2026	Clio Awards	Experience/Activation – Immersive/New Realities (with Roblox)	Silver	
2026	Clio Awards	Experience/Activation – Immersive/New Realities (with Lightroom)	Bronze	

== Commercial performance ==
Moon Music reached number one in 16 countries, selling over 500,000 copies in its first week worldwide. It debuted atop the UK Albums Chart with 236,796 units, becoming Coldplay's 10th chart-topper, their fastest-selling release since Viva la Vida or Death and All His Friends (2008), and the best rollout for a group since Midnight Memories (2013) by One Direction, which moved 237,338 copies. They became the sixth band in history to secure 10 number-one records, following the Beatles, the Rolling Stones, U2, ABBA and Queen. The album also had the largest debut for a British act since Adele's 30 (2021), outselling the rest of the Top 40 combined and becoming the ninth biggest release of the year in Britain. The Official Charts Company ranked it as the fastest-selling CD of the decade.

In Germany, Italy, Sweden, and the United States, Moon Music became the band's first number-one album since Ghost Stories (2014). It sold 120,000 equivalent units on the Billboard 200, their best debut in American territory since A Head Full of Dreams (2015). Coldplay also topped the Artist 100 ranking for the first time ever. By scoring a fifth number-one project, they became the British musicians with the most 21st century chart leaders stateside.

Additionally, Moon Music was the first time a British group topped the United Kingdom and United States album charts simultaneously since the 1975 with I Like It When You Sleep, for You Are So Beautiful yet So Unaware of It (2016). Despite opening at number two in Australia, the record went number one in the following month. It ruled the ARIA Top 20 Vinyl Albums chart as well, becoming Coldplay's second release to achieve the feat. In France, it reached number three with 19,213 units, outselling chart-topper Music of the Spheres (2021). The album was also their first weekly best-seller since Viva la Vida or Death and All His Friends (2008) in Austria. Multiple songs appeared on South Korea's Circle Download and Circle BGM charts, including the non-single track "Good Feelings". In Japan, the album debuted at number 15 with 3,028 physical copies sold.

== Impact ==
Mark Savage from the BBC said that, along with the Music of the Spheres World Tour (2022–2025), Moon Music's recycled physical copies put Coldplay "at the forefront of the move to make rock music more sustainable". Spin's Jordan Bassett agreed, commenting that the band are helping to boost demand for eco-friendly vinyls and make them more widely adopted. Craig Evans from Blood Records called their initiative "monumental". Music Week reported that the album had the largest CD sales of 2024 in Britain. It also won a Gold prize at the Clio Awards for its sustainable design. Coldplay re-issued their discography in recycled vinyl due to the positive reception afterwards.

Visits to San Juan's Valle de la Luna region triplicated after the location was chosen for an exclusive listening event promoting Moon Music. Danni Scott from Metro stated that the band are reinventing the music video genre for a modern age on the album's visualiser, A Film for the Future. She then concluded they might bring back the attention to visuals in the music industry, praising the project as "an incredibly smart move" in "the age of fried attention spans", as it constantly changes to keep the audience engaged. Discussing how Moon Music outsold Coldplay's two previous records upon release on Billboard, Kyle Denis argued they became "a legacy act that can still corral fans to buy new material".

== Track listing ==
Coldplay's songwriting members are Guy Berryman, Jonny Buckland, Will Champion and Chris Martin. Credits adapted from liner notes.

Moon Music – standard edition track listing
No.	Title	Writer(s)	Producer(s)	Length
1.	"Moon Music" (with Jon Hopkins)	Coldplay; Hopkins	Bill Rahko; Dan Green; Hopkins; Max Martin	4:36
2.	"Feelslikeimfallinginlove"	Coldplay; Hopkins; Max Martin; Oscar Holter; Apple Martin; Tim Rutili	Rahko; Green; Max Martin; Michael Ilbert; Holter	3:56
3.	"We Pray" (with Little Simz, Burna Boy, Elyanna and Tini)	Coldplay; Simbiatu Ajikawo; Shawn Carter; Elian Marjieh; Max Martin; Damini Ogulu; Ilya Salmanzadeh; Martina Stoessel	Rahko; Green; Ilya; Max Martin; Ilbert	3:53
4.	"Jupiter"	Coldplay; Max Martin; Salmanzadeh; Jacob Collier; Olivia Waithe; Moses Martin; Orlando le Fleming	Rahko; Green; Ilya; Max Martin; Ilbert; Stargate^{[a]}	4:00
5.	"Good Feelings" (with Ayra Starr)	Coldplay; Oyinkansola Aderibigbe; Alex Pall; Andrew Taggart; Nile Rodgers	Rahko; Green; Max Martin; Ilbert; Holter; The Chainsmokers; Hopkins^{[a]}; Tate McDowell^{[a]}	3:37
6.	"Alien Hits / Alien Radio"	Coldplay; Hopkins; Devin Powers; Maya Angelou; Kaori Muraji	Rahko; Green; Hopkins; Max Martin; Ilbert	6:09
7.	"IAAM"	Coldplay; Holter; Max Martin	Rahko; Green; Max Martin; Ilbert; Holter; Hopkins^{[a]}	3:03
8.	"Aeterna"	Coldplay; Louis Cole; Green; Hopkins; José Velazquez	Rahko; Green; Hopkins; Max Martin; Ilbert; BabeTruth^{[a]}	4:13
9.	"All My Love"	Coldplay; Moses Martin	Rahko; Green; Ilya; Max Martin; Ilbert; Holter	3:42
10.	"One World"	Coldplay; Denise Carite; Brian Eno; Shaneka Hamilton; A. Martin; John Metcalfe; Rahko	Rahko; Green; Max Martin; Ilbert	6:47
Total length:				43:57

Notes

- ^{^[a]} signifies an additional producer.
- The Apple Music edition additionally includes the trailer for A Film for the Future (0:24).
- The Notebook edition additionally includes a voice memo for each song, showing their development during the writing process.
- With exception of "Feelslikeimfallinginlove", all tracks are stylised in uppercase, though the letter "i" remains in lowercase. "Feelslikeimfallinginlove" is stylised in all lowercase.
- "Alien Hits / Alien Radio" is stylised as "", and is a suite containing the tracks "Neon Forest", "Alien Hits / Alien Radio: Opus 5" and "Angelsong". (Note: These are the tracks which are credited in the liner notes. The lyric booklet for Moon Music denotes seven individual parts: "The Karate Kid", "Neon Forest", "Sunshine", "Opus 5" (with Kaori Muraji), "Man in the Moon", "M.U.S.I.C." and "Angelsong".)
- "IAAM" is an abbreviation for "I Am a Mountain".
- "One World" ends at 5:07. An "unnamed melody" (co-written by Apple Martin) plays starting from 5:25.
- The Christmas Moon edition (exclusive to Tidal) appends the non-album single "Christmas Lights" (4:08).

Sample credits

- "Moon Music" contains an excerpt of "Forever Held", written and performed by Jon Hopkins.
- "Feelslikeimfallinginlove" contains a sample of "Funeral Singers", written by Tim Rutili, as performed by Sylvan Esso.
- "Neon Forest" contains a sample of "Drone in C", written by Devin Powers and performed by Sinerider.
- "Angelsong" contains a spoken word sample by Maya Angelou from Oprah's Master Class on Oprah Winfrey Network.
- "Aeterna" contains a sample of "Weird Part of the Night", written and performed by Louis Cole.
- "One World" contains a sample of "Root to Leaf", composed by John Metcalfe, which itself contains an interpolation of "An Ending (Ascent)", written and performed by Brian Eno.

=== Tour edition ===
Includes 10 bonus tracks recorded on the Music of the Spheres World Tour and an 80-page digital booklet. CDs were sold exclusively in the United States for a limited time.

Moon Music – Tour edition bonus tracks
No.	Title	Writer(s)	Length
1.	"Music of the Spheres / Higher Power" (live at River Plate)	Coldplay; Max Martin; Rik Simpson; Green; Federico Vindver; Rahko; Carite
2.	"Adventure of a Lifetime" (live at River Plate)	Coldplay; Stargate
3.	"Viva la Vida" (live at River Plate)	Coldplay
4.	"Let Somebody Go" (live at River Plate; with H.E.R)	Coldplay; Max Martin; A. Martin; Waithe; Holter; Rahko; Leland Wayne
5.	"People of the Pride" (live at River Plate)	Coldplay; Max Martin; Rahko; Derek Dixie; Samuel Falson; Jesse Rogg
6.	"My Universe" (live at River Plate; with BTS)	Coldplay; Max Martin; Holter; Rahko; Suga; J-Hope; RM
7.	"A Sky Full of Stars" (live at River Plate)	Coldplay; Tim Bergling
8.	"Biutyful" (live at River Plate)	Coldplay; Max Martin; Holter; Rossi
9.	"Feelslikeimfallinginlove" (live 2024)	Coldplay; Hopkins; A. Martin; Max Martin; Rutili
10.	"All My Love" (live in Dublin)	Coldplay; Moses Martin; Metcalfe

=== Full Moon edition ===
Includes 10 bonus tracks labelled as "Blue Moons". CDs were sold exclusively in the United States for a limited time.

Moon Music – Full Moon edition bonus tracks
No.	Title	Writer(s)	Producer(s)	Length
1.	"Moon Music (Elodie)"	Coldplay	Rahko	2:46
2.	"Feelslikeimfallinginlive"	Coldplay; Hopkins; A. Martin; Max Martin; Rutili	Rahko; Green; Max Martin; Ilbert; Holter	4:36
3.	"The Karate Kid"	Coldplay; Metcalfe	Rahko; Matty Healy^{[a]}	2:55
4.	"We Pray (Be Our Guest)" (with Little Simz, Burna Boy, Elyanna and Tini)	Coldplay; Ajikawo; Carter; Marjieh; Max Martin; Ogulu; Salmanzadeh; Stoessel	Rahko; Green; Salmanzadeh; Max Martin; Ilbert	3:53
5.	"Angelsong"	Coldplay; Powers; Angelou; Hopkins	Rahko; Green; Hopkins; Ilbert	4:21
6.	"Jupiter" (single version)	Coldplay; Rossi; Salmanzadeh; Collier; Max Martin; Moses Martin; Waithe; Fleming	Rahko; Green; Salmanzadeh; Max Martin; Ilbert; Stargate^{[a]}	2:53
7.	"Man in the Moon"	Coldplay; Max Martin; Holter	Rahko; Green; Max Martin; Ilbert; Holter	3:54
8.	"I Am a Mountain"	Coldplay; Holter; Max Martin	Rahko	3:06
9.	"All My Love" (live in Dublin)	Coldplay; Moses Martin; Metcalfe	Rahko; Green; Salmanzadeh; Max Martin; Ilbert; Holter	4:06
10.	"A Wave" (with Jon Hopkins)	Coldplay; Hopkins	Rahko; Hopkins; Ilbert	2:33
Total length:				79:00

Notes

- "Moon Music (Elodie)" is an instrumental piano version of "Moon Music", omitting the orchestral introduction.
- "Feelslikeimfallinginlive" is a live version of "Feelslikeimfallinginlove", following the same stylisation.
- "We Pray (Be Our Guest)" features a blank second verse "for your own inspiration", according to the band. It was labelled as "? Version" on the single release.
- "I Am a Mountain" is an acoustic version of "IAAM".
- "A Wave" is stylised as "".

== Personnel ==
Coldplay

- Guy Berryman – bass guitar (tracks 1–5, 7–10), bells (4), mandolin (7)
- Jonny Buckland – guitar (tracks 1–5, 7–10), additional vocals (10)
- Will Champion – percussion (tracks 1–3, 6, 8, 9), drums (2–5, 7–10), backing vocals (2, 7, 9), vocals (6), guitar (7), programming (8), Omnichord synthesizer (9)
- Chris Martin – vocals (all tracks), keyboards (tracks 1–8, 10), piano (1, 3, 5–7, 9, 10), guitar (2, 4–7, 9), percussion (4)
- Phil Harvey

Additional musicians

- Dan Green – programming (tracks 1–5, 8, 9), keyboards (2, 8, 9), synthesizer (3)
- Bill Rahko – programming (tracks 1–3), keyboards (4)
- Max Martin – programming (tracks 1, 2, 5–7, 9), keyboards (2, 4–9), percussion (2, 3), piano (3)
- Jon Hopkins – programming (tracks 1, 2, 6, 7), keyboards (1, 6, 7), synthesizer (2)
- Chris Worsey – cello (tracks 1, 2, 9)
- Tony Wollard – cello (tracks 1, 2, 9)
- Vicky Matthews – cello (tracks 1, 2, 9)
- Helen Kamminga – viola (tracks 1, 2, 9)
- Everton Nelson – violin (tracks 1, 2, 9)
- Ian Humphries – violin (tracks 1, 2, 9)
- Kate Robinson – violin (tracks 1, 2, 9)
- Louisa Fuller – violin (tracks 1, 2, 9)
- Marianna Haynes – violin (tracks 1, 2, 9)
- Richard George – violin (tracks 1, 2, 9)
- James Douglas – cello (track 1), strings (3)
- Patrick Kiernan – violin (track 1), strings (3)
- Daisy Vatalaro – cello (track 1)
- Will Schofield – cello (track 1)
- Chris Laurence – double bass (track 1)
- Stacey Walton – double bass (track 1)
- John Metcalfe – strings arrangement (tracks 1, 2, 9)
- Jenny Goshawk – strings orchestration (track 1)
- Susie Gillis – strings orchestration (track 1)
- Ólafur Arnalds – strings programming (track 1)
- Kate Musker – viola (track 1)
- Peter Lale – viola (track 1)
- Reiad Chibah – viola (track 1)
- Alison Dods – violin (track 1)
- Cathy Thompson – violin (track 1)
- Raja Halder – violin (track 1)
- Rick Koster – violin (track 1)
- Sarah Daramy-Williams – violin (track 1)
- Oscar Holter – programming (tracks 2, 5, 7, 9), keyboards (2, 7)
- Bruce White – viola (tracks 2, 9), strings (3)
- Michael Ilbert – programming (tracks 2, 8)
- Ian Burdge – cello (tracks 2, 9)
- Rik Simpson – keyboards (track 2)
- Davide Rossi – cello, contrabassoon, viola, violin (track 3); strings (4)
- Ilya Salmanzadeh – percussion, programming (tracks 3, 4, 9); keyboards (3, 9)
- Bryony James – strings (track 3)
- Charles Jenson – strings (track 3)
- Ellie Stanford – strings (track 3)
- Emma Owens – strings (track 3)
- Hetty Snell – strings (track 3)
- Jenny Sacha – strings (track 3)
- Jessie Ann Richardson – strings (track 3)
- Jordan Bergmans – strings (track 3)
- Kerenza Peacock – strings (track 3)
- Martyn Jackson – strings (track 3)
- Meghan Cassidy – strings (track 3)
- Michael Trainor – strings (track 3)
- Miles Brett – strings (track 3)
- Natalia Bonner – strings (track 3)
- Natalie Klouda – strings (track 3)
- Richard Pryce – strings (track 3)
- Rosie Danvers – strings (track 3)
- Sarah Sexton – strings (track 3)
- Stephen Morris – strings (track 3)
- Tony Woollard – strings (track 3)
- Victoria Harrild – strings (track 3)
- Zahra Benyounes – strings (track 3)
- Davide Rossi – strings arrangement (tracks 3, 4)
- Mattias Bylund – strings, string synthesizer, violin (track 4)
- Mikkel Eriksen – keyboards (track 4)
- Tor Hermansen – keyboards (track 4)
- Alison Martin – oboe (track 4)
- Orlando le Fleming – upright bass (track 4)
- Erik Arvinder – violin (track 4)
- Alex Pall – keyboards, programming (track 5)
- Drew Taggart – keyboards, programming (track 5)
- Bateria Vanguarda – percussion, sound effects (track 5)
- David Bukovinszky – cello (track 4)
- Nile Rodgers – guitar (track 5)
- Kaori Muraji – classical guitar (track 6)
- BabeTruth – keyboards (track 8)
- Brian Eno – keyboards, programming (track 10)

Additional vocalists

- Apple Martin – backing vocals (track 2)
- Burna Boy – vocals (track 3)
- Little Simz – vocals (track 3)
- Elyanna – vocals (track 3)
- Tini – vocals (track 3)
- Victoria Canal – backing vocals (tracks 4, 6)
- H.E.R. – backing vocals (tracks 4, 9)
- Jacob Collier – backing vocals (track 4)
- Livvi Franc – backing vocals (track 4)
- Lous and the Yakuza – backing vocals (track 4)
- Moses Martin – backing vocals (track 4)
- Ayra Starr – vocals (track 5)
- Maya Angelou – voice (track 6)
- Brian Eno – additional vocals (track 10)
- Bill Rahko – additional vocals (tracks 5, 7)
- Love Choir – choir arrangement and performance (tracks 3, 4, 5, 8, 10)
  - Denise Carite – choir vocals (tracks 4, 5), vocals (10)
  - Dorian Holley – choir vocals (tracks 4, 5), vocals (10)
  - Neka Hamilton – choir vocals (tracks 4, 5), vocals (10)
  - Stevie Mackey – choir vocals (tracks 4, 5), vocals (10)
- Brandon Winbush – choir vocals (tracks 4, 5), vocals (10)
- Sharlotte Gibson – choir vocals (tracks 4, 5), vocals (10)
- Toni Scruggs – choir vocals (tracks 4, 5), vocals (10)
- Mzansi Youth Choir – backing vocals (track 4)
- Antonio Sol – choir vocals (track 4)
- Baraka May Williams – choir vocals (track 4)
- David Loucks – choir vocals (track 4)
- Jarrett Johnson – choir vocals (track 4)
- Nelson Beato – choir vocals (track 4)
- Tim Crompton – additional vocals (track 7)
- Alice Backham – additional vocals (track 10)
- Arlene Moon – additional vocals (track 10)
- Byron Schwartz – additional vocals (track 10)
- Connor Panayi – additional vocals (track 10)
- Duncan Fuller – additional vocals (track 10)
- Eme Boucher – additional vocals (track 10)
- Emma Jane Randall – additional vocals (track 10)
- Gili Portal – additional vocals (track 10)
- Jessie Collins – additional vocals (track 10)
- Kordian Moskala – additional vocals (track 10)
- Kylie Morris – additional vocals (track 10)
- Marguerite Nguyen – additional vocals (track 10)
- Nick Gibbons – additional vocals (track 10)
- Sam Button – additional vocals (track 10)
- Tegan Nicholls – additional vocals (track 10)
- Thomas Fletcher – additional vocals (track 10)
- Tomas Crow – additional vocals (track 10)
- Valeska Voiges – additional vocals (track 10)

Technical

- Randy Merrill – mastering
- Michael Ilbert – mixing (all tracks), engineering (tracks 1, 3–10)
- Dan Green – engineering
- Bill Rahko – engineering (tracks 1, 3–10)
- Joe Nino-Hernes – engineering (tracks 1, 6, 9, 10)
- Tate McDowell – engineering (track 1), additional mixing (6), additional engineering (2–4), engineering assistance (7–10)
- Rik Simpson – engineering (track 1), additional engineering (2)
- Jake Jackson – engineering (track 3)
- Rebecca Horden – engineering (track 3)
- Mattias Bylund – strings engineering, strings arrangement (track 4)
- Peter Chilvers – vocal engineering, additional engineering (track 10)
- Niamh O'Sullivan – additional engineering (track 2), engineering assistance (3–5, 9, 10)
- Johnny Drill – additional engineering (track 5)
- Gianluca Massimo – additional engineering (track 7), engineering assistance (1–6, 9, 10)
- Eric Eylands – engineering assistance
- Tomas Crow – engineering assistance (tracks 1–5, 7, 8–10)
- Matt Latham – engineering assistance (tracks 1, 2, 4, 6–8)
- Kai Fujita – engineering assistance (tracks 1, 6)
- Eugene Takino – engineering assistance (tracks 1, 6)
- Bernd Pfeffer – engineering assistance (track 1)
- Emma Marks – engineering assistance (track 1)
- Lewis Jones – engineering assistance (track 1)
- Matt Cooke – engineering assistance (track 1)
- Nils Hahmann – engineering assistance (track 1)
- Ulli Schiller – engineering assistance (track 1)
- Jed Rimmell – engineering assistance (tracks 2–7, 9, 10)
- Wil Jones – engineering assistance (tracks 2–7, 9, 10)
- Fran Edwards – engineering assistance (tracks 2–5, 7, 9, 10)
- Miguel Lara – engineering assistance (tracks 2, 3, 5, 7, 8)
- Bella Corich – engineering assistance (tracks 2, 3, 7, 8)
- Maxx Iwamasa – engineering assistance (tracks 2, 3, 7, 8)
- Austin Brown – engineering assistance (tracks 2, 4, 7, 9, 10)
- Tandra "MixedByLytes" Jhagroo – engineering assistance (tracks 2, 4, 9)
- Timothy Kahwa – engineering assistance (tracks 2, 4, 9)
- Sam Holland – engineering assistance (tracks 2, 5, 7, 9)
- Ettore Gilardoni – engineering assistance (track 2)
- Roberto Gramegna – engineering assistance (track 2)
- Ashley Poh – engineering assistance (track 3)
- Bryant Tan – engineering assistance (track 3)
- Leonard Soosay – engineering assistance (track 3)
- Rennie Gomes – engineering assistance (track 3)
- Connor Panayi – engineering assistance (tracks 4, 5, 8, 10)
- Duncan Fuller – engineering assistance (tracks 4, 5, 8, 10)
- Braden Bursteen – engineering assistance (track 4)
- Bradley Post – engineering assistance (track 4)
- David Pac Urresta – engineering assistance (track 4)
- Eva Reistad – engineering assistance (track 4)
- Mark Aguilar – engineering assistance (track 4)
- Navneeth Balachanderan – engineering assistance (track 4)
- Kian Moghaddamzadeh – engineering assistance (track 5)
- Simon Salabim – engineering assistance (track 5)
- Kalle Gustafsson Jerneholm – engineering assistance (tracks 6, 9)
- Aleks Von Korff – engineering assistance (track 7)
- Nick Valentin – engineering assistance (track 8)
- Eve Morris – engineering assistance (track 9)
- John Metcalfe – strings arrangement (tracks 1, 9, 10)
- Davide Rossi – strings arrangement (tracks 3, 4)

Visual

- Matias Alonso Revelli – album cover photography
- Pilar Zeta – art design
- Victor Scorrano – assistance

== Charts ==
=== Weekly charts ===
Weekly chart performance
Chart (2024)	Peak position
Argentine Albums (CAPIF)	10
Australian Albums (ARIA)	1
Austrian Albums (Ö3 Austria)	1
Belgian Albums (Ultratop Flanders)	1
Belgian Albums (Ultratop Wallonia)	1
Canadian Albums (Billboard)	2
Croatian International Albums (HDU)	1
Czech Albums (ČNS IFPI)	2
Danish Albums (Hitlisten)	2
Dutch Albums (Album Top 100)	1
Finnish Albums (Suomen virallinen lista)	2
French Albums (SNEP)	3
German Albums (Offizielle Top 100)	1
Greek Albums (IFPI)	16
Hong Kong Albums (HKRMA)	3
Hungarian Albums (MAHASZ)	3
Icelandic Albums (Tónlistinn)	7
Irish Albums (Official Charts)	1
Italian Albums (FIMI)	1
Japanese Albums (Oricon)	15
Japanese Combined Albums (Oricon)	26
Japanese Hot Albums (Billboard Japan)	11
Lithuanian Albums (AGATA)	7
New Zealand Albums (RMNZ)	2
Norwegian Albums (VG-lista)	1
Polish Albums (ZPAV)	4
Portuguese Albums (AFP)	1
Scottish Albums (Official Charts)	1
Slovak Albums (ČNS IFPI)	4
South Korean Retail Albums (Circle)	95
Spanish Albums (Promusicae)	1
Swedish Albums (Sverigetopplistan)	1
Swiss Albums (Schweizer Hitparade)	1
Taiwanese Albums (Five Music)	5
UK Albums (Official Charts)	1
US Billboard 200	1
US Top Rock & Alternative Albums (Billboard)	1

=== Monthly charts ===
Monthly chart performance
Chart (2024)	Peak position
Czech Albums (ČNS IFPI)	25
Japanese Albums (Oricon)	47
Slovak Albums (ČNS IFPI)	20

=== Year-end charts ===
Year-end chart performance
Chart (2024)	Position
Australian Albums (ARIA)	97
Austrian Albums (Ö3 Austria)	6
Belgian Albums (Ultratop Flanders)	47
Belgian Albums (Ultratop Wallonia)	49
Dutch Albums (Album Top 100)	23
French Albums (SNEP)	61
German Albums (Offizielle Top 100)	28
Hungarian Physical Albums (MAHASZ)	28
Italian Albums (FIMI)	88
Portuguese Albums (AFP)	59
Spanish Albums (Promusicae)	40
Swedish Physical Albums (Sverigetopplistan)	24
Swiss Albums (Schweizer Hitparade)	4
UK Albums (OCC)	9
US Top Alternative Albums (Billboard)	34
US Top Rock Albums (Billboard)	37

Chart (2025)	Position
French Albums (SNEP)	112
Top Canadian Album Sales (Billboard)	99

== Certifications and sales ==
Certifications and sales
Region	Certification	Certified units/sales
Austria (IFPI Austria)	Gold	7,500^{‡}
France (SNEP)	Platinum	100,000^{‡}
Germany (BVMI)	Gold	75,000^{‡}
Italy (FIMI)	Gold	25,000^{‡}
Japan	—	7,180 (Note: Japanese physical sales for Moon Music as of December 2024.)
New Zealand (RMNZ)	Gold	7,500^{‡}
Spain (Promusicae)	Gold	20,000^{‡}
United Kingdom (BPI)	Platinum	300,000^{‡}
^{‡} Sales+streaming figures based on certification alone.

== Release history ==
Release history and formats
Region	Date	Format	Version	Label	Ref.
Various	4 October 2024	CD · 5×LP · digital download · streaming	Standard	Parlophone · Atlantic · Warner Music	
Various	4 October 2024	CD · LP+CD · digital download	Notebook	Parlophone · Atlantic · Warner Music	
Various	4 October 2024	CD · digital download	Tour	Parlophone · Atlantic · Warner Music	
Various	6 October 2024	CD · digital download · streaming	Full Moon	Parlophone · Atlantic · Warner Music	

== See also ==
- 2024 in British music
- List of number-one albums in Norway
- List of Billboard 200 number-one albums of 2024
- List of number-one albums of 2024 (Australia)
- List of number-one albums of 2024 (Belgium)
- List of number-one albums of 2024 (Ireland)
- List of number-one albums of 2024 (Portugal)
- List of number-one albums of 2024 (Spain)
- List of number-one hits of 2024 (Austria)
- List of number-one hits of 2024 (Germany)
- List of number-one hits of 2024 (Italy)
- List of number-one hits of 2024 (Sweden)
- List of number-one hits of 2024 (Switzerland)
- List of UK Albums Chart number ones of the 2020s
