= We Pray =

2024 single by Coldplay featuring Little Simz, Burna Boy, Elyanna and Tini

Single by Coldplay featuring Little Simz, Burna Boy, Elyanna and Tini

from the album Moon Music
- Language: English; Arabic; Spanish
- Released: 23 August 2024
- Recorded: 2023–2024
- Genre: Alternative hip hop
- Length: 3:53 (album version); 4:07 (Twice version)
- Label: Parlophone; Atlantic
- Songwriters: Guy Berryman; Jonny Buckland; Will Champion; Chris Martin; Simbiatu Ajikawo; Shawn Carter; Elian Marjieh; Max Martin; Damini Ogulu; Ilya Salmanzadeh; Martina Stoessel
- Producers: Max Martin; Daniel Green; Michael Ilbert; Ilya; Bill Rahko

Coldplay singles chronology
"Feelslikeim fallinginlove" (2024)	"We Pray" (2024)	"All My Love" (2024)

Little Simz singles chronology
"Satellite Business 2.0" (2024)	"We Pray" (2024)	"Black and British" (2024)

Burna Boy singles chronology
"Higher" (2024)	"We Pray" (2024)	"Bundle by Bundle" (2024)

Elyanna singles chronology
"Wala Ghalta" (2024)	"We Pray" (2024)	"Yabn el Eh" (2024)

Tini singles chronology
"Agua" (2024)	"We Pray" (2024)	"El Cielo" (2024)

Audio video
- "We Pray" on YouTube

"We Pray" (stylised in all caps) is a song by British rock band Coldplay featuring English rapper Little Simz, Nigerian singer Burna Boy, Palestinian-Chilean musician Elyanna and Argentine singer Tini. It was released on 23 August 2024 through Parlophone in the United Kingdom and Atlantic in the United States, being the second single from their tenth studio album, Moon Music. Spanish and Arabic versions, featuring Tini and Elyanna as guests, were released in September 2024.

The song received positive reviews from music critics. Commercially, it reached the top 10 in Croatia, Ireland, Lebanon, New Zealand and Poland; the top 20 in Belgium and the United Kingdom; and the top 40 in Argentina, Austria, Finland, Germany, the Netherlands and Switzerland. "We Pray" debuted at number 87 on the Billboard Hot 100 as well, becoming Little Simz, Elyanna and Tini's first entry on the chart. Coldplay performed the song on their Music of the Spheres World Tour and on Saturday Night Live.

== Background and release ==
Following the live debut of the song with Little Simz at Coldplay's Glastonbury Festival set in June 2024, Variety reported that Burna Boy "has a verse" while Elyanna "assisted with vocals". The magazine further wrote that the chorus "prominently" contains the lyrics "and so we pray". Variety and NME stated the song's rumored title as "Supernova" while Vulture speculated it was titled "We Pray". The collaboration was confirmed to be a track from the band's upcoming tenth studio album, Moon Music (2024).

On 6 August, the band announced "We Pray" via their social media as the second single from their tenth studio album, Moon Music, along with its release date. Shortly after, a 30-second preview of the song—containing "part of [Little Simz's] (verse) and Chris Martin singing the chorus"—was uploaded to their YouTube channel. Another preview of Martin's verses being recorded in the studio was released as well.

"We Pray" was released for download and to streaming services on 23 August 2024. "We Pray" was also issued via 12-inch recycled vinyl and eco CD—a CD majorly made of recycled polycarbonate—formats. The physical release contains four alternative versions of the song, including separate versions featuring Tini's guest vocals in Spanish and Elyanna's in Arabic, and an exclusive live rendition of the Glastonbury performance. The version featuring Tini was released digitally and for streaming on 6 September, followed by Elyanna's on 20 September. A special titled Coldplay x Tini: An Argentine Connection was released on Argentine streaming service Flow; it details the relationship of the band with its Argentine fans, collaborating with Tini, and the artists' performance of the song in Dublin on Coldplay's tour. Coldplay released a Jasleen Royal version of "We Pray" on 13 February 2025, and a Twice version on 17 April.

== Composition and recording ==
"We Pray" is an alternative hip hop song, comprising "hip-hop beat[s] [...] auditory layers composed of percussion loops, bass hits, and ad-libs". Its lyrical themes revolve around "prayer, religion, love, and freedom" and "[address] the worldwide grievances and injustices surrounding these themes".

In an interview, Martin described how the song came about: "In Taiwan, in the middle of the night, I woke up and the song was in my head, and I don't know where it came from. So the sound of it sort of dictated itself and that's all. I just sort of followed the road map that it said". He stated that the song is "about all of these conflicts and people that hate each other. We're all praying for the same things, and we'd probably all get along if you just sat down long enough. I think that was the field into which it landed, and then it felt very natural". Regarding the inclusion of collaborators from four different regions and cultures, Martin said it "felt like it's a song about different types of people, so we should have different types of people singing it".

Martin revealed that he invited Tini to be part of the song after he "dreamed that [he] was outside a theater in Argentina and Tini was singing inside. That melody [he] heard in [his] dream was the perfect ending for 'We Pray'". Tini revealed that she recorded her parts for the song in April 2023, which she had teased at the time of recording; she described Martin as an artist "[she] admire[s] so much".

== Critical reception ==
Aaron Williams from Uproxx praised the song as an "operatic, epic-sounding anthem that finds [Coldplay and guest artists] reflecting on their hopes for the future and fears of the present, manifesting greatness amid adversity". HotNewHipHop's Elias Andrews appreciated the collaborative nature of the track, set on "a warbling bass line underneath and a massive string section". Ranking "We Pray" as one of the best releases of the week, New Zealand Listener called it "a life affirming chunk of memorable, lyrically catch-all pop which touches a lot of musical bases". Phoenix FM, and Premier Christianity listed the song among the best of 2024.

== Live performances ==
Coldplay debuted the song during their Glastonbury Festival set on 29 June 2024. Little Simz and Elyanna joined them onstage, while short clips of Burna Boy's verses were screened in the background. The first performance with all collaborators was held at Coldplay's first Croke Park, Dublin show of their tour on 29 August 2024. At Croke Park, Tini debuted her Spanish-language version of the track, ahead of its 6 September release. A day before, however, they reunited to perform the track and record a music video, surrounded by fans, at Grafton Street. As the musical guest of the 5 October 2024 episode of Saturday Night Live, Coldplay performed Moon Music's third single "All My Love", followed by "We Pray" with Tini and Elyanna "as colorful neon visuals flashed in the background".

An intimate SiriusXM concert was held on 7 October to promote the album, at the Music Hall of Williamsburg in Brooklyn, wherein the band performed "We Pray" with Elyanna and Tini to an audience of "600-or-so" people. It aired on Coldplay's Sirius XM radio station and Alt Nation. The day after, the three acts performed the song again on Today.

== Track listing ==
Digital download and streaming track listing
No.	Title	Length
1.	"We Pray" (single version)	3:53

CD and 12" track listing
No.	Title	Length
1.	"We Pray" (album version)	3:54
2.	"We Pray" (Tini version)	3:53
3.	"We Pray" (Elyanna version)	3:53
4.	"We Pray" (? version)	3:53
5.	"We Pray" (live at Glastonbury Festival 2024)	4:20

Notes

- The "?" version features a blank second verse "for your own inspiration", according to the band. It was labelled as "Be Our Guest" on the streaming release.

== Personnel ==
Credits adapted from the CD single liner notes.

Band members

- Guy Berryman – bass, songwriter
- Jonny Buckland – guitar, songwriter
- Will Champion – drums, percussion, songwriter
- Chris Martin – vocals, keyboards, piano, songwriter

Additional personnel

- Bill Rahko – producer, programmer
- Daniel Green – producer, programmer, synthesiser
- Ilya Salmanzadeh – producer, keyboards, percussion, programmer
- Max Martin – producer, percussion, piano
- Michael Ilbert – producer, mixer
- Randy Merrill – masterer
- Davide Rossi – string arranger

Additional vocals

- Little Simz
- Burna Boy
- Elyanna
- Tini
- Denise Carite
- Dorian Holley
- Jarrett Johnson
- Kara Britz
- Nayanna Holley
- Neka Hamilton
- Nelson Beato
- Stevie Mackey

Strings

- Bruce White
- Bryony James
- Charles Jenson
- Ellie Stanford
- Emma Owens
- Hetty Snell
- James Douglas
- Jenny Sacha
- Jessie Ann Richardson
- Jordan Bergmans
- Kerenza Peacock
- Martyn Jackson
- Meghan Cassidy
- Michael Trainor
- Miles Brett
- Natalia Bonner
- Natalie Klouda
- Patrick Kiernan
- Richard Pryce
- Rosie Danvers
- Sarah Sexton
- Stephen Morris
- Tony Woollard
- Victoria Harrild
- Zahra Benyounes

Engineers

- Bill Rahko
- Daniel Green
- Jake Jackson
- Jed Rimell
- Michael Ilbert
- Rebecca Horden

Assistant engineers

- Ashley Poh
- Bella Corich
- Bryant Tan
- Eric Eylands
- Francesca Edwards
- Gianluca Massimo
- Jed Rimell
- Leonard Soosay
- Maxx Iwamasa
- Miguel Lara
- Niamh O'Sullivan
- Rennie Gomes
- Tomas Crow
- Wil Jones

Additional engineer

- Tate McDowell

== Charts ==
=== Weekly charts ===
Weekly chart performance
Chart (2024–2025)	Peak position
Argentina Hot 100 (Billboard)	36
Argentina Airplay (Monitor Latino)	5
Australia Digital Tracks (ARIA)	37
Austria (Ö3 Austria Top 40)	28
Belarus Airplay (TopHit)	5
Belgium (Ultratop 50 Flanders)	9
Belgium (Ultratop 50 Wallonia)	12
Bolivia Airplay (Monitor Latino)	13
Canada Hot 100 (Billboard)	92
CIS Airplay (TopHit)	2
Costa Rica Anglo Airplay (Monitor Latino)	14
Croatia International Airplay (Top lista)	3
Czech Republic Airplay (ČNS IFPI)	2
Estonia Airplay (TopHit)	3
Finland (Suomen virallinen lista)	38
France (SNEP)	45
Germany (GfK)	40
Global 200 (Billboard)	50
Hong Kong (Billboard)	4
Iceland (Tónlistinn)	30
India International (IMI)	20
Ireland (IRMA)	7
Israel International Airplay (Media Forest)	10
Italy (FIMI)	71
Japan Hot Overseas (Billboard Japan)	9
Kazakhstan Airplay (TopHit)	3
Latvia Airplay (LaIPA)	2
Lebanon (Lebanese Top 20)	1
Lithuania Airplay (TopHit)	11
Malta Airplay (Radiomonitor)	1
Moldova Airplay (TopHit)	149
Netherlands (Dutch Top 40)	4
Netherlands (Single Top 100)	30
New Zealand (Recorded Music NZ)	21
Nigeria (TurnTable Top 100)	83
North Macedonia Airplay (Radiomonitor)	4
Panama Airplay (Monitor Latino)	16
Poland (Polish Airplay Top 100)	1
Portugal (AFP)	61
Romania Airplay (Media Forest)	17
Russia Airplay (TopHit)	3
San Marino Airplay (SMRTV Top 50)	4
Serbia Airplay (Radiomonitor)	1
Slovakia Airplay (ČNS IFPI)	1
Slovenia Airplay (Radiomonitor)	5
South Korea BGM (Circle)	95
South Korea Download (Circle)	151
Spain (Promusicae)	53
Suriname (Nationale Top 40)	11
Sweden (Sverigetopplistan)	79
Switzerland (Schweizer Hitparade)	22
Turkey International Airplay (Radiomonitor Türkiye)	4
Ukraine Airplay (TopHit)	3
United Arab Emirates (IFPI)	8
UK Singles (Official Charts)	20
US Billboard Hot 100	87
US Adult Pop Airplay (Billboard)	15
US Hot Rock & Alternative Songs (Billboard)	14
US Pop Airplay (Billboard)	23

Weekly chart performance (Twice version)
Chart (2025)	Peak position
South Korea BGM (Circle)	48
South Korea Download (Circle)	54

=== Monthly charts ===
Monthly chart performance
Chart (2024–2025)	Peak position
Belarus Airplay (TopHit)	7
CIS Airplay (TopHit)	2
Czech Republic (Rádio Top 100)	3
Estonia Airplay (TopHit)	6
Kazakhstan Airplay (TopHit)	3
Lithuania Airplay (TopHit)	8
Paraguay Airplay (SGP)	84
Romania Airplay (TopHit)	62
Russia Airplay (TopHit)	5
Slovakia (Rádio Top 100)	1
Ukraine Airplay (TopHit)	5

=== Year-end charts ===
Year-end chart performance
Chart (2024)	Position
Belgium (Ultratop Flanders)	82
CIS Airplay (TopHit)	63
Estonia Airplay (TopHit)	158
France Airplay (SNEP)	42
Italy Airplay (EarOne)	79
Lithuania Airplay (TopHit)	127
Netherlands (Dutch Top 40)	29
Poland (Polish Airplay Top 100)	87
Russia Airplay (TopHit)	87
UK Vinyl Singles (OCC)	30

Chart (2025)	Position
Argentina Anglo Airplay (Monitor Latino)	23
Belarus Airplay (TopHit)	7
Belgium (Ultratop 50 Flanders)	64
Belgium (Ultratop 50 Wallonia)	66
Canada Hot AC (Billboard)	94
CIS Airplay (TopHit)	15
Estonia Airplay (TopHit)	152
France (SNEP)	197
Germany (GfK)	100
Kazakhstan Airplay (TopHit)	41
Lithuania Airplay (TopHit)	63
Netherlands (Dutch Top 40)	70
Poland (Polish Airplay Top 100)	36
Russia Airplay (TopHit)	28
Ukraine Airplay (FDR)	8
US Hot Rock & Alternative Songs (Billboard)	84

== Certifications ==
Certifications
Region	Certification	Certified units/sales
Australia (ARIA)	Gold	35,000^{‡}
Austria (IFPI Austria)	Gold	15,000^{‡}
France (SNEP)	Platinum	200,000^{‡}
New Zealand (RMNZ)	Gold	15,000^{‡}
Poland (ZPAV)	Platinum	125,000^{‡}
Portugal (AFP)	Gold	5,000^{‡}
Spain (Promusicae)	Platinum	100,000^{‡}
United Kingdom (BPI)	Gold	400,000^{‡}
^{‡} Sales+streaming figures based on certification alone.

== Release history ==
Release dates and formats
Region	Date	Format	Version	Label	Ref.
Italy	23 August 2024	Radio airplay	Original	Warner	
Various	23 August 2024	12-inch; CD; digital download; streaming	Original	Parlophone; Atlantic	
Various	6 September 2024	Digital download; streaming	Tini	Parlophone; Atlantic	
Various	20 September 2024	Digital download; streaming	Elyanna	Parlophone; Atlantic	
Various	13 February 2025	Digital download; streaming	Jasleen Royal	Parlophone; Atlantic	
Various	17 April 2025	Digital download; streaming	Twice	Parlophone; Atlantic	

== See also ==
- List of number-one singles of 2024 (Poland)
- List of top 10 singles in 2024 (France)
- List of top 10 singles in 2024 (Ireland)
- List of number-one songs of the 2020s (Slovakia)
