= All My Love (Coldplay song) =

2024 single by Coldplay

Single by Coldplay

from the album Moon Music
- B-side: "The Karate Kid"
- Released: 4 October 2024
- Genre: Soft rock
- Length: 3:42 (album version); 3:11 (radio edit); 3:14 (Pnau remix)
- Label: Parlophone; Atlantic
- Songwriters: Guy Berryman; Jonny Buckland; Will Champion; Chris Martin; Moses Martin
- Producers: Max Martin; Oscar Holter; Bill Rahko; Daniel Green; Michael Ilbert; Ilya Salmanzadeh

Coldplay singles chronology
"We Pray" (2024)	"All My Love" (2024)

Music video
- "All My Love" on YouTube

"All My Love" (stylised in all caps) is a song by British rock band Coldplay. It was released on 4 October 2024 by Parlophone in the United Kingdom and Atlantic in the United States, serving as the third single from their tenth studio album, Moon Music. Chris Martin has stated it is meant to be the last proper single of the band's career.

== Background and release ==
On 9 June 2024, during the Music of the Spheres World Tour show at the Olympic Stadium in Athens, Greece, the band performed a preview of "All My Love" as "Biutyful" transition. The song was later announced as the final single from their tenth studio album, Moon Music, and from their entire career by Chris Martin in an interview with Rolling Stone:

"All My Love" is really the final Coldplay single. After this, there’s no more singles, because we don’t want to do that. Of all of the songs that have dropped through really quickly, this is maybe the one that I just don’t understand how it happened. I’m so grateful for this song. I don’t know if and when it will connect with who or not, but for me, it’s a really important song. It’s like, after everything we’ve been through, you have all my love. That’s it. That’s how we feel about life and the world and our fans and our critics and everybody. I didn’t really have to do anything on that song. I just played it. I don’t know how to explain that. Even when I’m playing it now, I’m like: "how did that come through?".

== Composition ==
The song was written by all band members, with additional contribution from John Metcalfe and Moses Martin. Production was carried out by Max Martin, Oscar Holter, Bill Rahko, Daniel Green, Michael Ilbert and Ilya Salmanzadeh. It has been described as a piano ballad with Beatlesque sounds, drawing comparisons to works by Elton John as well.

== Music video ==
A lyric video shot on iPhone and directed by Chris Candy was made available on 4 October 2024. It follows Chris Martin's alter ego Nigel Crisp, who buys a set of red balloons and gives them away while passing through the streets of Las Vegas. By evening, he runs out of balloons and sings "All My Love" for karaoke at the Dino's dive bar. The official video is dedicated to American actor Dick Van Dyke, who handled production alongside his wife Arlene Silver. Its director's cut, led by Spike Jonze and Mary Wigmore, came out on 6 December. Coldplay published a shorter version (which credits Crisp as director) on 13 December, celebrating Van Dyke's 99th birthday. The alter ego also makes an appearance on the Pnau remix, which was directed by Candy and released on 27 December.

== Critical reception ==
Emma Harrison from Clash described "All My Love" as a "beautiful piano-driven song that takes inspiration from the likes of Elton John and the Beatles". She also observed that the lyrics fall "slightly on the side of saccharine", but "it works". Paul Grein from Billboard ranked it among Van Dyke's Top 10 Music Moments on his 100th birthday.

== Accolades ==
List of awards and nominations
Year	Ceremony	Category	Result	Ref.
2025	AICP Show	Performance	Won	
2025	Cannes Lions Festival of Creativity	Media/Entertainment	Nominated	
2025	MTV Video Music Awards	Best Rock Video	Won	
2025	RTHK International Pop Poll Awards	Top 10 International Gold Songs	Won	
2026	Art Directors Guild Awards	Short Format & Music Videos (Florencia Martin)	Nominated	

== Charts ==
=== Weekly charts ===
Weekly chart performance
Chart (2024–2025)	Peak position
Australia Digital Tracks (ARIA)	23
Belgium (Ultratop 50 Flanders)	11
Global 200 (Billboard)	156
Iceland (Tónlistinn)	31
Ireland (IRMA)	42
Japan Hot Overseas (Billboard Japan)	10
Lebanon English Airplay (Lebanese Top 20)	20
Malta Airplay (Radiomonitor)	4
Netherlands (Single Top 100)	90
New Zealand Hot Singles (RMNZ)	2
South Korea BGM (Circle)	116
South Korea Download (Circle)	132
Sweden (Sverigetopplistan)	46
Switzerland (Schweizer Hitparade)	49
UK Singles (Official Charts)	43
US Adult Pop Airplay (Billboard)	12
US Hot Rock & Alternative Songs (Billboard)	26

Weekly chart performance (Pnau remix)
Chart (2024–2025)	Peak position
Latvia Airplay (TopHit)	153
New Zealand Hot Singles (RMNZ)	31
Romania Airplay (TopHit)	75

=== Year-end charts ===
Year-end chart performance
Chart (2025)	Position
Iceland (Tónlistinn)	98
US Adult Pop Airplay (Billboard)	41

== Certifications ==
Certifications
Region	Certification	Certified units/sales
United Kingdom (BPI)	Silver	200,000^{‡}
^{‡} Sales+streaming figures based on certification alone.

== Release history ==
Release dates and formats
Region	Date	Format	Version	Label	Ref.
Various	3 October 2024	Digital download; streaming	Radio edit	Parlophone; Atlantic	
Italy	1 November 2024	Radio airplay	Radio edit	Warner Italy	
Various	22 November 2024	Digital download; streaming	Standard	Parlophone; Atlantic	
Various	22 November 2024	Digital download; streaming	Live in Dublin	Parlophone; Atlantic	
Various	22 November 2024	Digital download; streaming	Pnau remix	Parlophone; Atlantic	
Various	27 December 2024	7-inch	Standard	Parlophone; Atlantic	
