= Howling Bells discography =

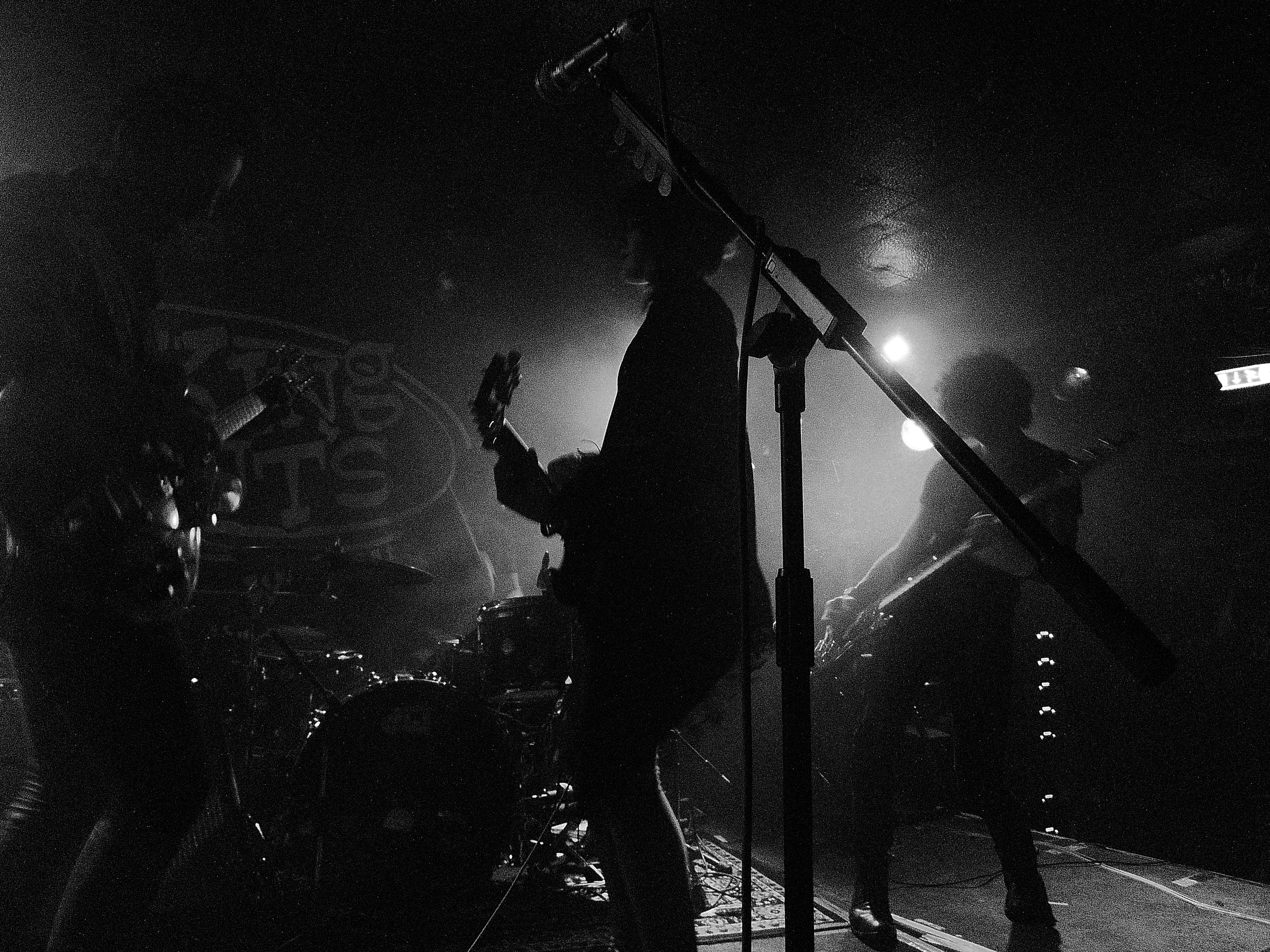
- Howling Bells, King Tut's, Glasgow, June 2014; From left to right: Joel Stein, Glenn Moule, Juanita Stein, Gary Daines
- Studio albums: 4
- Extended plays: 3
- Singles: 12
- Music videos: 13

The discography of Howling Bells, a London-based Australian indie rock band, consists of four studio albums, three extended plays, twelve singles, and thirteen music videos. Formed in Sydney in 2004, the group consists of Juanita Stein (vocals, rhythm guitar), Glenn Moule (drums), Juanita's brother Joel Stein (lead guitar), and Gary Daines (bass guitar). Original Howling Bells bass guitarist, Brendan Picchio, left the band in December 2011.

The band moved to London shortly after its formation and recorded its debut album with regular Coldplay producer, Ken Nelson. Following three singles, Howling Bells released their self-titled debut album Howling Bells (2006), to critical acclaim in the United Kingdom. It charted just inside the Top 100 in that country, and just outside the Top 50 in Australia. Four singles that were released from the album charted outside of the Top 100 in the UK. The band's second album Radio Wars (2009), received mixed reviews and failed to produce a charting single in any country, though the album itself charted higher than its more popular predecessor in both the UK and Australia. Howling Bells' third album The Loudest Engine (2011), was released to mostly positive reviews, but did not perform well on the charts. Their fourth album Heartstrings (2014), failed to chart in any nation.

== Albums ==
=== Studio albums ===
Album title	Album details	Peak chart positions					
Album title	Album details	UK	AUS	CAN	GER	JPN	US
Howling Bells	Released: 8 May 2006; Labels: Bella Union, Liberation; Formats: CD, download	92	53	—	—	—	—
Radio Wars	Released: 2 March 2009; Labels: Independiente, Liberation, PIAS, Hostess, Nettwerk; Formats: CD, download	55	28	—	—	—	—
The Loudest Engine	Released: 9 September 2011; Label: Cooking Vinyl; Formats: CD, download, LP	151	96	—	—	—	—
Heartstrings	Release: 2 June 2014; Label: Birthday Records; Formats: CD, download, LP	—	—	—	—	—	—
"—" denotes release that did not chart or was not released.

=== Extended plays ===
EP title	EP details
Cities Burning Down	Released: 23 February 2009; Label: Independiente; Format: download
Paradiso	Released: 2 March 2009; Label: Independiente; Formats: CD, download
Invisible	Released: 9 May 2011; Label: PledgeMusic; Format: download

== Singles ==
Year	Single	Peak chart positions		Album
Year	Single	UK	AUS	Album
2005	"Low Happening"	—	76	Howling Bells
2006	"Wishing Stone"	101	—	Howling Bells
2006	"Blessed Night"	105	—	Howling Bells
2006	"Setting Sun"	114	—	Howling Bells
2007	"Low Happening"(re-issue)	115	—	Howling Bells
2008	"Into the Chaos"	—	—	Radio Wars
2009	"Cities Burning Down"	—	—	Radio Wars
2009	"Digital Hearts"	—	—	Radio Wars
2011	"Into the Sky"	—	—	The Loudest Engine
2014	"Slowburn"	—	—	Heartstrings
2014	"Your Love"	—	—	Heartstrings
2014	"Original Sin"	—	—	Heartstrings
"—" denotes release that did not chart or was not released.

=== Low Happening ===
Low Happening cover art

"Low Happening" is the debut single from Howling Bells. First released as a digital download in 2005, followed by a CD release in 2006, its next appearance served as the third track on their debut album. Re-issued in 2007 in digital download and CD format once more, as well as vinyl, this time with various remixes by several different artists.

The band's most popular single to date, it was ranked at number 27 in NME's list of the best songs of 2007. Click Music's Donna Dobson called it "one of the most interesting tunes of the year", and "a primal, almost raw, blending of blues with dirty rock 'n' roll". The song was used in an episode of The OC.

==== 2005 (Stage version) ====
The video was directed by Josh Louge for Mathematics and was shot at the Enmore Theatre in Sydney, Australia. DP (Director of Photography) Francesco Biffone was awarded a 2005 silver ACS (Australian Cinematographers Society) Award for Cinematography. Captured on 35 mm film stock, it utilizes an aspect ratio of 1.85:1

It opens to the sight of a clapperboard and complete silence. Next is a stage right to stage left tracking shot from up-stage, behind the band, who at this point have started playing. As a whole the video is shot from a fixed position at a back angle, with a lot of it over the shoulder, and only one instance of it being hand-held. It isn't until the final verse and chorus that we are presented with the band from the front in which a tracking shot is pulling away from them, now playing in a set with a rear projection screen and props designed to mirror a forest.

==== 2007 (Story version) ====
The video was directed by Dan Sully for Rebel Monk and was shot in Camden, London. Sully was nominated for 2008 UK MVA Best New Director. Captured on 35 mm film stock, it utilizes an aspect ratio of 1.85:1

A technique called stop motion was used briefly in the video. There are only a few instances of stable shots with the rest of it being all hand-held. The girl in the video is Lynsey Wright.

The camera scans a room, it's a mess, the walls are clad with nature-scened wallpaper, broken bottles along with a high heel shoe strew the floor. A young woman awakes in a bed, she's wrapped in blinking Christmas lights, her hand clutches burnt out sparklers, she's confused by it all. She gets up to look at herself in the mirror, she sees behind her a young man dressed as a skeleton passed out in the bathtub. She leaves and wanders the streets in and around Camden Lock listening to the song through her headphones, bemused by what she sees. The light in her eye and fast, sweeping motion of the camera gives the impression that she is obviously under the influence. She enters a diner in which members of the band patronize, she orders, attracts attention by swaying and twirling to her music. She sees a man sitting at a table, he's leaned up against the wall incoherent, she twists and plays with his tie only to push him away due to his inability to wake from a drunken coma. The video comes to a close when she appears at a fictitious Howling Bells joint at The Camden Barfly where she is overwhelmed by the music and dances to her favorite song. It's a Low Happening.

==== Track listings ====
CD digipack - LIBSP7183.2:

1. "Low Happening"
2. "The Wild"
3. "This City's Burning"

CD - BELLACD136:

1. "Low Happening"
2. "Low Happening"(Dogsend Squash Club remix)
3. "4 Play Documentary"(CD-ROM video)
4. "Low Happening"(CD-ROM video)

7" - BELLAV136:

1. "Low Happening"
2. "Low Happening"(¡Forward, Russia! remix)

Digital downloads:

1. "Low Happening"(The Presets remix)
2. "Low Happening"(Dogsend Squash Club remix)
3. "Low Happening"(Little People remix)
4. "Low Happening"(¡Forward, Russia! remix)

== Music videos ==
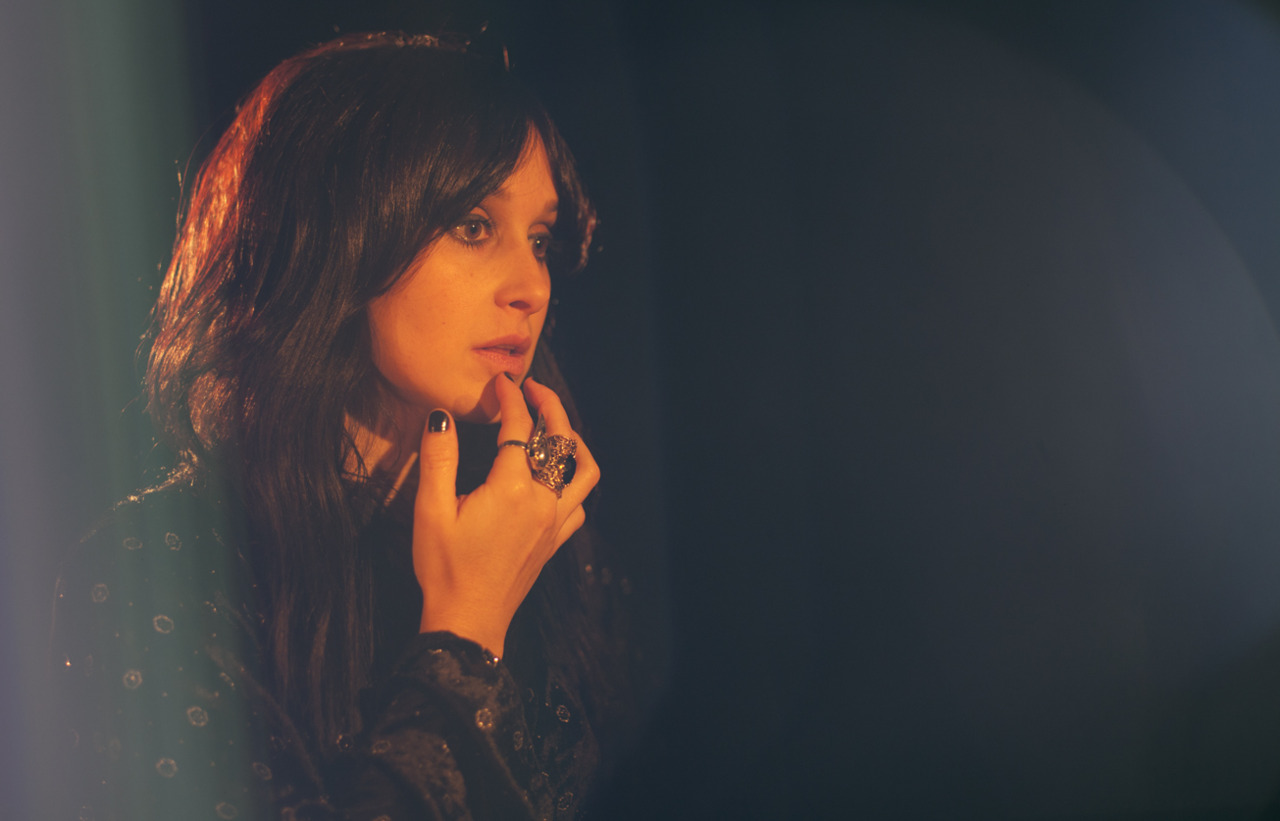
Juanita Stein on the set of the music video for "Into the Sky" (2011).

Year	Title	Director
2005	"Low Happening"	Josh Louge
2006	"Wishing Stone"	N/A
2006	"Blessed Night"	Dan Fernbach
2006	"Setting Sun"	Dan Fernbach
2007	"Low Happening"	Dan Sully
2007	"Broken Bones"	Adam Jones
2008	"Into the Chaos"	N/A
2009	"Cities Burning Down"	Piper Ferguson
2009	"Digital Hearts"	Dan Lowe
2011	"Into the Sky"	Ollie Murray
2014	"Slowburn"	Lexi Kiddo
2014	"Your Love"	Giorgio Testi
2014	"Original Sin"	Anselm Belser
