= Heartstrings (Howling Bells album) =

Studio album by Howling Bells
- Released: 2 June 2014
- Recorded: November 2013
- Studios: Assault & Battery, London
- Genre: Indie rock
- Length: 31:26
- Label: Birthday Records
- Producers: Catherine J. Marks, Alan Moulder

Howling Bells chronology
The Loudest Engine (2011)	''Heartstrings'' (2014)

Singles from Heartstrings
- 1. "Slowburn" Released: 7 April 2014; 2. "Your Love" Released: 2 June 2014; 3. "Original Sin" Released: 6 October 2014

Heartstrings is the fourth studio album of London-based Australian indie rock band Howling Bells. The album was released through Birthday Records on 2 June 2014 to generally favourable reviews. It was co-produced by Catherine J. Marks and Alan Moulder, and recorded at Assault & Battery 2, London, in November 2013.

Howling Bells, by and large, did not write for Heartstrings until more than two years following the release of their previous album, The Loudest Engine. Over that period, the band members committed themselves to other ventures. Original Howling Bells bass guitarist Brendan Picchio, left the band and was eventually replaced with Gary Daines. Furthermore, vocalist and rhythm guitarist Juanita Stein became a first-time mother after giving birth. The writing and recording process for Heartstrings was quick and was completed within the span of one month. The album bears resemblance to Howling Bells' first album Howling Bells, musically, thematically, and in the cinematic sense. The band moved on from record label Cooking Vinyl and entered an agreement with Birthday Records. Heartstrings and its accompanying singles failed to place on music charts in any nation.

To promote the album, Howling Bells performed a series of free in-store events at retail record outlets throughout the UK, which included shows at Rough Trade and Fopp Records. The band also headlined shows throughout the UK in the months surrounding the release.

== Background ==
Throughout the duration of time that Heartstrings was conceived and Howling Bells' last album, The Loudest Engine was released, vocalist and rhythm guitarist Juanita Stein, drummer Glenn Moule, and Juanita's brother Joel Stein took a break from the band and dedicated themselves to other projects. Juanita, along with Nick Hodgson, former drummer of Kaiser Chiefs, Tom Greatorex and Danny Prescott of Black Wire, and Hodgson's wife Anna Goodall formed a band, Albert Albert. Joel produced an album and started a solo project titled, Glassmaps. Moule was credited for his work on albums for other artists. During this period, native Londoner Gary Daines replaced original Howling Bells bass guitarist Brendan Picchio, who left the band. According to Juanita, the addition of Daines brought balance to Howling Bells, whereas before she felt that the band was unsteady.

The songs on Heartstrings are a culmination of all the experiences of the last decade, being on the road for years, turning away and starting families and then coming back to it. Lyrically it’s a very confident expression of where we are.

— Juanita describing songs on the album

In 2012, Juanita gave birth to a baby daughter, Daisy Jean. Through motherhood, she discovered that things that used to be important to her were no longer nearly as relevant as she once thought. This affected her songwriting process in a positive way as she became less self-critical. During October 2013, Juanita, in a creatively inspired bout, wrote songs every day in the basement of her North London home and exchanged them back and forth amongst the other members of the band to collect ideas. According to Juanita, the album is filled with extreme highs and lows which resemble what the band has endured over the years. As a result, the choice of the name Heartstrings was appropriate. Juanita stated that the title means the most emotional of feelings and it seemingly captured the open and expressive nature of the album.

Howling Bells sent demos out to prospective producers, one of which was Alan Moulder. At the time, Moulder was busy mixing another project, but he suggested that the band get into contact with an associate of his, Catherine J. Marks, a native Australian who moved to London and became an audio engineer for Flood and Moulder. The band met with her and there was an immediate connection, so they accepted her as the producer of the album. In the end, Marks and Moulder came together and co-produced the album. (Note: Credits according to album notes.) Shortly before the recording of Heartstrings, Marks contacted Juanita and expressed her fear that the band would not have enough time to record the album and suggested that they consider delaying it until after the new year. Howling Bells decided against this and began recording soon thereafter. The band wanted to recapture the urgency that was exhibited on their first record, Howling Bells, that they felt was missing on their previous two records, Radio Wars, and The Loudest Engine. Juanita credits the sound of the album to the band being comfortable and accepting of the way that they sound as a band instead of trying to sound like something that they are not, which is something that they attempted in the past.

== Production ==
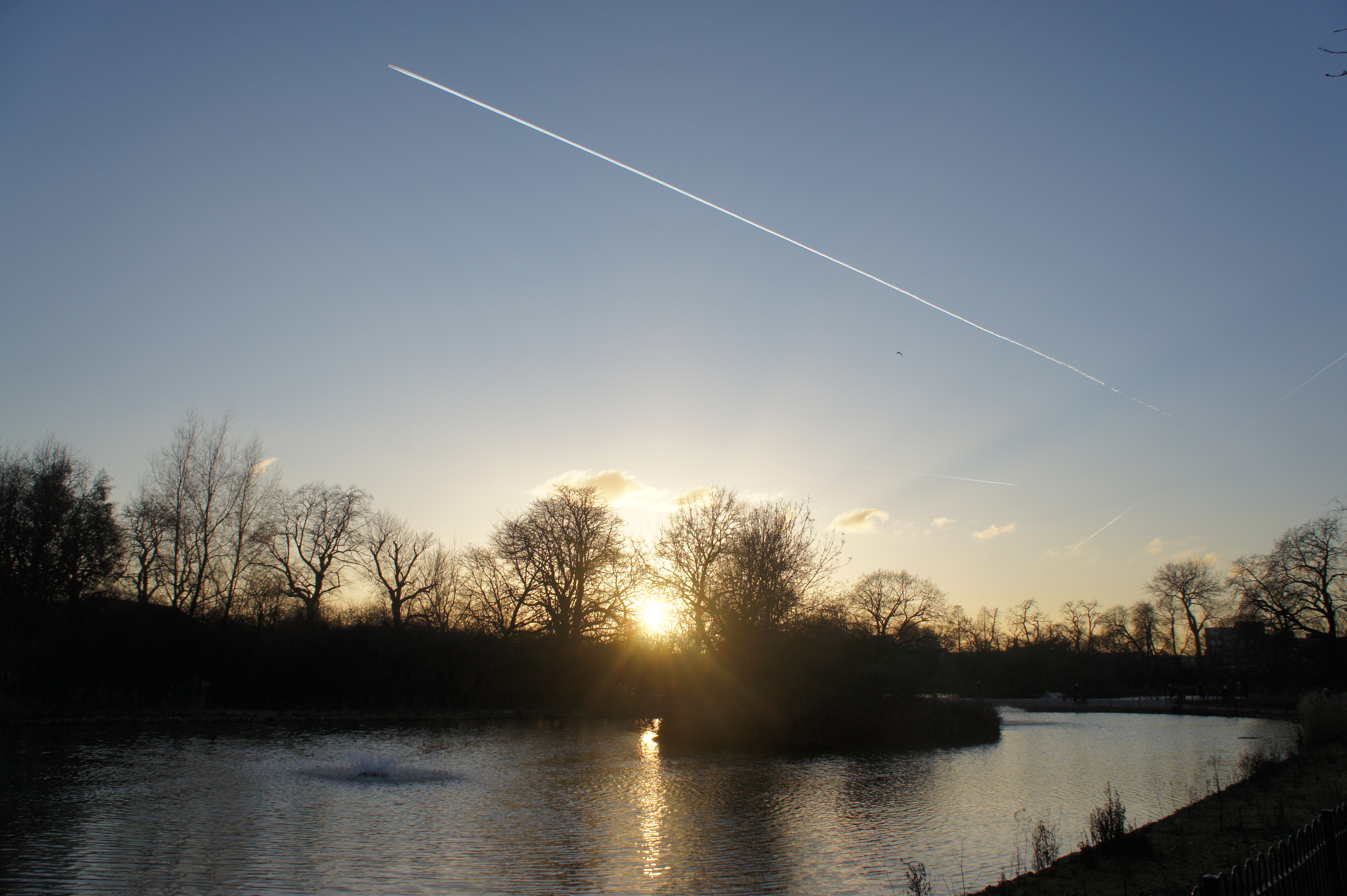
Images for Heartstrings were taken at Clissold Park in the London Borough of Hackney.

In November 2013, Howling Bells recorded Heartstrings over an eleven-day period at Assault & Battery Studios in North London. The album was predominately produced by Marks but Moulder periodically came to the studio where he gave insight and perspective, and ultimately oversaw the process. Members of the band stated that Marks had an immense energy about her and was very intense and enthusiastic in the studio.

The piano on "Paper Heart" was played on a Grotrian-Steinweg Concert Grand Piano that was previously housed at Abbey Road Studios and was owned by English audio engineer, musician, and record producer, Alan Parsons (The Beatles, Pink Floyd, Alan Parsons Project). Howling Bells wrote "Heartstrings" (the title track), a few years prior, but were never content with its outcome so they suspended the song's recording. It initially featured a different instrumentation and musical structure with a piano and synthesizers, along with a higher vocal register. The band substituted a guitar for the keyed instruments and took the song down an octave to make it work with the album.

Along with production, the album was mixed by Marks and Moulder as well. It was mixed on Pro Tools with a Chandler Limited 16 x 2 Mini Rack Mixer and ran through an EQ, as well as a compressor. The album was mastered by John Davis at Metropolis Studios in London. Two of Juanita's Albert Albert bandmates, Hodgson and Greatorex, played a part in the overall production of Heartstrings. Hodgson founded the small, independent record label, Birthday Records, and signed Howling Bells to it after the band parted ways with previous record label Cooking Vinyl. Greatorex was responsible for the art design of the album. Juanita was responsible for the photography on the album, which was taken at Clissold Park, near her home. Howling Bells referenced movie posters from the 1970s, including the film, Badlands, for the artwork on the album.

== Singles ==
"Slowburn" (2014)
The lead single released from Howling Bells' fourth album, Heartstrings.

Howling Bells released each of the singles from Heartstrings on the band's SoundCloud page two months prior to the respective release of each single. The lead single issued from the album was "Slowburn" (April 2014). Juanita stated that the songs' lyrics are very personal to her. She declared that everything regarding herself happens slow and late. This impelled her to refer to herself as a late bloomer, or in her words a "slow-burner". In a review for NME, music journalist Mark Beaumont, appreciated the dark, sulky sound of the track. He went on to call it "a moody, magnificent slab of gnarly coyote rock." The week of its physical release, Drowned in Sound named the track as their "Single of the Week". The accompanying music video was directed by Lexi Kiddo in March 2014. The second single released from Heartstrings was "Your Love" (June 2014). The lyrics for the single evoke the forsaken state of heartbreak and how a person in that situation will embrace anything that may restore the relationship. The accompanying music video was directed by Giorgio Testi for Pulse Films. One month after the official release of "Your Love", Joel, under his Glassmaps project, released an electronic remix of the single. An accompanying video was created by Josh Williams at Howl Films. The album's third released single was "Original Sin" (October 2014). The accompanying music video was directed by Anselm Belser.

== Promotion, release and reception ==
Professional ratings
Aggregate scores
Source	Rating
Metacritic	69/100
Review scores
Source	Rating
DIY	3/5 stars
Drowned in Sound	8/10 stars
Goldmine	(favourable)
Mojo	3/5 stars
musicOMH	4/5 stars
NME	7/10 stars
Q	(mixed)
Rolling Stone Australia	2.5/5 stars
The Skinny	2/5 stars
Uncut	7/10 stars

Heartstrings was released worldwide as a download on 2 June 2014. That same day, CD and LP releases of the album were offered in the United Kingdom and France, followed by physical releases in additional countries within the next week. The day of the release, the band played a free show at retail outlet Rough Trade, in London, on the day of the release. They played additional free in-store shows in the days that followed, which included shows at Fopp Records. Howling Bells headlined shows throughout the UK in May and June. They played V Festival in the UK in August and returned to Australia to tour there and in New Zealand in September.

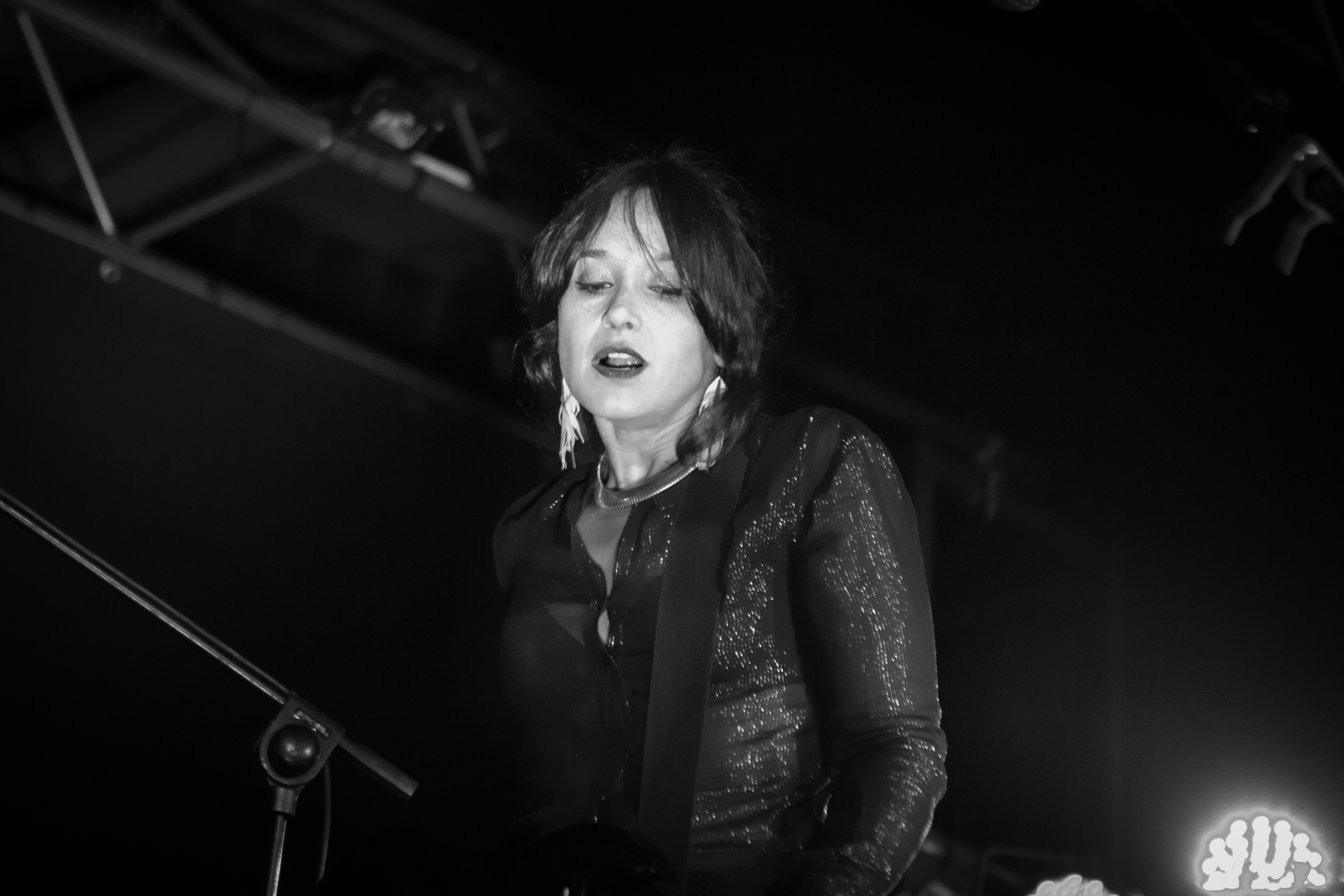
Juanita Stein, The Tuning Fork, 2014.

Heartstrings received generally mixed to favourable reviews. At Metacritic, which assigns a normalized rating out of 100 to reviews from music critics, the album received an average score of 69, based on 10 reviews, which indicates "generally favorable reviews". At AnyDecentMusic?, which assigns an averaged rating out of 10 to reviews from music critics, the album received an average score of 6.6, based on 15 reviews. Luke McNaney of The Music Fix, rated the album 8/10 and referred to the band as "louder and more intimate than ever...eight years on [Howling Bells] still deserve to be considered a serious proposition." Benjamin Hiorns of Subba-Cultcha, rated the album 8/10 and called it "pure sex" and regarded it as the bands' best album since their debut, Howling Bells. He likened the album's opening riff on "Paris" to that of something that resembled "Shine On You Crazy Diamond" by Pink Floyd, and declared "Euphoria", as "a song Roy Orbison would have been proud to call his own". Lisa–Marie Ferla of The Arts Desk, rated the album 4/5 and professed that "Heartstrings" (the title track) "is easily one of the most beautiful things the band has ever done". Billy Withers of Rockfreaks, rated the album 9/10 was overly impressed with how diverse the album is and how reinvigorated that the band sounds. The only track from the album that he somewhat disliked was "Your Love", which he labeled as "too cheery".

Michael Dwyer of Rolling Stone Australia, rated the album 2.5/5 and asserted that Heartstrings is not the album that will garner people's attention. Stu Lewis of The Skinny, rated the album 2/5 and stated that after the opening three tracks the album becomes "listless and repetitive". He went on to say, "It's all perfectly pleasant, but pleasant just isn't enough to demand repeated listening". Alex Jackson of Shout 4 Music, gave the album 7/10 but said that the record is "at times ragged...a little all over the place". Charlee Redman of mxdwn, is another critic that liked the album, but referred to both "Your Love" and "Heartstrings" (the title track), as "calm ballads that border on sappy". Redman concluded his review by saying, "While Heartstrings shows they still have some work to do, Howling Bells will certainly be a band to watch". Matthew Davies of DIY, felt that the first half of the album is exhausting, and that the second half is disappointingly unexciting. He also added, "[Howling Bells] are still seductive, fiery and invigorating, but oddly with age there seems to be chinks of weakness in their tenderness".

== Track listing ==
All lyrics are written by Juanita Stein except where shown (Note: Songwriting credits for Juanita Stein adapted from ASCAP.)

No.	Title	Writer(s)	Length
1.	"Paris"		3:54
2.	"Possessed"		1:49
3.	"Your Love"		3:34
4.	"Slowburn"		2:32
5.	"Tornado"	Peter Stein	3:00
6.	"Euphoria"		3:06
7.	"Paper Heart"		3:25
8.	"Original Sin"	Juanita Stein, Joel Stein	3:12
9.	"Reverie"		2:58
10.	"Heartstrings"		3:56
Total length:			31:26

== Personnel ==
Howling Bells members

- Juanita Stein – vocals, rhythm guitar
- Joel Stein – lead guitar
- Gary Daines – bass guitar
- Glenn Moule – drums, percussion

Production

- Catherine J. Marks – co-producer, mixing engineer
- Alan Moulder – co-producer, mixing engineer
- John Davis – mastering engineer
- Drew Smith – assistant engineer
- Caesar Edmunds – assistant engineer
- Tom Greatorex – art design
- Juanita Stein – photography

== Release history ==
Region	Date (2014)	Label	Format	Catalogue No.	Ref.
Worldwide	2 June	Birthday Records	Download	N/A	
UK	2 June	Birthday Records	CD	BR0006	
UK	2 June	Birthday Records	LP	BRLP0006	
France	2 June	Birthday Records	LP	BRLP0006	
France	2 June	Birthday Records	CD	BR0006	
Australia	6 June	Birthday Records	CD	BR0006	
Australia	6 June	Birthday Records	LP	BRLP0006	
New Zealand	6 June	Birthday Records	LP	BRLP0006	
New Zealand	6 June	Birthday Records	CD	BR0006	
Germany	6 June	Birthday Records	CD	BR0006	
Germany	6 June	Birthday Records	LP	BRLP0006	
N. America	10 June	Birthday Records	LP	BRLP0006	
N. America	10 June	Birthday Records	CD	BR0006	
