= Juanita Stein =

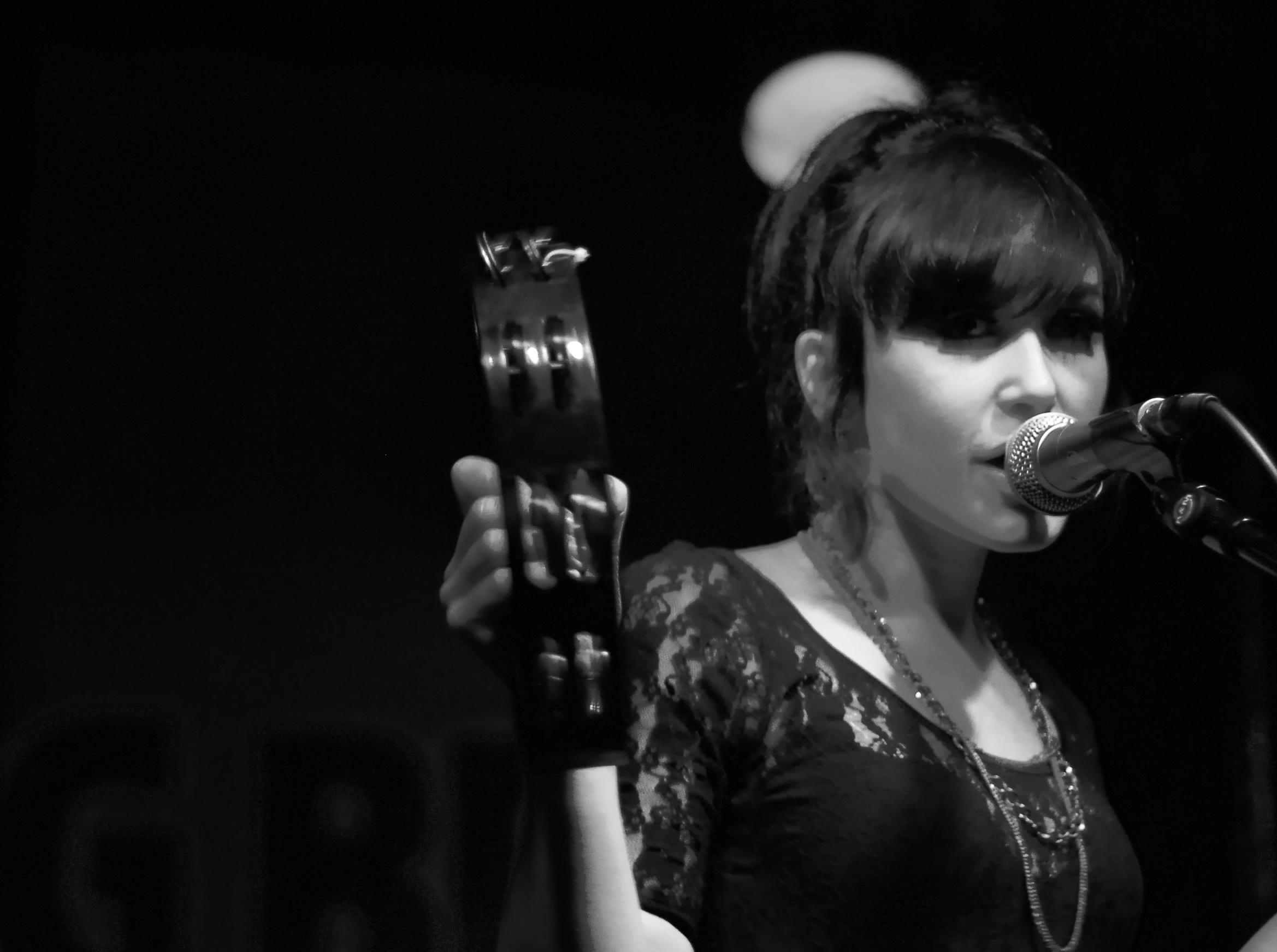
- Juanita Stein, Bristol, 2009

Background information
- Born: Melbourne, Victoria, Australia
- Origin: Sydney, New South Wales, Australia
- Genre: Indie rock
- Occupations: Musician, songwriter
- Instruments: Vocals, guitar, bass, percussion
- Years active: 1999–present
- Labels: Bella Union, Liberation, Independiente, Play It Again Sam, Hostess, Nettwerk, Cooking Vinyl, Birthday Records, Nude Records, Handwritten Records
- Website: www.juanitastein.com

Juanita Stein is an Australian musician, who is lead vocalist and rhythm guitarist in indie rock band Howling Bells. She has younger twin brothers Joel and Ari. She writes songs and sings in her own solo albums, including America (2017) and The Weightless Hour (2024).

== Early life and education ==
Juanita Stein was born in Melbourne and moved to Sydney at an early age. Her father Peter Stein was a songwriter and musician; mother Linda Stein is a former stage and television actress.

Stein attended school in Sydney before obtaining a Bachelor of Arts in literature at university in the city, where she also studied Theatre Performance and an electronic music course. Her first time in a music recording studio was when she was five years old and contributed vocals to one of her father's songs. The experience shaped her life as she later said; "From then on, innately I knew that's what I would do." Brother Joel remembers her dedication to learning songs even in childhood: "She would sit in her room and learn old Beatles songs with the door shut until three in the morning. This was when she was about twelve. I would hear her voice at night."

Juanita Stein was brought up listening to all kinds of music but the first song she remembers hearing was Bob Marley's "Buffalo Soldier". She said; "It's strange out of all the songs in the world that that was the one that I distinctly remember connecting with at a very, very young age. It was a really great moment. I just remember that song sounded different to me than every other song that was playing on the radio." Her own early favourite artists were Nirvana, Juliana Hatfield, Björk, Portishead and Jimi Hendrix.

Her adolescence was different from that of many other teenagers: "There wasn't a lot to rebel against, my parents were cool and listened to cool music. Dad told me about his drug experiences, so I couldn't rebel by doing that."

== Music career ==
=== Waikiki (1999–2003) ===
Juanita Stein wrote and played music while at university, mainly "[a] kind of folk music, in duets and trios." Then "at one point I really wanted to stop playing other people's music" so, after a brief stint in a group called Dirty Boots, in 1999 she and Joel Stein formed Waikiki, the name chosen by picking a random word out of an encyclopedia. She said, "We’d been playing in different formats for a while, and that was when I felt like it was possible for me to play music with a bunch of people. He's a brilliant guitarist. I feel very lucky to work with him all the time."

They then advertised for a drummer to join them. Their advertisement read: "Original band looking for drummer. Our influences are Mazzy Star, Radiohead and the Beatles." Glenn Moule joined the siblings to record and release a five-track EP Presents in 2000. Juanita Stein used the pseudonym Kikisun on the EP, on which she sang lead vocals and played bass.

The trio were later joined by second guitarist Jimmy (or Jimmeh) Brandon and released an album, I'm Already Home, in 2002. Brandon left the band in 2003 and was replaced by bass player Brendan Picchio, at which time Juanita Stein moved to playing rhythm guitar.

=== Howling Bells (2004–2017; 2026) ===
In early 2004, Waikiki disbanded, the group members moved to London and re-formed as Howling Bells, who have released five albums: Howling Bells in 2006, Radio Wars in 2009, The Loudest Engine in 2011, Heartstrings in 2014, and Strange Life in 2026. Juanita Stein said the change of name and relocation was part of a natural musical progression: "Waikiki is almost part of my childhood. I was 16 when I wrote some of the songs. It was time to move on." She added; "At some point you kind of leave school, if that makes sense. I felt like I’d grown up a little bit. The music I was listening to and the music I was writing behind closed doors was so vastly different from [what] I was singing at the time and I just felt like it was to time to take a bit of a risk and make something different.".

When asked if she now considers London as ‘home’, she replied; "Sydney is our sentimental home — it's where we grew up, had our first kiss, first cigarette, first band. However, London feels like our musical birthplace. It inspires art in a way no other city has." She enjoys her returns to Australia: "It's really good. It's really nice and warm and comforting. You know, to come back to a place and it's sunny and it's friendly and your friends and family are all there – it's a really nice combination."

Stein was selected in the top ten of Clash magazine's "Top Women of 2009" list.

=== Solo career (2012–present) ===
Stein began working on a solo album in March 2012 and began recording in Los Angeles in June 2015. She then toured the UK supporting The White Buffalo in July 2016. She released her first solo album, America, in 2017, and then immediately began work on her second solo album, Until the Lights Fade, which was later released on 31 August 2018. She has since released albums Snapshot (2020), Locked Down (Live from Brighton Electric) (2021), and The Weightless Hour (2024).

=== Other work ===
Juanita has performed with several other artists. She sang on two songs for Australian group The Givegoods' album, I Want To Kill A Rich Man: the title track and "Black and Blue". She also sang with Australian group On Inc, on a song entitled "Spooky", and performed a duet with brother Ari on a song called, "LA To San Fran", which was played on Ari's Myspace page for a time. She performed backing vocals on two tracks on father Peter's album Tear It Down: "What Would It Take?" and "Still Waters". She also contributed vocals to The Sleepy Jackson's 2006 album, Personality – One Was a Spider, One Was a Bird. In September 2010, she performed a duet with Australian singer and songwriter Steve Smyth live on stage at The Days of Decadence in Shoreditch, London and also contributed backing vocals on the track "Stay Young" on his 2011 debut album entitled Release. Juanita performed backing vocals on "Up With the Birds", which features on Coldplay's fifth studio album Mylo Xyloto. She also sang backing vocals on the track "Angel Tears" on Barrie-James O'Neill's 2016 album Cold Coffee.

In August 2013 Stein debuted with a new London band named Albert Albert, formed by former Kaiser Chiefs drummer Nick Hodgson.

In January 2015 Stein played with Brandon Flowers of The Killers at the World Economic Forum in Davos.

In April 2015 Stein opened the Salesforce keynote session in Chicago at the Salesforce World Tour at McCormick Place.

=== Influences ===
Juanita Stein's songwriting is inspired by many other artists and also by films and dreams. She said, "I have insane dreams, that's very much a part of who I am. The visual realm is very important, as are films, to me and they have inspired a lot of [my] music."

Stein has named Nirvana as "my all-time favourite band" and her musical influences have included Françoise Hardy, Björk, Kate Bush, Air, Siouxsie Sioux, The Slits and Magazine. She cites the films Leon, Frankie and Johnny, Jaws, Edward Scissorhands, Chinatown and Vivre Sa Vie as amongst her inspirations.
