= Howling Bells =

Australian indie rock band

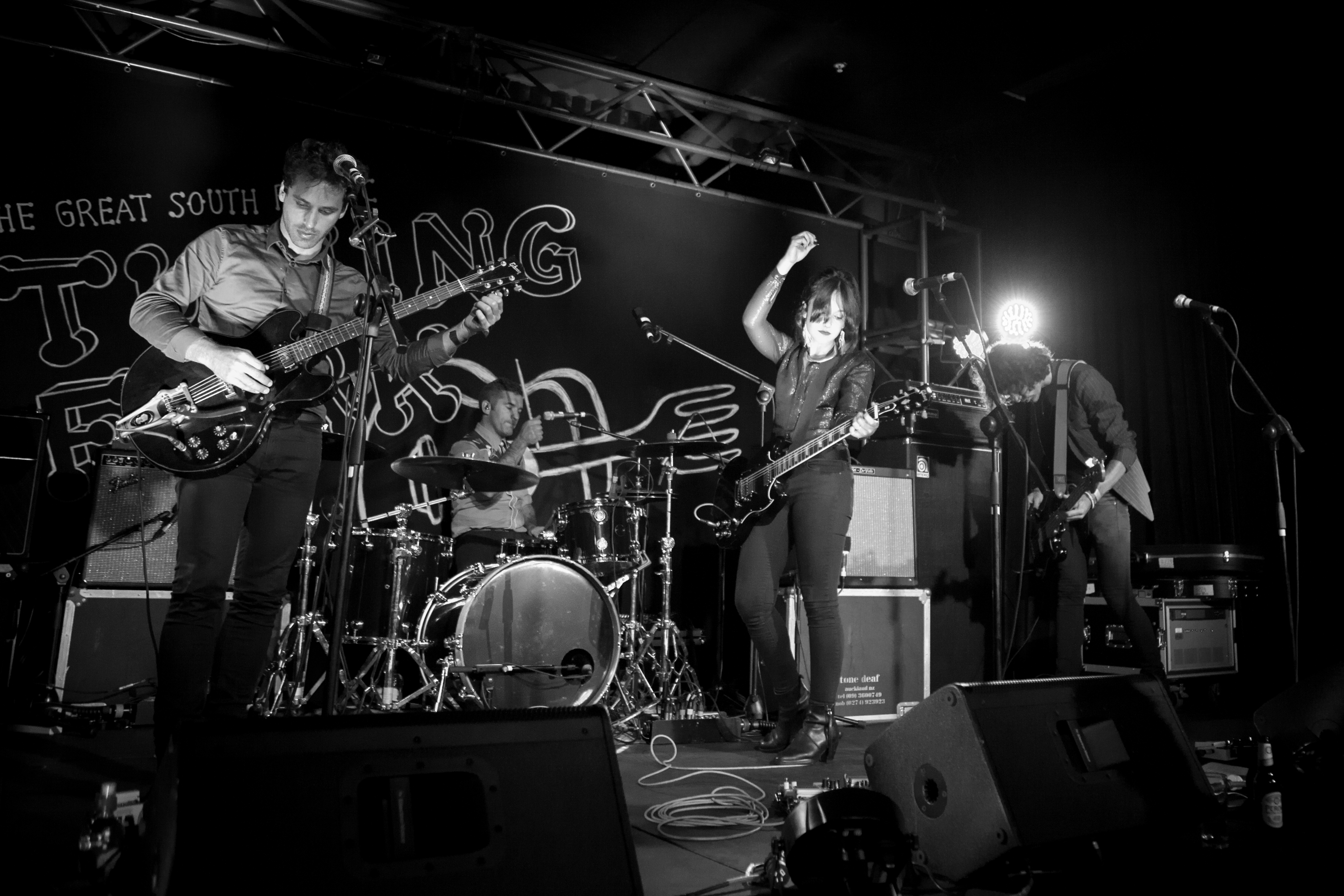
- Howling Bells, The Tuning Fork, September 2014; From left to right: Joel Stein, Glenn Moule, Juanita Stein, Gary Daines

Background information
- Origin: Sydney, New South Wales, Australia
- Genre: Indie rock
- Years active: 2004–2014, 2025–present; Reunions: 2017, 2022
- Labels: Bella Union, Liberation, Independiente, Play It Again Sam, Hostess, Nettwerk, Cooking Vinyl, Nude Records, Birthday Records
- Spinoff of: Waikiki
- Members: Juanita Stein; Joel Stein; Glenn Moule
- Past members: Gary Daines; Brendan Picchio
- Website: ffm.bio/howlingbells

Howling Bells are an Australian indie rock band that formed in Sydney, New South Wales in 2004 and later relocated to the UK. The band obtained popularity following the release of its 2006 self-titled debut album. The band's current line-up consists of siblings Juanita (vocals, rhythm guitar) and Joel Stein (lead guitar), as well as drummer Glenn Moule. They are joined by bassist Jimi Wheelwright for live performances

Originally called Waikiki, the band changed its name and musical style preceding its move from Australia to England. Howling Bells' self-titled debut album was produced by Ken Nelson and released in 2006. The album charted in both the UK and Australia, and was included on several year-end lists. The band's next release, Radio Wars (2009), received mixed reviews, although it charted higher than its predecessor. Their third album, The Loudest Engine (2011), received largely favourable reviews but underperformed on the charts in comparison to the bands' two prior releases. Their fourth album, Heartstrings, was released in June 2014. A fifth, Strange Life, is slated for release in February 2026.

Howling Bells have described their sound as "melodic blues" and "country-goth." The band count acts such as The Beatles and Jimi Hendrix as influences, and have been compared to Mazzy Star and The Velvet Underground.

== History ==
=== Formation ===
In 1999, Glenn Moule formed the pop rock group Waikiki with the Stein siblings – Juanita on lead vocals and bass, and Joel on guitar and backing vocals. They toured the Australian eastern states as a trio and released an EP, Presents, in 2000. In 2002, now with rhythm guitarist Jimmy Brandon, they issued the Top 50 album I'm Already Home. The band then toured Australia and New Zealand. In early 2003, Brandon left the band and bassist Brendan Picchio joined, with Juanita switching to rhythm guitar. The group soon became dissatisfied with its material, so the members chose a new direction for their music. They wrote a number of new songs and made a wish list of producers with whom they would like to work. In 2004, the band changed its name to Howling Bells, as its members felt that phrase better embodied its newly adapted indie rock style.

I realised onstage one night that I wasn't into it. I didn't believe in what I was doing. I thought, how will [the audience] feel it if I can't?

— Juanita Stein's thoughts on Waikiki

Demos of the new material were sent to British producer Ken Nelson (Coldplay, Gomez). The band members considered him to be an unattainable candidate as a producer, but he responded favourably. Upon learning that he was interested in working with them, they moved to London. At the time, Nelson was occupied working with Coldplay. For eight to ten months, the band lived in adverse conditions in one room in a house in London. During this period, the members took up menial employment opportunities. Picchio sold double-glazing over the telephone. Moule worked in a pub and in a car workshop, and Joel worked on a farm.

=== Howling Bells (2005–2008) ===
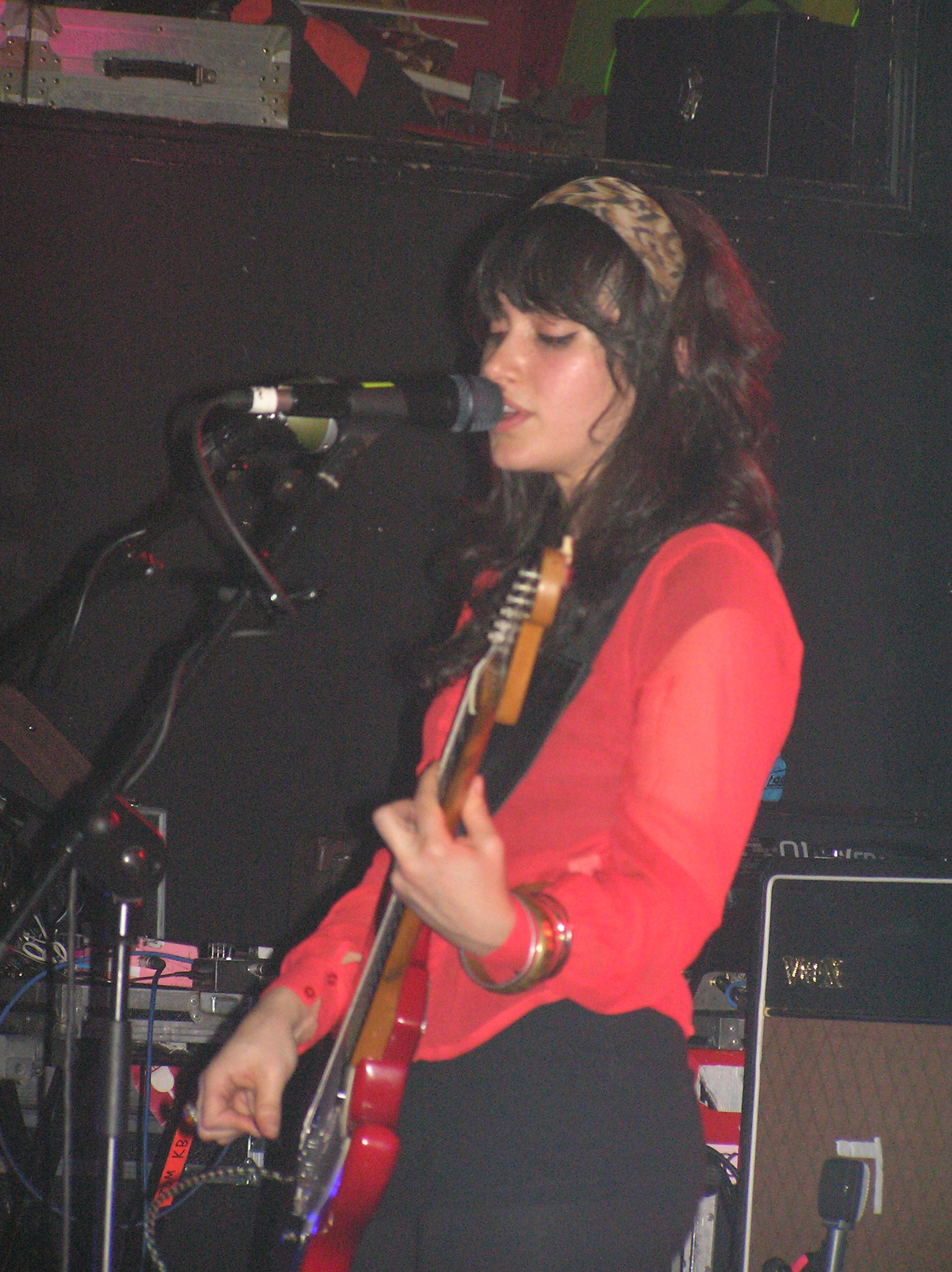
Juanita Stein, Portsmouth, 2006.

Howling Bells waited for almost a year while Nelson worked on Coldplay's X&Y album. Frustrated by the unforeseen delay, they considered returning to Australia. However, in early 2005, Nelson became available, and they recorded their first album at Parr Street Studios, Liverpool. Howling Bells exhibited a brooding sound, and it was a departure from the poppier style of music demonstrated by Waikiki. The long delay and the experience of a cold British winter had affected the tone of their music.

By July 2005, the band was not yet signed to a record label. Howling Bells toured for ten months prior to the release of the album. They played sporadically in clubs in Australia and North America, and they toured Europe and the UK with Editors. The group played extensive UK club shows with many artists, including The Young Knives and Hank & Lily. Howling Bells also played Camden Crawl and the 2006 NME New Music Tour.

The album was released in May 2006 in the United Kingdom on the Bella Union label and in Australia in July through Liberation. It received critical acclaim, including a perfect 5/5 from musicOMH. NME rated it 9/10 and wrote in a review, "By turns beguiling and enthralling, this is an extraordinary album." Howling Bells peaked in the Top 100 of the UK Albums Chart and just outside the Top 50 of the Australian Albums Chart. At the time, it was the fastest selling album on the Bella Union label. The release appeared on Album of the Year lists for a number of different publications. In its 22 March 2007 issue, Rolling Stone named Howling Bells one of their three bands to watch out for that year.

Howling Bells spent much of the next two years touring the UK, Europe, Australia, and the US. They played at the 2007 NME Awards Show. They performed at numerous festivals during the northern hemisphere's summer months in 2006 and 2007, including Reading and Leeds and Latitude. They supported Placebo in Europe and Australia and The Futureheads in the UK. The band also supported Mercury Rev, Snow Patrol, and The Killers across three different continents.

=== Radio Wars (2008–2009) ===
This album is talking less about innate feelings and more about the impact between myself or ourselves and the world around us.

— Juanita Stein, Repeat

Howling Bells parted ways with Bella Union and, in 2008, signed a deal with record label Independiente. The band worked with producer and mixer Dan Grech-Marguerat (Radiohead, Paul McCartney) and recorded its follow-up album, Radio Wars, at several different recording studios. At times, the members found it difficult to work with their new producer. However, they have stated that in retrospect, they learned a great deal from him and felt fortunate for having the experience of collaborating with him.

Radio Wars was first released in the UK in March 2009, and it appeared in several other countries shortly thereafter. The album signalled a change in direction. The band's music had become brighter and more accessible and placed a greater emphasis on keyboards. Consequently, reviews were mixed. BBC Music claimed "the second chance may well have been squandered." Gigwise called it "an album of mashed-up half ideas." In a positive review, ABC described it as "anthemic, edgy, stomping indie rock at its best." It peaked in the Top 30 in Australia and just outside the Top 50 in the UK.

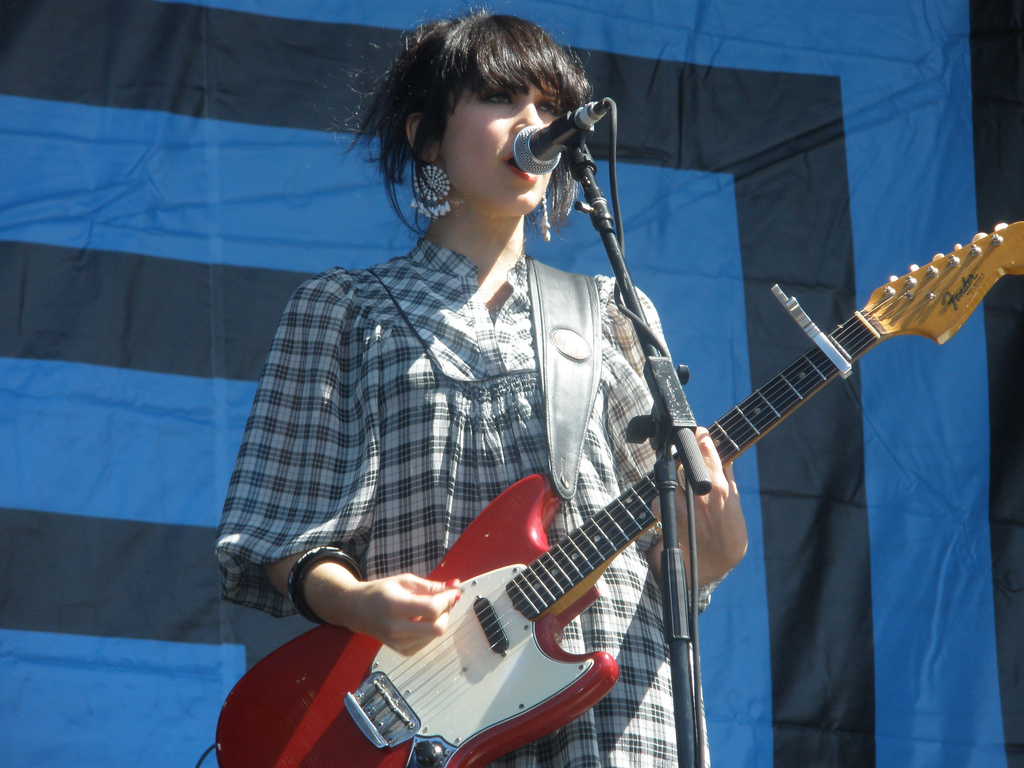
Juanita Stein, V Festival, Sydney, 2009.

Howling Bells headlined a tour of the UK in March 2009, supported by The Joy Formidable and Chew Lips. They played V Festival in Australia in April and were then invited to support Coldplay in May and June in North America. The band played more festivals in Europe, including Hop Farm, Hard Rock Calling, and Pukkelpop. They supported Coldplay again for three nights of their European leg in August and September. The group returned to Australia to write music for its third album and to tour in December. Howling Bells received much praise from bands they supported on tour. Coldplay's Chris Martin advised his audiences to download Howling Bells' song "Nightingale." In July, Snow Patrol's Gary Lightbody named the group as his "Band of the Week" in Q magazine.

Juanita made the decision to develop her on-stage persona in 2008 and 2009. She became more confident, animated, and outgoing in her interactions with the audience and in her choice of clothes and hairstyles. In March 2009, Gigwise proclaimed her "the sexiest woman in rock." She also placed among the top ten of Clash magazine's "Top Woman of 2009" list.

=== The Loudest Engine (2010–2012) ===
Howling Bells began writing material for The Loudest Engine in mid–2009, and expressed hope that 2010 would see the release of the album, but it did not. Juanita labelled the band's new writing as "real organic, real jammy ... very melodic, but very raw." They played new material during their December 2009 Australian tour. One critic described it as "a more rollicking, rock and roll approach." In 2010, the band severed its partnership with Independiente and later negotiated a contract agreement with Cooking Vinyl.

In September 2010, Howling Bells started recording The Loudest Engine at the Killers-owned Battle Born Studios in Las Vegas. It was produced by bassist Mark Stoermer, whom the group had met while it toured with The Killers. The relationship between Stoermer and Howling Bells strengthened after the band disembarked from its flight to Las Vegas. The flight had been delayed by more than 12 hours, but he had nonetheless waited for them at the airport. Howling Bells were impressed by his style of work. Rather than overproducing, he kept the amount of takes to a minimum and allowed the band just to play, which kept the sessions very natural. The band members became less conscious of trying to please other people, made the record that they wanted, and hoped that it would change people's attitudes toward the band.

The Loudest Engine was first issued in Australia in September 2011. The album received mostly favourable reviews from music critics, but it did receive its share of negative response as well. Mojo magazine rated the release 8/10 and praised it as the band's finest album to date. On the opposite end of the spectrum, NME rated it 2/10 and claimed that it "[fell] flat in a puddle of MOR." The Loudest Engine charted in both the UK and Australia. To coincide with the release of the album, Howling Bells played a short six-date tour of the UK. In November, they supported Elbow in Europe, and later that month they returned to Australia, where they headlined shows in December. Following this, bass guitarist Brendan Picchio left the band and was eventually replaced with Gary Daines.

=== Heartstrings (2013–2014) ===
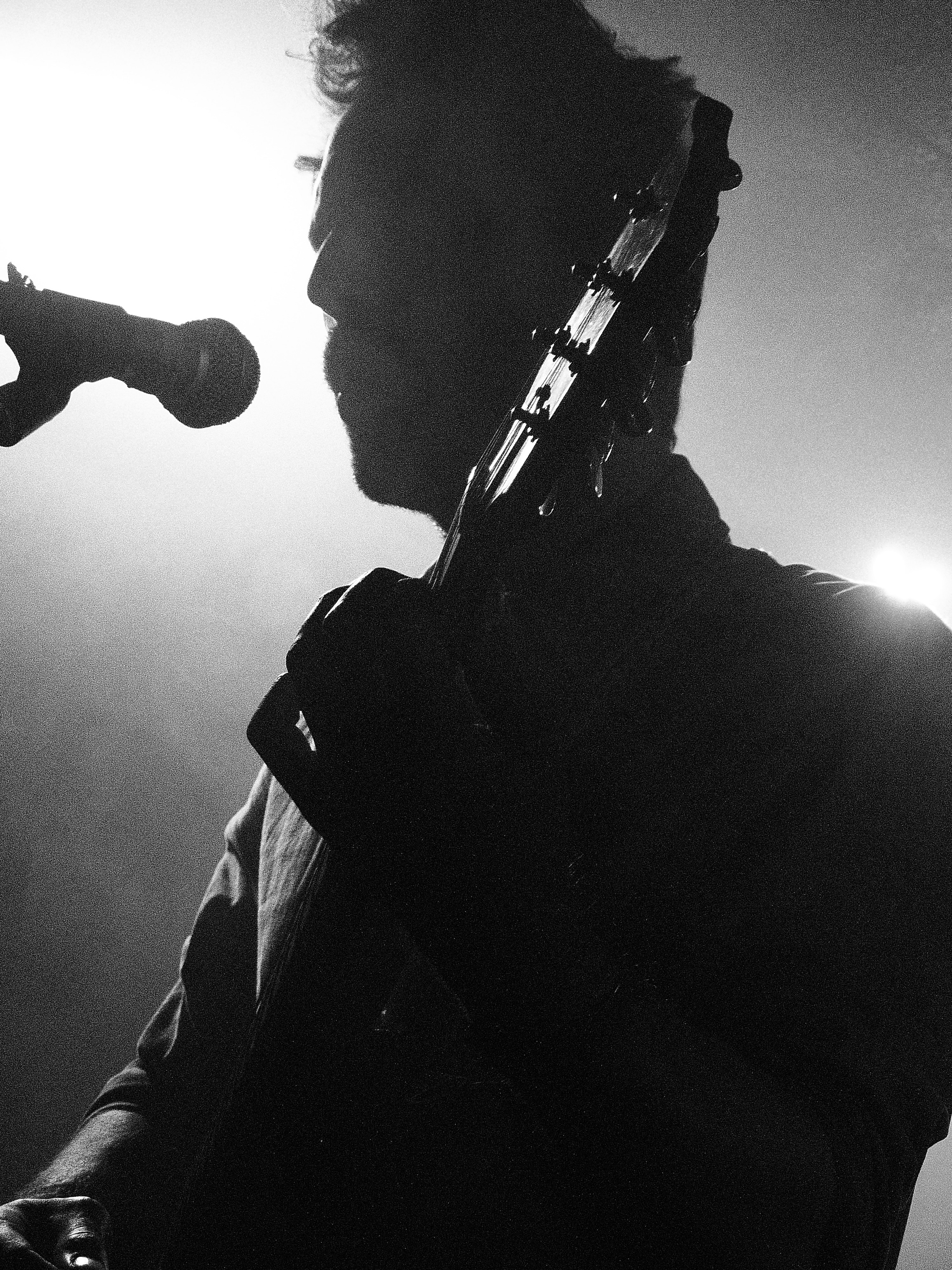
Joel Stein, King Tut's, 2014

Heartstrings materialized following a brief hiatus by Howling Bells, whereupon the band members worked on other projects. Additionally, Juanita became a first-time mother after giving birth. This, along with frustration from the long period of inactivity and creation inspired her and she started to write songs again, at which point she got the other members of the band involved. They made demos and sent them out to prospective producers, one being Alan Moulder (Nine Inch Nails, The Smashing Pumpkins). Moulder was busy at the time so he recommended that the band contact an assistant of his, Catherine J. Marks (Foals, The Killers), who after meeting, Howling Bells chose to produce the album.

In November 2013, Howling Bells recorded Heartstrings at Assault & Battery Studios, in London. The album was primarily produced by Marks, but Moulder supported the effort and was given credit as co-producer. Marks set the tone of the environment in the recording studio and the band felt extremely open and comfortable in her presence. Her female nature was credited with her ability to elicit exceptional performances from the band, more so than any of her record producer counterparts who worked with Howling Bells previously. The band moved on from former label Cooking Vinyl and established a partnership with Birthday Records, a small, independent record label founded by former Kaiser Chiefs drummer, Nick Hodgson.

Heartstrings was released worldwide in June 2014. The album received generally favourable reviews from music critics. NME rated it 7/10 and professed, "Howling Bells aren't back to their best, but they're within touching distance". Q magazine rated it 3/5 and commented, "Heartstrings lacks the killer song that would bring Howling Bells the success they undoubtedly crave". The album failed to chart in any nation. Howling Bells headlined shows throughout the UK in May and June. They played V Festival in the UK in August and a short series of shows in Australia and New Zealand in September.

=== Hiatus, solo projects and reunions (2014–present) ===
The band became largely inactive through 2015 and 2016. In a Facebook post, Juanita Stein described the band's inactivity as "an unplanned hiatus" while also announcing her launch of a solo career. The band did, however, play a one-off show at the 2017 Margate Wonderland festival at Dreamland Margate, alongside The Kills and Carl Barât.

In November 2017, Joel Stein's solo project, Glassmaps, released their debut album Strangely Addicted. Juanita Stein also went on to solo albums of her own, including America (2017), Until the Lights Fade (2018), Snapshot (2020), and The Weightless Hour (2024).

In January 2022, the band reunited again to perform their debut album in its entirety at a series of live gigs at various venues throughout the UK, including Brighton, Manchester and London. The shows were the band's last with Daines. In September 2025, the band announced their first new music in 11 years in the form of a new single, "Unbroken". Alongside the announcement the band also announced a one-off show at The Lock Tavern, London in November 2025. Their fifth album, Strange Life, is slated for release on February 13, 2026.

== Influences and musical style ==
Members of Howling Bells cited The Beatles, Charles Mingus, Peter Green, Vinnie Colaiuta, and Jimi Hendrix as influences. The catalyst for the change from Waikiki to Howling Bells was Juanita and Joel's trip to see Black Rebel Motorcycle Club in Australia. They saw this band shrouded in red lights, and it created an atmosphere that inspired them to alter their musical direction. The band's style has been compared to that of Siouxsie and the Banshees, PJ Harvey, The Velvet Underground, Nick Cave, and Mazzy Star. Stein has cited female singers such as Siouxsie Sioux, PJ Harvey, Chrissie Hynde and Debbie Harry.

Their music has been called folk rock, melodic blues, and country-goth. Juanita disagrees with the group's gothic characterization.

For [critics] to romanticize this sense of darkness ... It’s just the music we like.

— Juanita Stein referring to being labelled as "Goth"

The style of Howling Bells was greatly influenced by film. The Steins and Picchio have expressed admiration of French films in particular. Juanita has stated that she enjoyed bringing the strange and ethereal energy from those films into their music. To describe the sound of Howling Bells' debut album, critics used terms like dark, brooding, and Americana. NME described it as "the sound of PJ Harvey hitching a ride with The Velvet Underground through Twin Peaks."

"Cities Burning Down" (2009)
The ominous tone of the music reflected in the song "Cities Burning Down," from Howling Bells' second album, Radio Wars.

"Original Sin" (2014)
The third single from Howling Bells' fourth album Heartstrings.

The second album, Radio Wars, in which the band experimented with synthesizers and drum machines, had a more electronic pop sound. They also incorporated arrangements of string and brass into the album. Their goals were to make a different kind of record by exploring other genres of music and to create something more insightful and futuristic. Not unlike the first record, Radio Wars contained elements of dark subject matter. "Cities Burning Down," the darkest track from the album, was a song that Juanita and Moule wrote together. Its lyrics were inspired by the apocalyptic sound of the music, which they created first.

The Loudest Engine features a sound adapted to the genres of folk and rock, more so than the previous two Howling Bells records. Juanita explained that the band relied less on the sound technology that was prominent in Radio Wars, instead returning to the more organic state of Howling Bells. For the new album, Joel was inspired by prog rock and krautrock acts such as Amon Düül and Aphrodite's Child. Howling Bells were inspired by The Doors documentary When You're Strange, which the members watched just before beginning to record The Loudest Engine.

Heartstrings, like the first record, was very much influenced by film, and is recognized for its cinematic quality. Juanita indicated that they deliberately made the album to sound like a soundtrack to a movie. Howling Bells along with the production team watched Paris, Texas and Blue Velvet, in an effort to replicate the mood, emotion, and atmosphere of these two films in particular. Other films that played a significant role in the making of Heartstrings include, Badlands, Bonnie and Clyde, Klute, Léon: The Professional, Nashville, Pleasantville, The Last Picture Show, and Vivre sa vie.

== Discography ==
- Howling Bells (2006)
- Radio Wars (2009)
- The Loudest Engine (2011)
- Heartstrings (2014)
- Strange Life (2026)

== Awards and nominations ==
Year	Category	Institution or publication	Result	Notes	Ref.
2006	Howling Bells	Australian Music Prize	Nominated		
