= The Loudest Engine =

Studio album by Howling Bells
- Released: 9 September 2011
- Recorded: September–October 2010
- Studios: Battle Born, Las Vegas
- Genre: Indie rock
- Length: 41:19
- Label: Cooking Vinyl
- Producer: Mark Stoermer

Howling Bells chronology
| Radio Wars (2009) | ''The Loudest Engine'' (2011) | Heartstrings (2014) |

Singles from The Loudest Engine
- 1. "Into the Sky" Released: 18 July 2011

The Loudest Engine is the third studio album of London-based Australian indie rock band Howling Bells. The album was released through Cooking Vinyl on 9 September 2011 to mostly positive reviews. It was produced by Mark Stoermer and recorded at Battle Born Studios, in Las Vegas from September to October 2010.

Howling Bells began writing for The Loudest Engine more than two years preceding its release while they supported Coldplay on the Viva la Vida Tour. The band sought to capture more closely the essence of its debut album, Howling Bells, and retract from its technically inclined predecessor, Radio Wars. Vocalist and rhythm guitarist Juanita Stein was credited for writing most of the lyrical content on The Loudest Engine. The band moved on from all five record labels it was signed to and established an exclusive partnership with Cooking Vinyl. Only one single, "Into the Sky" was released from the album and it was the first Howling Bells album issued as an LP record. The Australian release and the LP release contain an extra track named "Arrows", which is a demo that was recorded in Sydney. Preceding the release of the album, Howling Bells released a non-physical EP issued via PledgeMusic, titled Invisible. The Loudest Engine appeared on both the UK Albums Chart and the Australian Albums Chart.

Howling Bells characterized The Loudest Engine as a contemporary psychedelic endeavor which was reinforced by the atmosphere of their time spent in the Mojave Desert. To support the album Howling Bells performed a number of headline shows and opened for both Elbow and The Killers. Following this period of time, bass player Brendan Picchio left the band and was subsequently replaced by Gary Daines.

== Background ==
Howling Bells wrote most of the material for The Loudest Engine, while they were on the road supporting Coldplay in May and June 2009. The band returned to Australia later that year and rented a house in Valla Beach to use as a rehearsal space for their new material. Although the band expressed that the album was very much a communal songwriting process with input from drummer Glenn Moule, bass guitarist Brendan Picchio, and guitarist Joel Stein, Joel's sister Juanita Stein was recognised for writing most of the song lyrics on the album. (Note: Songwriting credits for Juanita Stein adapted from ASCAP.) "The Loudest Engine" (the title track) was written about the tour bus that the band used while they toured Europe with Mercury Rev in 2008. Juanita referred to The Loudest Engine as a modern psychedelic record, and one that was more folk and rock than their previous two releases, but which felt like a continuation of their first record, Howling Bells.

On three separate occasions in 2006 and 2007, Howling Bells appeared as the opening support act for The Killers. They connected well with all members of the band, but especially with bassist Mark Stoermer. He and members of Howling Bells discovered that they shared a similar taste in books, film, and music. At the time that the band considered potential producers for the album, Stoermer proposed to Howling Bells the idea that he produce it. The band members liked the concept of a fellow musician as the acting producer, so they agreed. It was Stoermer's first experience as a record producer.

Howling Bells expected the album to be released in 2010, but the record label(s) that the group was previously signed to, which included the UK-based Independiente, preferred the band to write material that it did not so desire. This forced Howling Bells to relinquish from all five of its label partners and proceed to record without being signed to a record label.

== Production & Invisible EP ==
Recording sessions for The Loudest Engine took place at the Killers' Battle Born Studios, in Las Vegas, from September to October 2010. The album was recorded with a Studer A820 2" 24-track reel-to-reel analogue tape machine. After Joel insisted that the album be recorded to tape, Stoermer sought and acquired the recording unit. The band decided to not record anything that they could not perform live, referring to their last album Radio Wars, which was very electronically oriented. Members of the band stated that they had a lot more freedom than ever before in the studio, which is one of the reasons they chose Stoermer as a producer. They knew as a musician that he understood the importance of letting a band just play music instead of pressuring them to push their instrument or sound elsewhere. Stoermer researched autobiographies of record producers, including the book, Recording the Beatles, to use as technical reference points for recording the album.

He’s a fantastic human being and I loved his style of working, it was very free and natural, lots of jams happened, it was a real pleasure.

— Picchio speaking about Stoermer

While not recording, the band members at times ventured onto The Strip, but they also made an effort to experience Las Vegas as locals rather than merely a tourist destination. Howling Bells believed that their Las Vegas surroundings infused the spirit and the ambience of the desert and very much affected the outcome of the music. They spent time jamming on Doors and John Lennon songs, whereupon Stoermer joined them, sometimes filling in on drums. Stoermer also brought his collection of Hitchcock and cult films into the studio late at night and entertained the band with the old movies.

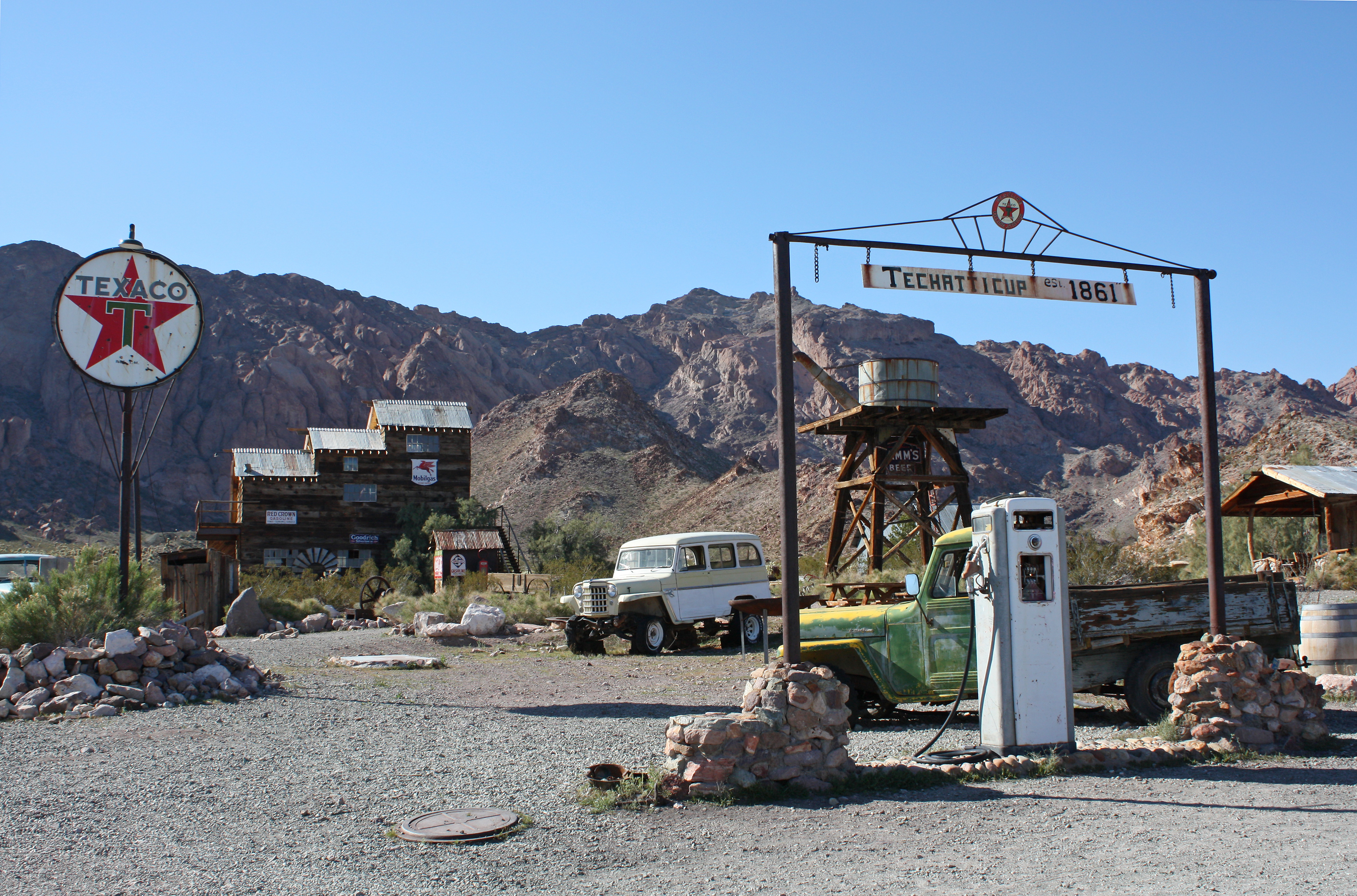
Images for the album were taken at Techatticup Mine near Nelson, Nevada.

Photography for The Loudest Engine was by Heather Hyte, a friend of Stoermer's who spent a lot of time with Howling Bells in Las Vegas. At the end of the recording sessions, the band asked her to take pictures of them in the desert. She also did post-production work and embellished the photos with an array of psychedelic colors. The album was mixed by Robert Root at Battle Born Studios, and was mastered by Greg Calbi at Sterling Sound, in New York. (Note: Credits according to album notes.) In 2011, Howling Bells were for the first time under contract to a single record label, after they signed with the UK-based Cooking Vinyl.

Invisible EP

Prior to the release of The Loudest Engine, Howling Bells released a downloadable EP issued through PledgeMusic, dubbed Invisible. It contained four audio tracks plus a short behind the scenes video of the band's recording sessions in Las Vegas. Two of the tracks, "Invisible" and "Arrows", were included on The Loudest Engine. The latter, a demo recorded in a house in Sydney, was included on the LP and Australian releases only. The two other tracks were "Midnight Cowboy" and "Crossroads", a demo recorded at GFI Studios, in Ontario, New York during the Viva la Vida Tour. Invisible was released on 9 May 2011, on the last night of a short three-date stint of the UK to promote the EP.

== Singles ==
"Into the Sky" (2011)
The only single released from Howling Bells' third album, The Loudest Engine.

One single was issued from The Loudest Engine, "Into the Sky" (July 2011). Juanita wrote the lyrics herself while in Sydney, about someone close to her that she missed who was constantly travelling. The instrumentation for the single originated when Juanita created a guitar riff and played it to Picchio, at which point he composed the bass parts. Lindsay McDougall, guitarist for Frenzal Rhomb and Triple J radio presenter, noted to Juanita as he interviewed her for his radio show, that the song's bass line resembled that of "The Peter Gunn Theme". The accompanying music video was directed by Ollie Murray, and filmed at a studio in North London in July 2011.

== Release and reception ==
Professional ratings
Aggregate scores
| Source | Rating |
|---|---|
| Metacritic | 59/100 |
Review scores
| Source | Rating |
| Allmusic | 3.5/5 stars |
| Clash | 7/10 stars |
| Loud and Quiet | 4/10 stars |
| MusicOMH | 3/5 stars |
| New Zealand Herald | 4/5 stars |
| Sydney Morning Herald | 4/5 stars |
| State | (unfavourable) |
| The Fly | 4/5 stars |
| The Mercury | 4/5 stars |
| This Is Fake DIY | 7/10 stars |

The Loudest Engine was first released in Australia on 9 September 2011, and in additional countries in the weeks and months that followed. It was the group's first album released as an LP after the rights were licensed to the vinyl only record label, Music on Vinyl, out of the Netherlands, which issued it as a high quality 180 gram audiophile LP. The second week of its release, the album appeared inside the Top 30 on the UK Indie Chart, and just outside the Top 150 on the regular UK Albums Chart. It appeared on the Australian Albums Chart, in the physical release category just inside the Top 100. Corresponding with the release of the album, Howling Bells played a six-city tour of the UK. They opened shows for Elbow throughout Europe in November, and following this performed headline shows in Australia in December. After the Australian tour, Picchio left the band and was later replaced by English bass guitarist Gary Daines. The next two years Howling Bells held a sparse schedule of eight shows. They performed at the 2012 Hop Farm Festival and supported The Killers for a series of shows in February 2013.

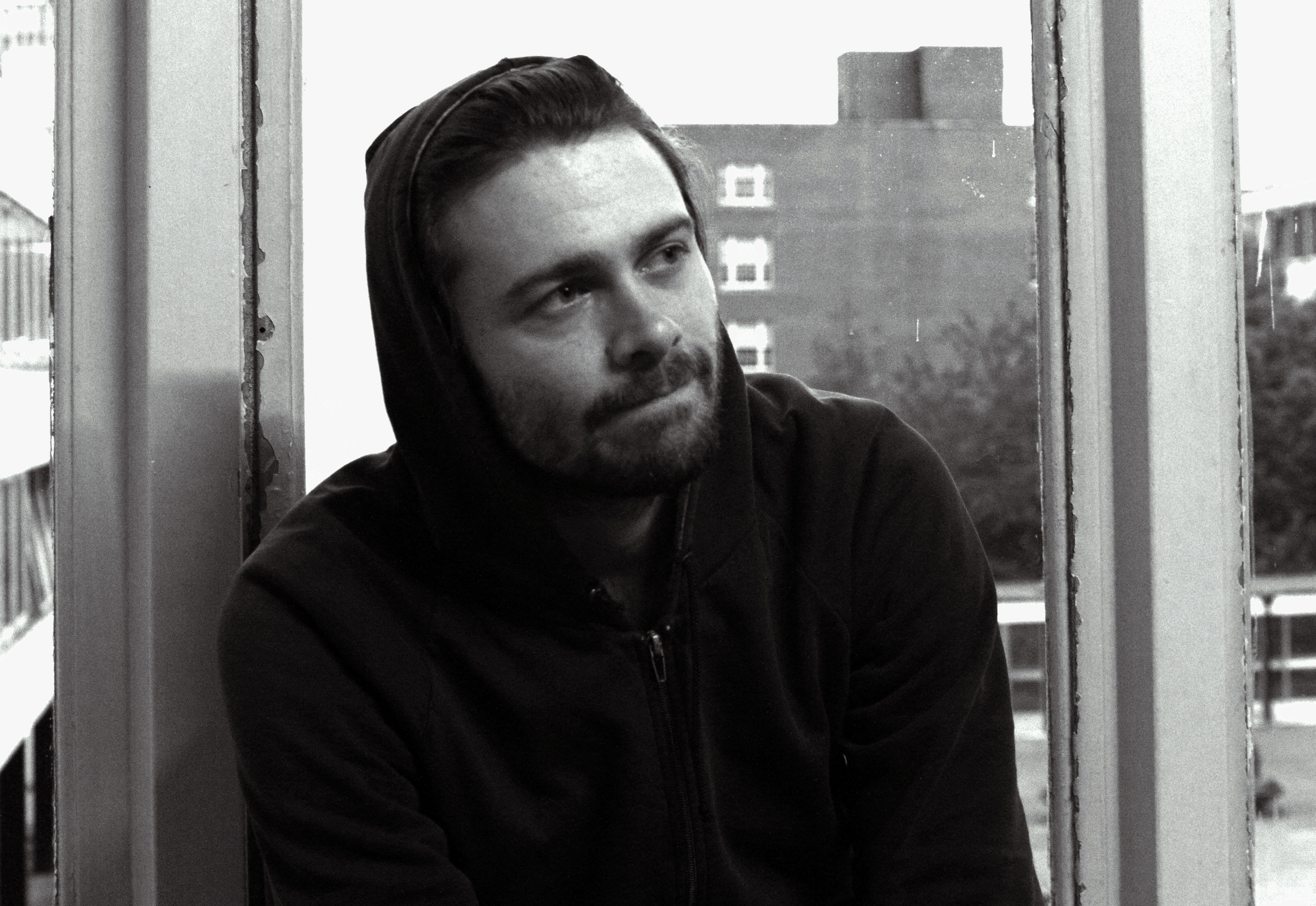
Three months preceding his departure from the band, Picchio gives an interview backstage at Manchester Academy 3, September 2011.

The Loudest Engine received mostly favourable reviews from music critics, but there were a certain amount of music critics who felt otherwise and consequently panned it. Upon its release, Chris Phillips from the Live at the Vault show on BRfm 97.3 called it one of the best albums of the year. Luke McNaney of The Music Fix rated it 8/10 and praised the album, using terms like "swooning melodies", "beguilingly sexy rock", and "prowling guitars". He appreciated the final third of the album the most, and declared "the band have proved their belltower remains a den of intoxicating noise." Scott Causer of Contactmusic rated it 7/10 and expected to hear Stoermer produce an album full of indie anthem pop songs, similar to those of The Killers, but was surprised to instead hear a darker creation. He ended his review by stating that "Howling Bells are one of the most interesting bands in the world right now and should be cherished as such." Tom O'Donovan of V Music acknowledged that Juanita stood out from her female-fronted counterparts and praised her vocal capacity for its diverse range. He referred to The Loudest Engine as "a promising record displaying a real maturity." Denis Semchenko of Rave Magazine rated the album 3.5/5 and noted that the opening track "Charlatan" and lead single "Into the Sky" were among the band's most distinguished guitar riffs yet, although he thought the album would have benefited from more stylistic diversity.

Chris Jones of The Line Of Best Fit said that "at times The Loudest Engine falls flat", but labelled it "periodically enjoyable nevertheless". He too cited "Charlatan" and "Into the Sky" amongst their strongest efforts to date, and credited "Don't Run" and "The Faith" as the most tuneful songs from the album. He designated it to be a strong EP's worth of material but felt that the album as a whole fell short. Jones concluded his review by stating "Howling Bells have more than earned our patience and show enough here to encourage its retention – the worry is whether they’re starting to run out of chances." Chris Lo of BBC Music expressed positive feelings towards "The Wilderness" and "Invisible", but referred to "Gold Suns, White Guns" as a "Kate Bush-aping misstep", and claimed that overall the album felt "laboured and, at worst, contrived." He finished his review by asserting "Instead of capturing the essence of the dusty trail, on this album they are struggling just to avoid the middle of the road." Sophie Williams of Stereoboard liked the vibe of "The Loudest Engine" (the title track), but was another critic who mentioned that the album seemed flat, and adding that it felt "almost distant". In the end, she accused the band of "trying to be a genre they are not."

== Track listing ==
All lyrics are written by Juanita Stein except where shown

| No. | Title | Writer(s) | Length |
|---|---|---|---|
| 1. | "Charlatan" | | 2:53 |
| 2. | "Into the Sky" | | 3:05 |
| 3. | "The Wilderness" | | 4:01 |
| 4. | "Secrets" | | 3:18 |
| 5. | "Don't Run" | | 3:32 |
| 6. | "The Faith" | | 2:56 |
| 7. | "Live On" | | 3:26 |
| 8. | "The Loudest Engine" | | 4:34 |
| 9. | "Gold Suns, White Guns" | Juanita Stein, Joel Stein (Note: Songwriting credits for Joel Stein adapted from ASCAP.) | 3:32 |
| 10. | "Sioux" | | 3:27 |
| 11. | "Baby Blue" | | 3:07 |
| 12. | "Invisible" | | 3:28 |
| Total length: | | | 41:19 |

Bonus track (LP and Australian CD release)
| No. | Title | Length |
|---|---|---|
| 1. | "Arrows" | 3:30 |

== Personnel ==
Howling Bells members

- Juanita Stein – vocals, rhythm guitar
- Joel Stein – lead guitar
- Brendan Picchio – bass guitar
- Glenn Moule – drums, percussion

Production

- Mark Stoermer – producer
- Robert Root – mixing engineer
- Greg Calbi – mastering engineer
- Luke Insect – design/illustration
- Heather Hyte – photography

== Charts ==
| Chart (2011) | Peak position |
|---|---|
| Australian Albums Chart | 96 |
| UK Indie Chart | 27 |
| UK Albums Chart | 151 |

== Release history ==
| Region | Date | Label | Format | Catalogue No. |
|---|---|---|---|---|
| Australia | 9 September 2011 | Cooking Vinyl | CD | COOKCD546 |
| New Zealand | 12 September 2011 | Cooking Vinyl | CD | COOKCD546 |
| UK | 12 September 2011 | Cooking Vinyl | CD | COOKCD546 |
| France | 19 September 2011 | Cooking Vinyl | CD | COOKCD546 |
| Germany | 30 September 2011 | Cooking Vinyl | CD | COOKCD546 |
| Italy | 18 October 2011 | Cooking Vinyl | CD | COOKCD546 |
| Netherlands | 5 December 2011 | Music on Vinyl | LP | MOVLP459 |
| N. America | 28 February 2012 | TeenAgeRiot Music | Download | TARM002D |
