= Waikiki (band) =

Rock group from Sydney, Australia

- Origin: Sydney, Australia
- Genre: Rock
- Years active: 1999–2003
- Label: Liberation Music
- Past members: Juanita Stein; Joel Stein; Glenn Moule; Jimmy Brandon

Waikiki were a rock group from Sydney, Australia, consisting of sister and brother Juanita Stein (bass/vocals) and Joel Stein (guitar/vocals), and Glenn Moule (drums) and Jimmy (or Jimmeh) Brandon (guitar). A new bass player Brendan Picchio joined the band in early 2003, replacing Brandon, with Juanita Stein moving from bass to rhythm guitar. In August 2003, Joel Stein explained the impact Picchio had made on the group. He told Radio Adelaide's Hermione Gilchrist that the new bassist was "the missing piece to the puzzle", adding, "he's what we've been looking for since we started."

In early 2004 the group disbanded, moved to London and re-formed as Howling Bells.

Waikiki released one album, I'm Already Home, in 2002. Their single, "Here Comes September", placed 36th on the 2002 Triple J Hottest 100 poll. They released three further singles and a five-track EP.

== Discography ==
=== Albums ===
List of albums, with selected chart positions
Title	Details	Peak chart positions
Title	Details	AUS
I'm Already Home	Released: 2002; Label: Liberation Music (Cat No. LIBCD4050.2); Format: CD	43

=== Extended plays ===
- Presents... (Liberation Music, 2000)

=== Singles ===
List of singles, with selected chart positions
Title	Year	Peak chart positions	Album
Title	Year	AUS	Album
"New Technology"	2002	61	I'm Already Home
"Here Comes September"	2002	38	I'm Already Home
"Lucky"	2002	—	I'm Already Home
"Complicated"	2003	51	I'm Already Home

=== Compilation appearances ===
- Hits from the Box: An Aristotles Box Compilation (MGM Distribution Australia, 2000) – "Bracelet"
