= Ken Nelson (British music producer) =

- Born: Ken Nelson; 6 February 1959 (age 67)
- Origin: Liverpool, England
- Occupation: Record producer
- Website: www.kennelson.co.uk

Ken Nelson (born 6 February 1959) is an English record producer, who was born in Liverpool. After several years working on demos and independent artists, he achieved success with Gomez, and worldwide success with the first Coldplay recording. He has also worked with Badly Drawn Boy, Howling Bells, the Charlatans, Kings of Convenience, the Orange Lights, Ray LaMontagne, Snow Patrol, Paolo Nutini, and Deadbeat Darling.

He has won three Grammy Awards, two Mercury Music Prizes, and was Music Week magazine's Producer of the Year in 2003.

== Selected discography ==
- 1998: Gomez – Bring It On
- 1999: Gomez – Liquid Skin
- 2000: Badly Drawn Boy – The Hour of Bewilderbeast
- 2000: Coldplay – Parachutes
- 2001: Kings of Convenience – Quiet Is the New Loud
- 2002: Coldplay – A Rush of Blood to the Head
- 2005: Coldplay – X&Y
- 2005: Feeder – Pushing the Senses
- 2006: Howling Bells – Howling Bells
- 2006: Paolo Nutini – These Streets
- 2011: The Gift – Explode
- 2012: Deadbeat Darling – The Angels Share
- 2013: Okean Elzy
