= Howling Bells (album) =

2006 studio album by Howling Bells

Studio album by Howling Bells
- Released: 8 May 2006
- Recorded: 2005
- Studios: Parr Street, Liverpool
- Genre: Indie rock
- Length: 42:19
- Label: Bella Union
- Producer: Ken Nelson

Howling Bells chronology
Howling Bells (2006)	Radio Wars (2009)

Singles from Howling Bells
- 1. "Low Happening" Released: 7 December 2005; 2. "Wishing Stone" Released: 27 February 2006; 3. "Blessed Night" Released: 1 May 2006; 4. "Setting Sun" Released: 18 September 2006

Howling Bells is the self-titled debut album by London-based Australian indie rock band Howling Bells. It was released through Bella Union in the UK on 8 May 2006. The album was produced, engineered, and mixed by Ken Nelson and recorded at Parr Street Studios, Liverpool, in early 2005.

Howling Bells was predominantly written by vocalist and rhythm guitarist Juanita Stein, with the majority of its themes revolving around her relationships and feelings of affection. Most of the songs were demoed in Australia but all were recorded in England, as the band relocated there to work with Ken Nelson. Five singles were released from the album, four of which appeared on the UK Singles Chart. The album peaked in the Top 100 in the UK and just outside the Top 50 in Australia. It was, at the time, the fastest-selling album on the Bella Union label, and it appeared on album-of-the-year lists in eight different publications. In 2006, Howling Bells was a finalist for the Australian Music Prize and a nominee for the Shortlist Music Prize. The 12-track set features a wide array of music styles, including rock, pop, country, folk, and blues.

Howling Bells performed at numerous club shows and festivals around the world to promote the album. They supported various artists, including Editors, Mercury Rev, Placebo, Snow Patrol, and the Killers. In general, Howling Bells was received extremely well by music critics. Those who reviewed it less favourably argued that the album's content was superficial and that the songs were repetitive at times.

== Background ==
Most of the song lyrics on Howling Bells were written by Juanita Stein when she took time off from the band's previous incarnation, the Sydney-based pop rock group Waikiki. All members of Howling Bells were also in Waikiki. After growing discontent with their pop rock sound, the band members opted to assume an indie rock identity and changed their name to Howling Bells. The group began to perform material from Howling Bells while still called Waikiki. The majority of the lyrical subject matter centres on Juanita's own interpersonal relationships. She wrote some songs about the loss felt through ending relationships and others about forming new romance. Afterward, drummer Glenn Moule, guitarist Joel Stein, and bass guitarist Brendan Picchio arranged the music around her words.

We wanted to let the music breathe and get away from our urban environment, so we tracked down this beautiful house.

— Juanita referring to their demoing location in Victoria.

The band found a country house in the mountains of Victoria, where they spent a month creating demo tracks for the album. "Broken Bones" and "Blessed Night" were the only two tracks not to be demoed in Australia. "I'm Not Afraid", the album's last track, was written by Peter Stein (Joel and Juanita's father), who is also a songwriter and musician.

After hearing Coldplay's A Rush of Blood to the Head, they agreed that was how they wanted their album to sound. They sent demos to Ken Nelson, who was responsible for producing A Rush of Blood to the Head. Nelson soon responded, stating that he would be interested in working with them. With little financial security, they relocated to London and waited for Nelson to finish production on Coldplay's X&Y. The start date of the recording of Howling Bells was repeatedly delayed because Coldplay was dissatisfied with its studio sessions. In the meantime, to support themselves, the members of Howling Bells took up temporary work. Eight to ten months after their arrival in England, Nelson contacted them with the news that he would soon be ready to record.

== Recording and getting signed ==
In early 2005, the band started recording Howling Bells at Parr Street Studios in Liverpool. Some of Coldplay's equipment from the X&Y sessions was still in the facility when Howling Bells arrived. They recorded Howling Bells in two to three months, with all the main vocal and instrument tracking done in real time, as if in a live setting. This was a staple of Nelson's recording approach. Due to the personal significance of her songs, Juanita had the studio lights turned off in order to make the recording experience feel more private. The band appreciated Nelson's techniques and studio abilities. They stated that he was great sonically and very adept at de-emphasising some songs that they had initially approached overzealously. They also expressed that they felt fortunate to have had the opportunity to work with the award-winning producer.

As of July 2005, Howling Bells were not yet signed to a label. An associate of the band passed a copy of the album to Simon Raymonde, co-founder of Bella Union. Howling Bells signed to that label because of its genuine concern for the music and not for only its commercial viability. They also signed with Liberation to release the album in Australia. After a year, the band left Bella Union, with whom it had a one-record only contract agreement. In 2008, Howling Bells signed to work with Independiente and released their follow-up album, Radio Wars, through that label. After signing a deal with Nettwerk Music Group, Radio Wars became Howling Bells' first album released in North America.

== Singles ==
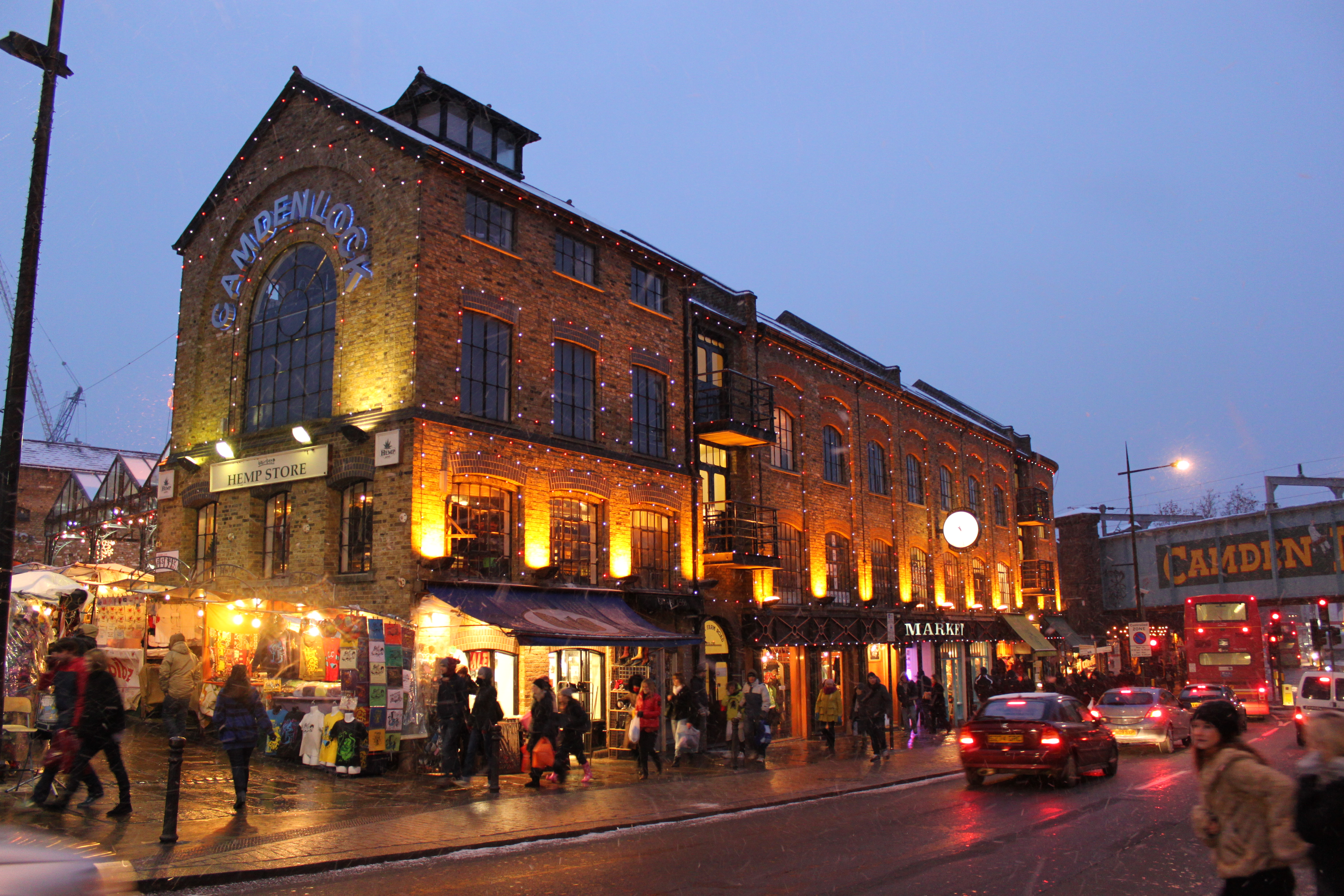
Scenes from the second music video for "Low Happening" were filmed in Camden Market.

The release of Howling Bells was preceded by three singles, "Low Happening" (December 2005), "Wishing Stone" (February 2006), and "Blessed Night" (May 2006). A total of five singles were released from the album, which included "Low Happening" being issued twice. Four of the album's singles appeared on the UK Singles Chart, but none reached the Top 100. Lead single "Low Happening" was the only single released from the album that appeared on the Australian Singles Chart. It surfaced for two weeks, where it peaked at no. 76. The song's lyrics were written solely by Juanita. It was the first Howling Bells song she ever wrote, and it is about a dysfunctional relationship. The music video that accompanied "Low Happening" was directed by Josh Logue for Mathematics and was shot at the Enmore Theatre in Sydney. Its director of photography, Francesco Biffone, won a Silver ACS Award for cinematography. "Low Happening" was re-issued in March 2007, where it served as the album's final single. A second music video for the song was produced to accommodate the release. It was filmed at the Barfly in Camden and directed by Dan Sully for Rebel Monk. NME placed it among the Top 30 songs of 2007. That year, the single was included on the soundtrack for Rugby 08, a video game released by EA Sports.

"Low Happening" (2005)
Howling Bells' debut single, released in 2005 and re-released in 2007, was called "a primal, almost raw blending of blues with dirty rock 'n' roll".

The lyrics for the album's second single, "Wishing Stone", were co-written by Juanita and Joel. First, Juanita wrote much of the song's verse. Then, Joel added the chorus melody, and she wrote the chords around that. Moule constructed the drum sequence and Picchio added the bass parts last. The music video for "Wishing Stone" was filmed in Berlin. "Blessed Night" was the third single released from Howling Bells, and it was also co-written by Juanita and Joel. The accompanying music video was shot from inside a 1976 Buick LeSabre Custom Coupe. The filming took place in Weybridge, Surrey, under the direction of Dan Fernbach for Static Films. The album's fourth single, "Setting Sun" (September 2006), was co-written by Juanita and Picchio. It is the only song from the album in which Juanita wrote not about a personal experience but about her feelings on the universe in general. The music video for "Setting Sun" was shot at the Coronet Theatre in London. It, too, was directed by Dan Fernbach for Static. The music publication NME placed "Setting Sun" among the top 50 songs of 2006. "Broken Bones" is one of seven songs from the album whose lyrics were written solely by Juanita. It was rumoured to have been released as a single in Australia, but there is no evidence to suggest that it was issued on a physical medium. Nevertheless, a video was made for the song and was filmed in New Zealand during the first week of October 2006. It was directed by Adam Jones for Zoomslide.

== Artwork ==
Finnish-born graphic artist Mikko Rantanen created all the album's artwork and the single covers for "Low Happening" and "Blessed Night". He was also responsible for the illustration and design of Howling Bells' website at the time. While looking through an art design magazine, Juanita came across a page that had Rantanen's artwork on it. She recognised it to be a reflection of the Howling Bells sound, so she sent him a copy of the album, and he designed illustrations for it based on his interpretation of the music.

== Promotion, release and reception ==
Professional ratings
Review scores
Source	Rating
AllMusic	3.5/5 stars
dB Magazine	(favourable)
Drowned in Sound	8/10 stars
Gigwise	4/5 stars
musicOMH	5/5 stars
NME	9/10 stars
Pitchfork	(7.8/10)
Playlouder	3.5/5 stars
SoundsXP	(favourable)
Yahoo! Music	7/10 stars

Prior to the release of Howling Bells, the band toured extensively. They played club shows in Australia and in North America. Howling Bells toured Europe and the UK with Editors and The Cinematics. They procured club dates with many artists, including The Slits, The Kooks and ¡Forward, Russia!. The group played at emerging artist events, Camden Crawl, and the NME New Music Tour. After the release of the album, Howling Bells toured heavily, performing at clubs and in various festivals. They played at Bella Union's tenth anniversary party and supported various artists, including Placebo, Snow Patrol and The Killers. Attendance at their shows steadily increased during this period, during which they went from having small audiences to selling out venues.

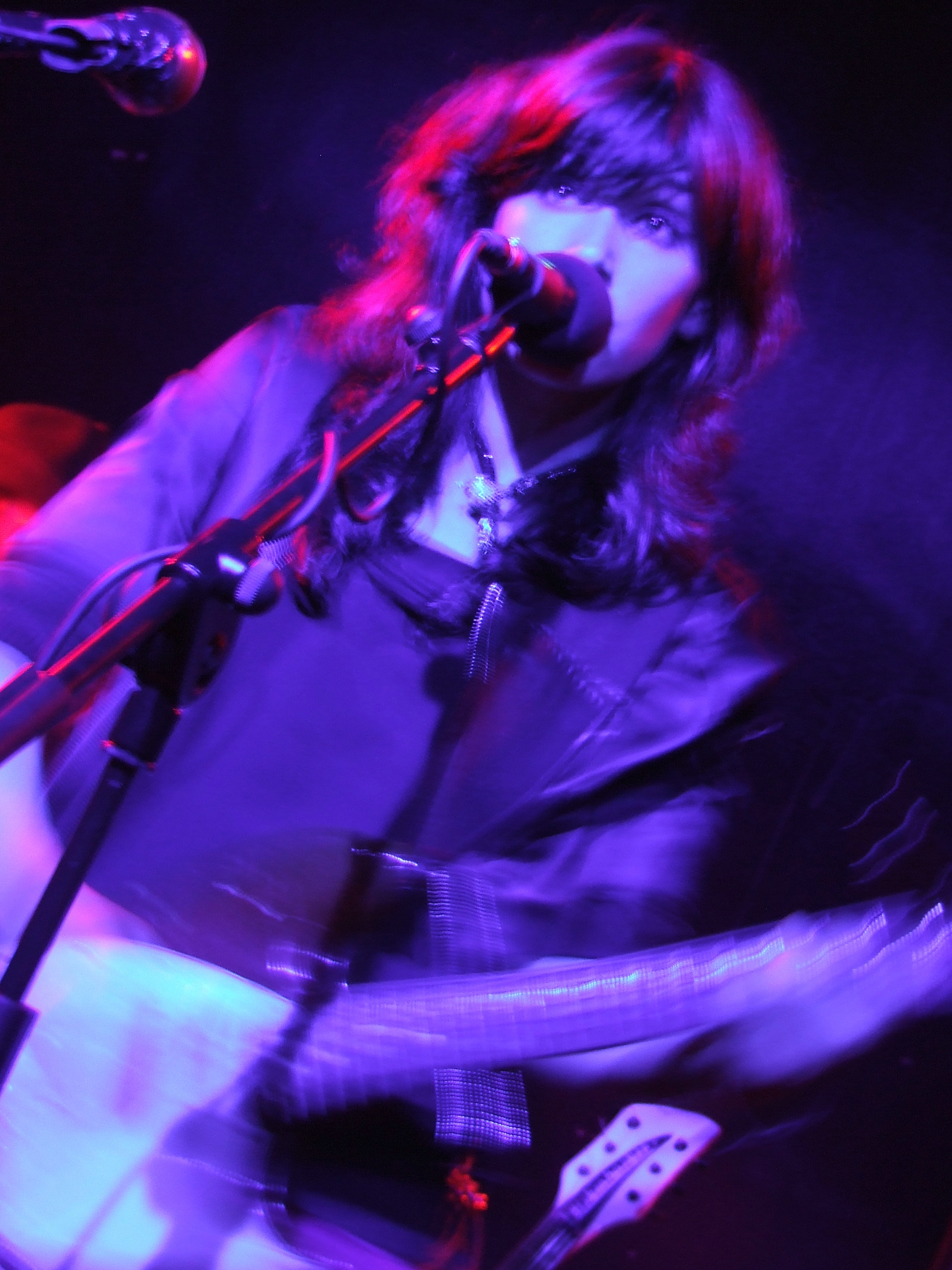
Juanita Stein, Newcastle Academy, 2006

Howling Bells was released on 8 May 2006 in the United Kingdom through Bella Union and on 1 July in Australia through Liberation. It appeared for two weeks on the UK Albums Chart, where it peaked in the Top 100. It also appeared for two weeks on the Australian Albums Chart, where it peaked just outside the Top 50. The release was, at the time, officially declared the fastest selling album on the Bella Union label. It sold 8,000 copies within the first two weeks, and by October, 25,000 copies had been sold. In a competition that is artist or label self-nominated, Howling Bells was one of nine finalists out nearly 200 nominees for the 2006 Australian Music Prize Award (AMP). The eventual winner was Moo, You Bloody Choir by Augie March. A panel of entertainment industry members and journalists nominated Howling Bells for the 2006 Shortlist Music Prize. The eventual winner of that award was The Greatest by Cat Power. Howling Bells appeared on album of the year lists in multiple publications. It also received a spot on a Top 66 Albums of 2000–2006 list. Retail outlet Piccadilly Records placed it in the Top 20 of its end-of-the-year list.

Howling Bells was met with overall positive reviews from music critics. It was recognised for its effective combination of elements of pop, country, blues and rock. Niall O'Keeffe of Yahoo! Music noted its depth and range and compared it to the music of Hope Sandoval. He went on to say, "A debut album couldn't be more sophisticated if it wore a beret and smoked filterless French cigarettes while reading Rimbaud by candlelight." Chris Waugh of ILikeMusic admired Joel's guitar playing, calling it "brilliantly inventive." He also praised the band's ability to write what he called "brooding and killer" verses and choruses. He ended by saying the album was "a truly special debut by a truly special band, and you should let it start seeping into your consciousness now." Richard Hughes of CD Times drew comparisons to My Bloody Valentine, PJ Harvey and a David Lynch movie soundtrack. He warned, "You'll find yourself following their path down the dark side of rock 'n roll."

Less favourable reviews came from David Renshaw of Wears the Trousers Magazine, who said, "Occasionally, the songs are repetitive, and with summer supposedly in full swing, this album is not one for the barbeque." However, he added that the band possesses the unique ability to transport the listener to another world. Tim DiGravina of Allmusic wrote that "shallow subject matter, often goofy rhyming lyrics, and a heavy-handed use of falsetto sometimes sidetracks the album as a whole." He also argued that "The Night is Young" stole structural elements and the guitar conclusion of Coldplay's "Yellow". However, he added that "the good ultimately outweighs the bad, making for a flawed but still satisfying debut." Emily Mackay of Playlouder compared the band with The Duke Spirit, Sons and Daughters and Tarnation, and she commented, "Howling Bells have crafted a unique, glossy, gothic gloom." She finished with a word of caution: "It veers close, however, to being too polished ... Howling Bells run the risk of being just picturesque melancholy."

== Track listing ==
All lyrics are written by Juanita Stein except where shown (Note: Songwriting credits for Juanita Stein adapted from ASCAP.)

No.	Title	Writer(s)	Length
1.	"The Bell Hit"		3:15
2.	"Velvet Girl"		3:19
3.	"Low Happening"		3:04
4.	"Broken Bones"		3:19
5.	"Wishing Stone"	Juanita Stein, Joel Stein (Note: Songwriting credits for Joel Stein adapted from ASCAP.)	3:32
6.	"A Ballad for the Bleeding Hearts"		3:41
7.	"The Night is Young"		3:50
8.	"Across the Avenue"		4:01
9.	"Setting Sun"	Juanita Stein, B. Picchio (Note: Songwriting credits for Brendan Picchio adapted from ASCAP.)	3:50
10.	"Blessed Night"	Juanita Stein, Joel Stein	3:16
11.	"In the Woods"	Juanita Stein, Joel Stein	4:27
12.	"I'm Not Afraid"	Peter Stein (Note: Songwriting credits for Peter Stein adapted from ASCAP.)	2:45
Total length:			42:19

== Personnel ==
Howling Bells members (Note: Credits according to album notes. Additional keyboards, noises and harmonies by Juanita, Joel, Picchio, Moule, Hart, Nelson, Phythian and Withnail.)

- Juanita Stein – vocals, rhythm guitar
- Joel Stein – lead guitar, vocals
- Brendan Picchio – bass guitar
- Glenn Moule – drums, percussion

Additional musicians

- Mark Hart – keyboards, piano

Production

- Ken Nelson – producer, recording engineer, mixing engineer
- Mark Phythian – recording engineer
- John Withnail – assistant recording engineer

== Release history, charts, accolades ==
Release history

Country	Date	Label	Format	Catalogue No.
UK	8 May 2006	Bella Union	CD	BELLACD114
Australia	1 July 2006	Liberation	CD	LIBCD7173.2

Singles chart

Year	Single	Peak position	
Year	Single	UK	AUS
2005	"Low Happening"	—	76
2006	"Wishing Stone"	101	—
2006	"Blessed Night"	105	—
2006	"Setting Sun"	114	—
2007	"Low Happening"(re-issue)	115	—
"—" denotes release that did not chart or was not released.

Album chart

Chart (2006)	Peak position
Australian Albums Chart	53
UK Albums Chart	92

Country	Accolade (2006)	Provider	Ranking		
AUS	Australian Music Prize	AMP	2–9		
UK	Top 66 Albums of 2000–2006	Drowned in Sound	59		
UK	Album of the Year	musicOMH	2		
UK	Album of the Year	Sound Generator	2		
UK	Album of the Year	Drowned in Sound	3		
UK	Album of the Year	NME	11		
UK	Album of the Year	CLUAS	19		
UK	Album of the Year	Piccadilly Records	19		
UK	Album of the Year	Playlouder	49		
UK	Album of the Year	The Guardian	50		
UK	Album of the Year	US	† Shortlist Music Prize	shôrt–lĭst	11–61
"†" denotes award nomination of album in country of non-release.
