= Radio Wars =

Studio album by Howling Bells
- Released: 2 March 2009
- Recorded: September 2007, January–July 2008
- Studios: Sing Sing, Melbourne; Sound Factory, Hollywood; AIR, London; Mayfair, London
- Genre: Indie rock
- Length: 43:51
- Label: Independiente
- Producers: Dan Grech-Marguerat, Howling Bells

Howling Bells chronology
| Howling Bells (2006) | Radio Wars (2009) | The Loudest Engine (2011) |

Singles from Radio Wars
- 1. "Into the Chaos" Released: 17 November 2008; 2. "Cities Burning Down" Released: 23 February 2009; 3. "Digital Hearts" Released: 18 May 2009

Radio Wars is the second studio album by London-based Australian indie rock band Howling Bells. It was released through Independiente in the United Kingdom on 2 March 2009 to mixed reviews. Recorded at four different studios, it was produced by Dan Grech-Marguerat except one track by Howling Bells.

Songwriting efforts for Radio Wars were provided by all four members of the band. The album's themes encompass a wide range of topics, from chaos and optimism to unity and the technological revolution. Most songs were demoed in Australia with one recorded in Melbourne, three in London, and the rest in Los Angeles. The album was the band's first physical release issued outside of the UK and Australia. Three singles were issued from Radio Wars, but all failed to chart. The album peaked within the Top 30 on the Australian Albums Chart and just outside the Top 50 on the UK Albums Chart. Although listed as containing ten tracks, the sixth, "Ms. Bell's Song/Radio Wars Theme", is two separate pieces of music. Additionally, a hidden track, "To LA", is omitted from the booklet and back cover. Musically, the album contains elements of rock, pop, blues, folk, and electronica, with songs that range from synthesised percussion rhythms to crooning 1950s style balladry.

To promote the album, the band played a free show at retail outlet Fopp Records, in London, on the day of the UK release. The following week, they played another free show in London, this time sponsored by NME. While touring Radio Wars, Howling Bells supported The Duke Spirit, Mercury Rev, Razorlight, and Coldplay.

== Background ==
Radio Wars was a collective songwriting effort among drummer Glenn Moule, bass guitarist Brendan Picchio, guitarist Joel Stein, and Joel's sister, vocalist and rhythm guitarist, Juanita Stein. The majority of the songwriting on Howling Bells, their debut album, was provided by Juanita. For Radio Wars, members collaborated in the rehearsal studio whenever they could find time. Yet, while touring to support their debut album, the four members wrote much of the new material on laptops. In August 2007, they all brought their songs to a listening party at Juanita and Joel's parents' house in Australia and selected the songs that they would work on. They sought out a country home in Victoria where they recorded fifteen to twenty demos of their new material. At this demoing location, attempts to tune into radio stations to capture a regular signal generated unstable and erratic reception – referred to as 'radio wars' by the band. This provided ideas for two of the tracks, "Radio Wars Theme" and "Digital Hearts" and the album's name.

In 2007, Howling Bells departed from Bella Union, the UK record label that had released their eponymous debut album. The band declined the option of signing to a major label for the release of Radio Wars. Discussions with major labels had affirmed that their objective was for the band to continue to write the same kind of music from their first record. The band opposed the idea of someone dictating to them the type of material that they should be creating. In January 2008, Howling Bells brokered a deal with, Independiente, since the record label's main focus was for music rather than money. The group maintained their relationship with Liberation, which issued the album in Australia. Radio Wars became the band's first album issued outside of the UK and Australia after they signed with Play It Again Sam, which released the album in Europe, Hostess Entertainment, which released the album in Japan, and Nettwerk Music Group, which released the album in North America.

== Recording ==
In early September 2007, work on Radio Wars started when the band re-recorded and self-produced, "Cities Burning Down", at Sing Sing Studios, Melbourne. Previously titled "This City's Burning", it had appeared as the b-side on the 2006 singles, "Low Happening" and "Wishing Stone". They felt the song needed more life, so extra instrumentation was added to deliver a bigger sound. As "Cities Burning Down", it became the album's second track.

Howling Bells sought a producer that had experience working on electronic-sounding records. Producer and mixer, Dan Grech-Marguerat, who had previously worked with Howling Bells' manager, had listened to demos of the new tracks. The band knew of his collaborations with Radiohead and Air, and thought he could help develop their new sound. He came to their rehearsal studio with handwritten notes about the new songs and expressed what he could add. This encouraged the band, and they agreed to let him produce the album.

Dan challenged us a lot as well, which we’ve never had before. He had a lot of inspiring ideas. Basically it was like he was part of the band for the duration of the time we were working with him, which was really, really good.

— Joel referring to Dan Grech-Marguerat.

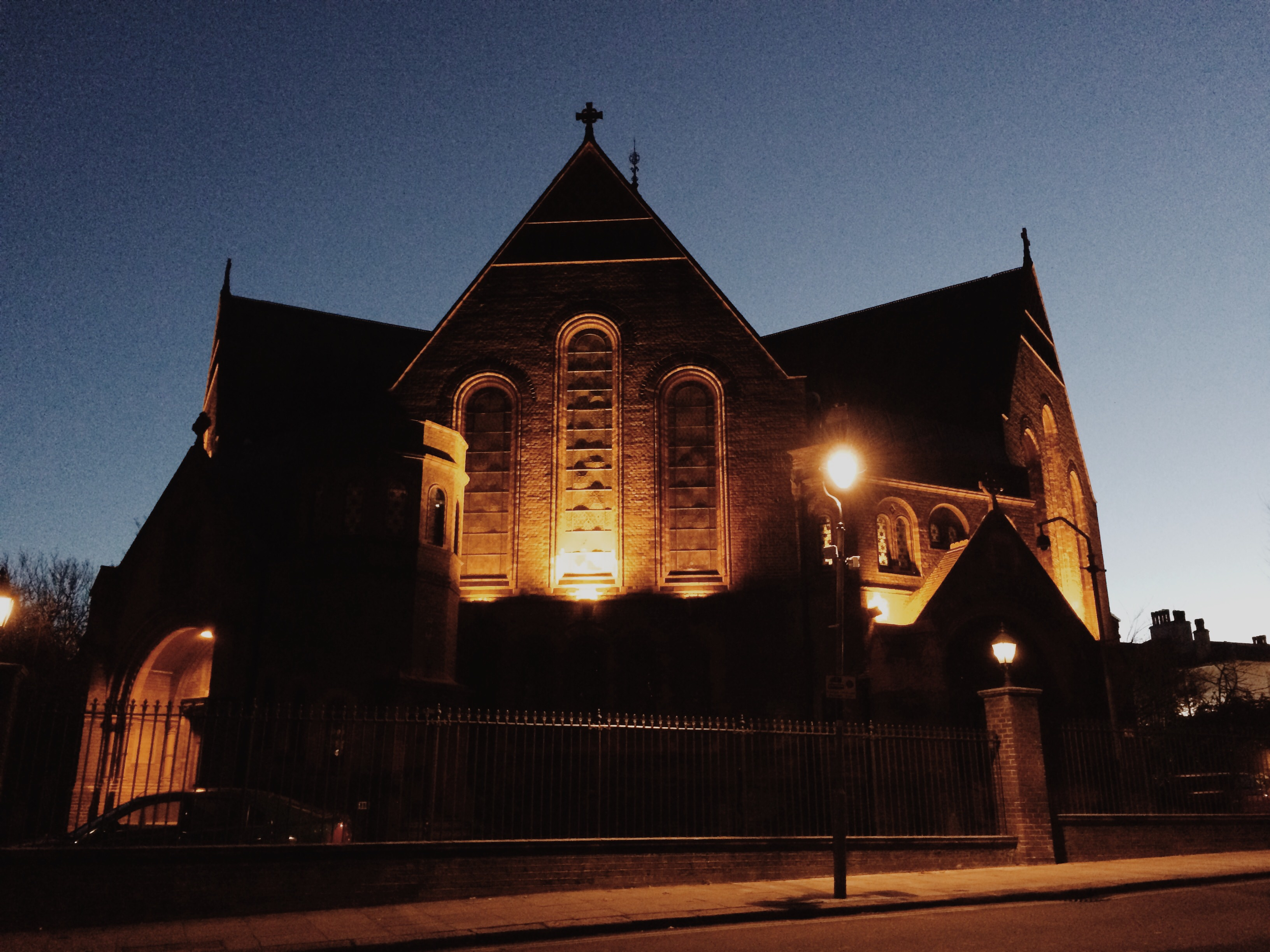
Portions of Radio Wars were recorded at AIR Studios, in the northern London suburb of Hampstead.

In January 2008, Howling Bells recorded more tracks for Radio Wars, now working at The Sound Factory, in Los Angeles. The band chose Los Angeles as they wanted a recording experience which was different from previous sessions. Radio Wars was about Howling Bells being optimistic and united in spirit. Looking to bring a more colourful perspective with a new sound and new feel, the group opted for a more electronic texture. Picchio and Joel experimented with synthesisers, and Moule's percussion parts were more distinct than his previous work. Grech-Marguerat worked prolonged hours and experimented considerably, in an effort to bring more life to each song. The band often struggled with ideas that were presented by him, and the recording sessions were burdened by occasional arguments. Though, members of the band attested that it ultimately worked out.

Five of the demos created for Radio Wars were not used on the final product. Just over half the songs that appeared on the album were recorded in LA: "Treasure Hunt", "Nightingale", "Ms. Bell's Song/Radio Wars Theme", "Golden Web", "Into the Chaos" (minus the strings), and the hidden track, "To LA". After the band returned from Los Angeles, they recorded "It Ain't You", "Let's Be Kids", and "Digital Hearts" at AIR Studios in London. Session musicians recorded string and brass instruments for a number of the tracks at Mayfair Studios. The last song to be recorded for Radio Wars was a 1950s style ballad entitled "How Long", which Joel had written the lyrics for. The rest of the band liked it, so arrangements were made to go back into a non-specified London studio where they spent two days recording it. Twenty-two songs had been created by the end of their recording sessions, in July 2008. The album was mixed by Cenzo Townshend at Olympic Studios.

== Singles ==
"Into the Chaos" (2008)
The album's lead single was the introduction to Howling Bells' new sound.

Radio Wars was preceded by two singles "Into the Chaos" (November 2008), and "Cities Burning Down" (February 2009). None of the singles from the album charted in any country. The unofficial release of "Into the Chaos" was in October, where it was issued for free through the band's website. The song was originally an electronic track without melody or vocals that Juanita and Picchio had put together from other bits and pieces. The week of its official physical release, NME named it as their "track of the week". The single also appeared on a best-of-2009 playlist. The accompanying video was composed of in-and-out of studio footage while the band recorded the album. "Cities Burning Down", the oldest track from the album, was a song that Juanita and Moule created music for first, and the song's lyrics developed out of the instrumental's dark sound. The music video was directed by Piper Ferguson for Lodger Films and shot in December 2008 in London. In 2010, "Cities Burning Down", was one of over 100 tracks by various artists that appeared on the Realtime Worlds developed multiplayer online video game, APB: All Points Bulletin. "Digital Hearts" (May 2009) embodies the message of the album's title – the technological struggle in the new age. The lyrics for it were written by Juanita and Joel and influenced by Juanita and Moule's inability to tune in a tangible radio signal at their demoing location. A music video for the single was not released until three years after it was shot and produced. It was directed by Dan Lowe for Partizan and filmed in April 2009 in London.

== Artwork ==
Artwork for Radio Wars was by Mark James and photography by Clare Shilland. Howling Bells wanted a luminous front cover art that represented each individual to signify that the album was a brighter, colourful, more vibrant compendium, as well as a more collaborative songwriting effort with a greater input among the four members. By contrast the debut album's artwork has front and back covers that are grey-washed, appropriate to the gloomier, more languishing material mostly written by Juanita. In December 2011, Perez Hilton proclaimed on his website that Hot Chelle Rae copied the cover art of Radio Wars for its second album, Whatever. He concluded that both bands had copied Andy Warhol's paintings of the Shot Marilyns.

== Promotion, release and reception ==
Professional ratings
Aggregate scores
| Source | Rating |
|---|---|
| Metacritic | 67/100 |
Review scores
| Source | Rating |
| Allmusic | 3.5/5 stars |
| BBC | (unfavourable) |
| Clash | (favourable) |
| dBMagazine | (unfavourable) |
| Drowned in Sound | 6/10 stars |
| Gigwise | 2.5/5 stars |
| Pitchfork | 6/10 stars |
| SoundsXP | (unfavourable) |
| The Guardian | 3/5 stars |
| TORO | 3/5 stars |

After recording Radio Wars, Howling Bells returned to touring in July 2008. They incorporated new songs from the album into their live sets. The band performed at festivals over the next couple of months, including O_{2} Wireless, Latitude, and Lovebox Weekender. Howling Bells also supported The Duke Spirit and Mercury Rev. They headlined a string of shows in March 2009 supported by The Joy Formidable and Chew Lips. The group played at V Festival in Australia, before returning to the UK to support Razorlight. In May and June, they joined Pete Yorn as well as Snow Patrol, to support Coldplay for the third leg of the North American Viva la Vida Tour.

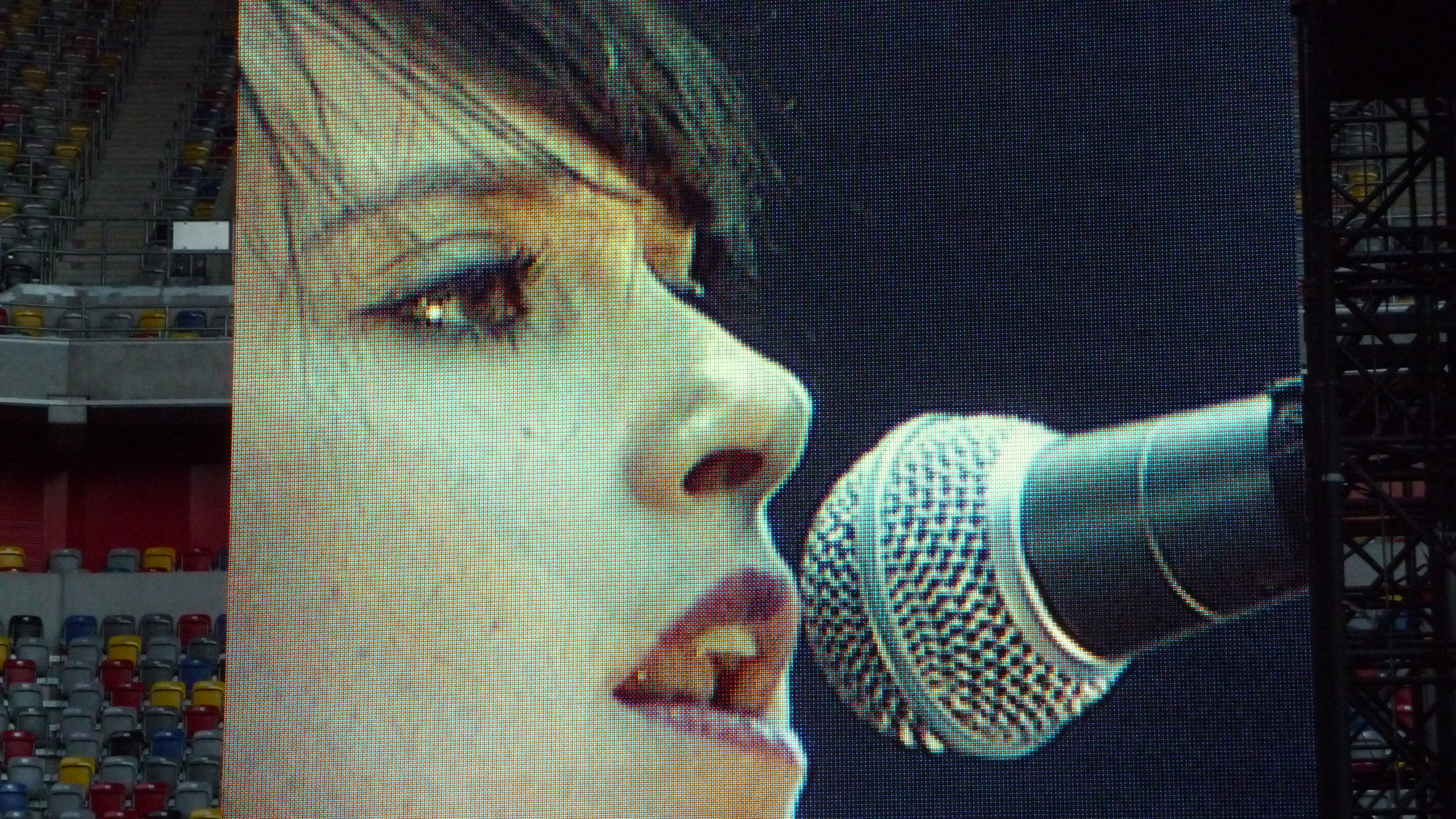
Juanita Stein, Esprit Arena, Düsseldorf, 2009

Radio Wars was released on 2 March 2009 in the UK, which was followed by release dates in several additional countries. A limited edition of the album was issued by both Independiente and Hostess, on the day of the release in their respective nations. It was presented as a digipak that included a bonus live disc containing seven tracks of a Howling Bells performance recorded at The Paradiso, in Amsterdam, in November 2008. (Note: Credits according to album notes.) The band played a free instore show at retail outlet Fopp Records, in Covent Garden, on the day of the UK release. Later that week they played another free show, this time sponsored by NME, at Punk in Soho. The event was broadcast live, and tickets were exclusive to winners of an online competition. The album spent four weeks on the Australian Albums Chart and peaked inside the Top 30. It made an appearance for three weeks on the UK Albums Chart and peaked just outside the Top 50. It did not chart in any other nation. The album was recognised on three different end-of-the-year lists.

Radio Wars was met with mixed reviews from those within the music industry. At Metacritic, which assigns a normalised rating out of 100 to reviews from mainstream critics, the album has received an average score of 67/100 based on 16 reviews. Album of the Year is a website that applies the same system of standardised scoring, this time using a fixed number of twelve mainstream publications as sources. Radio Wars obtained an average score of 60/100 based on five reviews for a final ranking of 268 out of 323 potential candidates for, "Album of the Year".

Positive reviews came from Andrew Leahey of Allmusic, who applauded the inclusion of string and brass instruments, and referred to the album as, "truthfully hard to resist." Estella Hung of PopMatters, praised the song, "Nightingale", for its ability to assemble itself out of nothing but Juanita's crooning. She declared: "Radio Wars is almost perfect to a fault." Camilla Pia of The Fly, applauded Grech-Marguerat's production, and expressed positive feelings towards the extra instrumentation. Lisa Wright of Subba Cultcha, commented: "Howling Bells still have a way with a melody pretty much unrivalled at the moment." She went on to say: "their second effort is a gorgeously, spine-tingling one honed to almost perfection." Greg Rose of Virgin Music, commended Howling Bells for their distinct songwriting, calling it, "both formidable and peculiar." He asserted: "They are possibly the best thing to come out of Australia since Nicole Kidman."

Less favourable reviews came from Darren Harvey of musicOMH, who called it: "unremarkable and disposable as a Domino's pizza box," and compared it to US college radio of the mid-1990s. He also added: "Lyrics that James Blunt would turn up his piggy little nose at [...] a mangling of the present participle that would make Conor Oberst choke on his granola." Andrew Winistorfer of Prefix Magazine: "a milquetoast selection of mid-tempo stadium anthems," though he found some positivity in "Golden Web", and claimed that the high point of the album was the soaring chorus of "Digital Hearts". He ended by retorting: "a featureless product that neglects the band’s distinct former character." Corban Goble of Adequacy, had good things to say about the instrumentation and commented that the record had a great feel, though he felt that the album was missing any kind of strong hook or melody, and that the band lacked passion.

== Track listing ==
All lyrics are written by Juanita Stein and Joel Stein, except where shown.

Main CD
| No. | Title | Writer(s) | Length |
|---|---|---|---|
| 1. | "Treasure Hunt" | | 2:45 |
| 2. | "Cities Burning Down" | Juanita Stein, Joel Stein, B. Picchio, G. Moule (Note: Songwriting credits for Glenn Moule adapted from ASCAP.) (Note: Songwriting credits for Brendan Picchio adapted from ASCAP.) | 4:13 |
| 3. | "It Ain't You" | Juanita Stein, Joel Stein, Peter Stein (Note: Songwriting credits for "It Ain't You" adapted from ASCAP.) | 3:17 |
| 4. | "Nightingale" | | 4:07 |
| 5. | "Let's Be Kids" | | 3:55 |
| 6. | "Ms. Bell's Song/Radio Wars Theme" | Juanita Stein, (Note: "Ms. Bell's Song" written by Juanita, with songwriting credits adapted from ASCAP.); Joel Stein (Note: "Radio Wars Theme" co-written by Juanita and Joel, with songwriting credits adapted from ASCAP.) | 5:27 |
| 7. | "Golden Web" | Juanita Stein, Joel Stein, B. Picchio | 3:23 |
| 8. | "Into the Chaos" | Juanita Stein, B. Picchio | 3:15 |
| 9. | "Digital Hearts" | | 3:36 |
| 10. | "How Long" | Joel Stein (Note: Songwriting credits for Joel Stein adapted from ASCAP.) | 3:25 |
| 11. | "To LA" (hidden track) | Juanita Stein (Note: Songwriting credits for Juanita Stein adapted from ASCAP.) | 3:01 |
| Total length: | | | 43:51 |

=== Paradiso EP ===
Bonus Live Disc
| No. | Title | Writer(s) | Length |
|---|---|---|---|
| 1. | "Setting Sun" | Juanita Stein, B. Picchio | 4:46 |
| 2. | "Wishing Stone" | | 3:54 |
| 3. | "Cities Burning Down" | Juanita Stein, Joel Stein, B. Picchio, G. Moule | 4:46 |
| 4. | "Treasure Hunt" | | 3:07 |
| 5. | "Nightingale" | | 4:25 |
| 6. | "Into the Chaos" | Juanita Stein, B. Picchio | 3:27 |
| 7. | "Radio Wars Theme" | | 3:22 |
| Total length: | | | 27:39 |

Recorded live at The Paradiso, Amsterdam, 22 November 2008.
EP comes with Limited edition digipak or otherwise as a download.

== Personnel ==
Howling Bells members

- Juanita Stein – vocals, rhythm guitar
- Joel Stein – lead guitar, keyboards
- Brendan Picchio – bass guitar, keyboards
- Glenn Moule – drums, keyboards

Production

- Dan Grech-Marguerat – producer
- Paul Grady – recording engineer
- Jason Mott – assistant recording engineer
- Cenzo Townshend – mixing engineer
- Neil Comber – assistant mixing engineer
- Nick Cervonaro – recording assistant

Additional musicians

- Sally Herbert – string & brass arrangement
- Simon Hayes – assistant string & brass arrangement
- Frances Dewar – violin
- Everton Nelson – violin
- Sonia Slany – violin
- Warren Zielinski – violin
- Bruce White – viola
- Ben Edwards – trumpet, flugelhorn
- Mike Kearsey – trombone
- Ian Burge – cello
Paradiso EP production
- Matt Lawrence – additional recording
- Dan Rejmer – additional recording assistant
- Kevin Vanbergen – mixing engineer
- John Davis – mastering engineer
- Olly Long – TM and live recording assistant
- Neil Iceton – Front of House (FoH)
- Adam Carr – stage technician
- Daniel Bentley – stage technician
- Patrick Boonstra – Paradiso sound engineer
- Erick de Bie – Paradiso monitor engineer

== Charts ==
| Chart (2009) | Peak position |
|---|---|
| Australian Albums Chart | 28 |
| UK Albums Chart | 55 |

== Accolades ==
| Country | Accolade (2009) | Provider | Ranking |
|---|---|---|---|
| France | Album of the Year | Stars Are Underground | 23 |
| UK | Album of the Year | The Fly | 29 |
| UK | Album of the Year | Piccadilly Records | 32 |

== Release history ==
| Region | Date (2009) | Label | Format | Catalogue No. |
|---|---|---|---|---|
| UK | 2 March | Independiente | 2xCD | ISOM76CDX |
| UK | 2 March | Independiente | CD | ISOM76CD |
| Australia | 6 March | Liberation | CD | LMCD0041 |
| Europe | 13 March | PIAS | CD | 9510076020 |
| Japan | 22 April | Hostess | 2xCD | HSE-30214 |
| N. America | 28 July | Nettwerk | CD | 067003086325 |
