= I'm Already Home =

Studio album by Waikiki
- Released: 29 September 2002
- Genre: Rock
- Label: Liberation Music

Singles from I'm Already Home
- 1. "New Technology" Released: 2002; 2. "Here Comes September" Released: 2002; 3. "Lucky" Released: 2002; 4. "Complicated" Released: 2003

I'm Already Home is the first studio album by the Australian rock band Waikiki, released on 29 September 2002. The album reached number 43 on the ARIA Albums Chart.

== Track listing ==
1. "New Technology"
2. "Lucky"
3. "Did I?"
4. "Falling"
5. "Ms Universe"
6. "Here Comes September"
7. "Complicated"
8. "Enough"
9. "A Drunken Laugh"
10. "Beautiful Picture"
11. "I'm Already Home"

== Charts ==
Chart performance for I'm Already Home
Chart (2002)	Peak position
Australian Albums (ARIA)	43
