= Zemestan-e 62 =

1987 novel by Esmail Fasih

- Author: Esmail Fasih
- Original title: زمستان ۶۲
- Language: Persian
- Subject: Iran–Iraq War
- Genre: War novel
- Publisher: Nashr-e No
- Publication date: 1987
- Publication place: Iran
- Pages: 464

Zemestan-e 62 (Persian: زمستان ۶۲, lit. 'Winter of '62') is a novel by the Iranian writer Esmail Fasih, first published in 1987 by Nashr-e No in Tehran. Its title refers to the winter of the Iranian year 1362 (1983–84), the third year of the Iran–Iraq War, and the story takes place almost entirely in Ahvaz and the war-torn regions of south-western Iran. The narrator is Jalal Arian, the familiar protagonist of most of Fasih's novels, who travels to Ahvaz in search of the young son of his former gardener, maimed in the war, and is accompanied on his journeys by Dr Mansur Farjam, a young engineer recently returned from the United States.

Rather than glorifying heroism on the battlefield, Zemestan-e 62 follows a group of displaced characters of different social classes and political convictions, each grappling with the death of loved ones or contemplating their own. The novel has been described as a type of war literature without precedent in modern Persian fiction, and Ehsan Yarshater praised it as an outstanding work of post-revolutionary fiction. It has been translated into German and Arabic. The film director Bahman Farmanara wrote a screenplay based on the novel, but was refused a permit to make the film.

== Background and publication ==
Until the outbreak of the war, Fasih was an assistant professor at the Abadan Institute of Technology (now part of the Petroleum University of Technology). He retired in 1980, when the siege of Abadan forced the institute to close. According to Fasih himself, what moved him to write Zemestan-e 62 was the loss of his life in Abadan, of the life of the city and of its children. Several of the novel's characters are based on the lives of his friends and of his students at the Abadan Institute of Technology.

According to Reza Jafari, the director of Nashr-e No, Fasih submitted a novel about Khuzestan during the war to the publishing house in the Iranian year 1365 (1986–87) and accepted the title Zemestan-e 62, which Jafari had proposed. He also agreed to a few minor changes suggested by the publisher, including the removal of a scene in which Jalal Arian's wife of convenience is killed in a bombing on the road to Tehran. Jafari added that the second printing of the book was denied distribution for years on the grounds that it "damaged national pride".

== Plot ==
In the winter of 1362, Jalal Arian makes three trips to Ahvaz. On the first, he and his chance companion, Dr Mansur Farjam, drive from Tehran to Ahvaz. Arian is searching for Edris Al-e Matrud, the war-maimed son of his former gardener, Matrud Al-e Matrud. Farjam, a thirty-year-old engineer, has returned from the United States after an absence of eleven years to set up a computer science centre for the National Iranian Oil Company, and to give himself a respite from the memory of his fiancée's tragic death.

The computer centre never gets off the ground. Instead, Farjam becomes increasingly intrigued by the willingness of ordinary people to sacrifice their lives in defence of their homeland. He meets Laleh Jahanshahi, who reminds him of his lost fiancée, and finds himself irresistibly drawn to her; she, however, is deeply in love with Farshad Kianzad, who is drafted for military service. Arian, who is teaching temporarily at the oil company's college, has to return to Tehran before he can find Edris.

On his second trip, Arian realises that Farjam's love for Laleh has grown stronger. With his project going nowhere, Farjam spends his nights staring at war footage on television, on top of which he has placed a single tulip (laleh in Persian) in a small crystal vase. While searching for Edris, Arian meets Maryam Jazayeri, a middle-aged widow whose husband was hanged in the early days of the Iranian Revolution and who is banned from leaving the country. Arian agrees to help her leave Iran and is eventually forced into a paper marriage with her so that she can obtain a passport. His search for Edris finally succeeds: the young man, who has lost an arm and a leg, has voluntarily returned to the front.

After a short trip to Tehran, Arian returns to Ahvaz for the third time. Laleh's mother dies of cancer, and her death, together with Farshad's posting to the battlefields of Majnoon Island, drives Laleh to the brink of suicide. Arian sends her with Maryam to Tehran, from where the two women are to fly to Europe. Meanwhile, Farjam's inner anguish grows, as do his love for Laleh and his identification with the ordinary people who are facing the war head-on.

The story reaches its climax when Farjam, who bears some resemblance to Farshad, exchanges his passport, his United States permanent residency card and his plane ticket for Farshad's uniform and military pass. Farshad joins Laleh and Maryam in Tehran, while Farjam goes to the front, where he is killed a few days later. As his body, burned beyond recognition, is buried as Farshad's, Arian looks at his watch, knowing that the hour marks the flight of Maryam Jazayeri, Laleh Jahanshahi, Farshad Kianzad and, ironically, "Mansur Farjam" to freedom. Shortly afterwards, Arian sets off from Ahvaz to Tehran with the maimed Edris.

== Characters ==
- Jalal Arian – the narrator; a retired lecturer at the oil company's college and Fasih's recurring protagonist, who narrates fifteen of his twenty-one novels.
- Dr Mansur Farjam – a thirty-year-old computer engineer who has returned from the United States.
- Edris Al-e Matrud – the young son of Arian's former gardener, an Iranian Arab, who has been maimed in the war.
- Maryam Jazayeri – a middle-aged widow, banned from leaving the country, whose husband was executed at the start of the revolution.
- Laleh Jahanshahi and Farshad Kianzad – a young couple in love; Farshad is drafted for military service.
- Dr Yar-Naser – a physician and old friend of Arian's in Ahvaz.

== Names and symbolism ==
Critics have pointed to the symbolic weight of the characters' names. The name Jalal Arian ("Aryan splendour") is widely seen as an ironic yet sympathetic allusion to the splendour of ancient Iranian culture and civilisation. Mansur Farjam's name, and his death in an operation on Majnoon Island – with its inherent pun on majnun ("madman") – recall his namesake, the mystic Mansur al-Hallaj, and his execution on the scaffold. Al-e Matrud means "clan of the outcasts", while laleh (tulip) is the symbolic flower of martyrdom in contemporary Persian literature.

== Themes ==
Zemestan-e 62 does not celebrate military heroism; instead, according to critics, it mourns the human condition in a world thrown into turmoil by war. Although it has several plot strands, the novel is ultimately about two young men, Edris and Farjam. Fasih's sympathies lie with those who stayed in Iran, or returned to it, and fought – an attitude embodied in the figure of Mansur Farjam. This stands in contrast to his unsympathetic portrayal, in Sorayya in a Coma, of Iranian expatriates living a life of self-pity in the cafés of Paris.

The novel's existential, sociological and autobiographical aspects have also been examined by critics. A sociological reading based on genetic structuralism describes it as a thoroughly social work, shaped by the outlook of an urban, middle-class, American-educated author who emphasises the negative consequences of the war. In this reading, the characters fall into two groups: those aligned with the government and those dissatisfied with the situation.

Throughout the story, Jalal Arian refers to Samuel Beckett's play Waiting for Godot and sees his own life, like those of its characters, as an endless wait filled with futile activity. The critic Abolfazl Najjari interprets this as a sign of Arian's fatalism and of his belief in the meaninglessness of life. In an interview with the newspaper Etemad in 2007, Fasih said: "In every story in which Jalal Arian appears, there is someone who suffers and struggles, but it all ends in death, and in the end he carries that person's body, as in Zemestan-e 62."

== Reception ==
Reviews of the novel have been mostly favourable, with dismissive comments, such as those of Bahauddin Khorramshahi, being rare exceptions. In his review of Fasih's literary career, Ehsan Yarshater praised Zemestan-e 62 as an outstanding work of post-revolutionary fiction. Together with Sorayya in a Coma, it is one of the two novels by Fasih that have received the widest and most serious critical attention.

Ali Dehbashi, editor of Bukhara, has called Zemestan-e 62 "one of the masterpieces of war literature", one that "shows the resistance of a nation against an all-out invasion".

== Proposed film adaptation ==
Speaking at a commemorative evening for Fasih organised by Bukhara magazine in July 2013, Bahman Farmanara said that his acquaintance with Fasih's work began with Zemestan-e 62, which he found "a deeply shocking experience". According to Farmanara, "the passion to make Zemestan-e 62" was one of his reasons for returning to Iran. He wrote screenplays based on Zemestan-e 62 and two other Fasih novels, Dastan-e Javid and Bade-ye Kohan, but all three applications for a filming permit were rejected "almost without any discussion, negotiation or even requests for changes".

== Translations ==
- German: Winter 83: Roman, translated by Mohammad H. Allafi and Sabine Allafi, Frankfurt, 1998.
- Arabic: Shitāʾ 84 (شتاء ٨٤), translated by Muhammad Ala al-Din Mansur, Cairo, 2000.
