= Pilar Zeta =

Argentine artist (born 1986)

- Zeta in 2026
- Born: Pilar Zeta; 1986 (age 39–40); Buenos Aires, Argentina
- Occupation: Artist
- Known for: Sculpture; public art
- Awards: Full list
- Website: pilarzeta.com

Pilar Zeta (born 1986) is an Argentine multidisciplinary artist working primarily in sculpture and site-specific public installation. Prior to her sculptural practice, she worked as an art director, receiving a nomination for Best Recording Package at the 63rd Annual Grammy Awards with Coldplay's Everyday Life (2019).

== Practice ==
Zeta's work draws on physics, perception and the architecture of ancient Egypt. Her sculptures and installations frequently use portals, thresholds, geometric structures and reflective surfaces to examine the relationship between the observer and its surroundings.

In 2023 she installed Mirror Gate at the foot of the Pyramids of Giza as part of Forever Is Now III, the contemporary art exhibition held at the site. She returned to Egyptian stone for Mirror Gate II (2026), installed on the Place du Louvre at the entrance to the museum’s Egyptian collections and aligned with I. M. Pei's Louvre Pyramid. The work combines yellow alabaster, Breccia Fawakhir and red Aswan granite from the quarry that supplied the statue of Ramesses II at the Grand Egyptian Museum. The granite is the same stone as the Luxor Obelisks in the Place de la Concorde, being installed 190 years after Egypt gave the obelisk to France.

The Observer Effect (2025), presented on Miami Beach in collaboration with Art Basel during Art Basel Miami Beach, takes its premise from the relationship between observation and outcome in quantum physics. Zeta practice also encompasses painting, including Liminal Laundry Room (2026).

== Publications ==
In 2026, Zeta appeared on the cover of King Kong (issue 21), in conversation with Marina Abramović, and on the annual art cover of L'Officiel Ibiza (issue 5), a magazine whose first issue featured a cover by Maurizio Cattelan. She also contributed a guide to the 61st Venice Biennale, published by Office.

== Selected works ==
- Mirror Gate (2023) – A monumental sculptural installation presented at the Pyramids of Giza in Egypt, part of the UNESCO World Heritage Site of Memphis and its Necropolis, during Forever Is Now III, organized by Art D'Égypte.
- The Observer Effect (2025) – A large-scale public art installation commissioned by Art Basel for Art Basel Miami Beach, comprising eight monumental portals exploring perception and spatial experience.
- Mirror Gate II (2026) – A monumental sculpture presented at Place du Louvre in Paris, establishing a visual dialogue with I. M. Pei's Louvre Pyramid.
- Telepathic Kiss Portal (2026) – A sculptural work exhibited at Perrotin Los Angeles as part of the group exhibition Summerlove Sensation.

== Awards ==
List of awards and nominations
Year (Note: Indicates the year of ceremony. Each year is linked to the article about the awards held that year whenever possible.)	Ceremony	Recipient	Category	Result	Ref.
2021	Grammy Awards	Everyday Life	Best Recording Package	Nominated	
2025	Clio Awards	Moon Music	Best Sustainable Design	Gold	

== Gallery ==
Mirror Gate (2025) at distance

The Observer Effect (2025) at distance

Mirror Gate II (2026) at distance

Telepathic Kiss Portal (2026) at distance

== See also ==
- List of Argentine Grammy Award winners and nominees
- List of Argentine women artists
