= List of Argentine Grammy Award winners and nominees =

The following is a list of Grammy Awards winners and nominees from Argentina:

Year	Category	Nominees(s)	Nominated for	Result
1962	Best Original Jazz Composition	Lalo Schifrin	Gillespiana	Nominated
1963	Best Original Jazz Composition	Lalo Schifrin	"Tunisian Fantasy"	Nominated
1965	Best Original Jazz Composition	Lalo Schifrin	"The Cat"	Won
1966	Best Original Jazz Composition	Lalo Schifrin	Jazz Suite on the Mass Texts	Won
1966	Best Original Score Written for a Motion Picture or Television Show	Lalo Schifrin	Theme from The Man From U.N.C.L.E.	Nominated
1967	Best Original Jazz Composition	Lalo Schifrin	"Marquis De Sade"	Nominated
1968	Best Instrumental Theme	Lalo Schifrin	Theme from Mission: Impossible	Won
1968	Best Original Score Written for a Motion Picture or Television Show	Lalo Schifrin	Music from Mission: Impossible	Won
1968	Best Instrumental Performance	Lalo Schifrin	Music from Mission: Impossible	Nominated
1969	Best Instrumental Theme	Lalo Schifrin	Theme from The Fox	Nominated
1969	Best Original Score Written for a Motion Picture or a Television Special	Lalo Schifrin	Theme from The Fox	Nominated
1970	Best Chamber Music Performance	Daniel Barenboim	Brahms: Sonatas In E Minor And F Major For Cello And Piano (Album)	Nominated
1971	Best Instrumental Arrangement	Lalo Schifrin	Theme from Medical Center	Nominated
1971	Best Instrumental Composition	Lalo Schifrin	Theme from Medical Center	Nominated
1974	Best Instrumental Composition	Gato Barbieri	Soundtrack from Last Tango in Paris	Won
1977	Classical Album Of The Year	Daniel Barenboim	Beethoven: The Five Piano Concertos	Won
1977	Best Classical Performance, Instrumental Soloist or Soloists (With Orchestra)	Daniel Barenboim	Beethoven: The Five Piano Concertos	Won
1977	Best Chamber Music Performance	Daniel Barenboim	Beethoven: Sonatas For Cello (Complete) (Album)	Nominated
1979	Best Chamber Music Performance	Martha Argerich	Bartók: Sonata For 2 Pianos And Percussion/ Mozart: Andante With 5 Variations For Piano, 4 Hands/ Debussy: En blanc et noir for 2 pianos	Nominated
1980	Best Choral Performance, Classical (OtherThan Opera)	Daniel Barenboim	Berlioz: La Damnation De Faust (Album)	Nominated
1980	Best Chamber Music Performance	Daniel Barenboim	Berg: Chamber Concerto For Piano And Violin/ Four Pieces For Clarinet And Piano (Album)	Nominated
1981	Best Chamber Music Performance	Daniel Barenboim	Messiaen: Quartet For The End Of Time (Album)	Nominated
1981	Best Instrumental Arrangement	Jorge Calandrelli	Forget The Woman	Nominated
1983	Best Classical Performance, Instrumental	Daniel Barenboim	Soloist (With Orchestra)Elgar: Violin Concerto In B Minor	Won
1984	Best Classical Vocal Soloist Performance	Daniel Barenboim	The Brahms Edition: Lieder (Complete) (Album)	Nominated
1984	Best Classical Vocal Performance	Daniel Barenboim	The Brahms Edition: Lieder (Complete)	Nominated
1985	Best Chamber Music Performance	Daniel Barenboim	Mozart: Violin Sonatas K.301,302,303,304 (Album)	Nominated
1986	Best Classical Album	Daniel Barenboim	Mozart: Violin And Piano Sonatas (K.296,305,306) (Album)	Nominated
1986	Best Choral Performance (Other Than Opera)	Daniel Barenboim	Mozart: Requiem (Album)	Nominated
1986	Best Chamber Music Performance	Daniel Barenboim	Tchaikovsky: Piano Trio In A Minor (Album)	Nominated
1987	Best Arrangement on an Instrumental	Jorge Calandrelli	Solfeggietto Metamorphosis (Track)	Nominated
1987	Best Arrangement on an Instrumental	Jorge Calandrelli	The First Letter (Track)	Nominated
1987	Best Instrumental Arrangement Accompanying Vocalist(s)	Jorge Calandrelli	Forget The Woman (Track)	Nominated
1988	Best Arrangement on an Instrumental	Jorge Calandrelli	Any Time, Any Season (Track)	Nominated
1989	Best Chamber Music Performance	Martha Argerich	Beethoven: Violin - Piano Sonatas No. 4 In A, Op. 23 And No. 5 In F, Op. 24 (Album)	Nominated
1991	Best Instrumental Arrangement Accompanying Vocalist(s)	Jorge Calandrelli	Body And Soul (Track)	Nominated
1991	Best Chamber Music Or Other Small Ensemble Performance	Daniel Barenboim	Brahms: The Three Violin Sonatas	Won
1992	Best Orchestral Performance	Daniel Barenboim	Corigliano: Symphony No. 1	Won
1992	Best Contemporary Composition	Daniel Barenboim	Corigliano: Symphony No. 1	Won
1992	Best Classical Album	Daniel Barenboim	Corigliano: Symphony No. 1 (Album)	Nominated
1992	Best Chamber Music Performance	Martha Argerich	Beethoven: Cello Sonatas, Nos. 1 And 2 (Album)	Nominated
1993	Best Instrumental Composition	Astor Piazzolla	Oblivion (Track)	Nominated
1994	Best Arrangement On An Instrumental	Lalo Schifrin	Dizzy Gillespie Fireworks (Track)	Nominated
1995	Best Chamber Music Performance	Daniel Barenboim	Beethoven: Cello Sonatas, Nos. 1 And 2 (Album)	Won
1995	Best Chamber Music Performance	Martha Argerich	Beethoven/Franck: Violin Sonatas (Album)	Nominated
1996	Best Instrumental Arrangement	Jorge Calandrelli	Atras Da Porta (Track)	Nominated
1996	Best Instrumental Arrangement	Jorge Calandrelli	Manha De Carnaval (Track)	Nominated
1997	Best Instrumental Composition	Jorge Calandrelli	The Fifth Season (Track)	Nominated
1997	Best Instrumental Arrangement	Jorge Calandrelli	Summer (Track)	Nominated
1997	Best Pop Instrumental Performance	Lalo Schifrin with the London Philharmonic Orchestra	"Theme from Mission: Impossible"	Nominated
1997	Best Instrumental Arrangement	Lalo Schifrin with the London Philharmonic Orchestra	Firebird: Jazz Meets the Symphony No. 3	Nominated
1998	Best Latin Rock, Urban or Alternative Album	Los Fabulosos Cadillacs	Fabulosos Calavera	Won
1999	Best Instrumental Composition	Astor Piazzolla	Tango Remembrances (Track)	Nominated
1999	Best Opera Recording	Jairo	Piazzolla: Maria De Buenos Aires (Album)	Nominated
1999	Best Classical Crossover Album	Jorge Calandrelli	Soul Of The Tango - The Music Of Astor Piazzolla	Won
1999	Best Instrumental Composition	Jorge Calandrelli	Tango Remembrances (Track)	Nominated
1999	Best Instrumental Composition Written for a Motion Picture or for Television	Lalo Schifrin	Soundtrack from Rush Hour	Nominated
1999	Best Latin Rock/Alternative Performance	Enanitos Verdes	Tracción Acústica	Nominated
2000	Best Latin Rock/Alternative Performance	Enanitos Verdes	Néctar	Nominated
2000	Best Latin Rock/Alternative Performance	Los Fabulosos Cadillacs	La Marcha Del Golazo Solitario	Nominated
2000	Best Instrumental Arrangement	Lalo Schifrin	Fiesta (Track)	Nominated
2000	Best Instrumental Arrangement	Jorge Calandrelli	Chelsea Bridge	Nominated
2000	Best Instrumental Arrangement Accompanying Vocalist(s)	Jorge Calandrelli	Day Dream (Track)	Nominated
2000	Best Instrumental Soloist(s) Performance (with Orchestra)	Martha Argerich	Prokofiev: Piano Concertos Nos. 1 & 3/Bartók: Piano Concerto No. 3	Won
2000	Best Chamber Music Performance	Martha Argerich	Soundtrack from Tchaikovsky/Shostakovich: Piano Trios (Album)	Nominated
2001	Best Instrumental Arrangement	Jorge Calandrelli	The Summer Knows/Estate (Track)	Nominated
2001	Best Instrumental Arrangement Accompanying Vocalist(s)	Jorge Calandrelli	Dream (Track)	Nominated
2001	Best Chamber Music Performance	Martha Argerich	Beethoven/Franck: Violin Sonatas (Album)	Nominated
2001	Best Orchestral Performance	Daniel Barenboim	Beethoven: The Symphonies (Album)	Nominated
2002	Best Instrumental Soloist(s) Performance(with Orchestra)	Daniel Barenboim	Strauss Wind Concertos - Horn Concerto; Oboe Concerto	Won
2002	Best Instrumental Arrangement	Lalo Schifrin	Scheherazade Fantasy	Nominated
2002	Best Song Written for a Motion Picture, Television or Other Visual Media	Jorge Calandrelli	A Love Before Time (From Crouching Tiger, Hidden Dragon)	Nominated
2003	Best Instrumental Arrangement Accompanying Vocalist(s)	Jorge Calandrelli	Esta Tarde Vi Llover	Nominated
2003	Best Opera Recording	Daniel Barenboim	Wagner: Tannhäuser	Won
2003	Best Orchestral Performance	Daniel Barenboim	Furtwängler: Symphony No. 2	Nominated
2003	Best Chamber Music Performance	Martha Argerich	Live In Japan (Chopin, Franck, Debussy)	Nominated
2003	Best Latin Pop Album	Diego Torres	Un Mundo Diferente	Nominated
2004	Best Latin Rock/Alternative Album	Gustavo Santaolalla	Cuatro Caminos	Won
2004	Best Classical Crossover Album	Jorge Calandrelli	Obrigado Brazil	Won
2004	Best Instrumental Arrangement	Jorge Calandrelli	Oblivion	Nominated
2004	Best Instrumental Arrangement Accompanying Vocalist(s)	Jorge Calandrelli	Chega De Saudade	Nominated
2005	Best Instrumental Arrangement	Jorge Calandrelli	Libertango	Nominated
2005	Best Chamber Music Performance	Martha Argerich	Prokofiev (Arr. Pletnev): Cinderella - Suite For Two Pianos/Ravel: Ma Mère L'Oye	Won
2005	Best Latin Pop Album	Diego Torres	Diego Torres: MTV Unplugged	Nominated
2006	Best Instrumental Soloist(s) Performance (with Orchestra)	Martha Argerich	Beethoven: Piano Cons. Nos. 2 & 3	Won
2006	Best Classical Album	Martha Argerich	Martha Argerich And Friends: Live From The Lugano Festival	Nominated
2006	Best Chamber Music Performance	Martha Argerich	Martha Argerich And Friends: Live From The Lugano Festival	Nominated
2006	Best Instrumental Arrangement Accompanying Vocalist(s)	Jorge Calandrelli	Time To Smile	Nominated
2006	Best Latin Pop Album	Kevin Johansen	Citi Zen	Nominated
2007	Best Instrumental Arrangement Accompanying Vocalist(s)	Jorge Calandrelli	For Once In My Life	Won
2007	Best Classical Album	Martha Argerich	Martha Argerich And Friends: Live From The Lugano Festival 2005	Nominated
2007	Best Chamber Music Performance	Martha Argerich	Martha Argerich And Friends: Live From The Lugano Festival 2005	Nominated
2007	Best Compilation Soundtrack Album for Motion Picture, Television or Other Visual Media	Gustavo Santaolalla	Brokeback Mountain	Nominated
2008	Best Compilation Soundtrack Album for Motion Picture, Television or Other Visual Media	Gustavo Santaolalla	Babel	Nominated
2008	Best Instrumental Arrangement Accompanying Vocalist(s)	Jorge Calandrelli	Cry Me A River	Nominated
2009	Best Latin Pop Album	Gustavo Santaolalla	La Vida...Es Un Ratico	Won
2010	Best Latin Rock, Alternative Or Urban Album	Los Fabulosos Cadillacs	La Luz Del Ritmo	Nominated
2010	Best Chamber Music Performance	Martha Argerich	Schumann/Bartók: The Berlin Recital	Nominated
2013	Best Instrumental Arrangement Accompanying Vocalist(s)	Jorge Calandrelli	Who Can I Turn To (When Nobody Needs Me)	Won
2014	Best Latin Pop Album	Ricardo Montaner	Viajero Frecuente	Nominated
2015	Best Latin Pop Album	Soledad Pastorutti	Raiz	Nominated
2016	Best Latin Pop Album	Diego Torres	Buena Vida	Nominated
2016	Best World Music Album	Osvaldo Golijov	Sing Me Home	Won
2018	Best Latin Jazz Album	Pablo Ziegler	Jazz Tango	Won
2018	Best Arrangement, Instruments and Vocals	Jorge Calandrelli	Every Time We Say Goodbye	Nominated
2018	Best Chamber Music/Small Ensemble Performance	Martha Argerich	Martha Argerich & Friends - Live From Lugano 2016	Nominated
2020	Best Latin Rock or Alternative Album	Fito Páez	La Conquista Del Espacio	Won
2021	Best Recording Package	Pilar Zeta	Everyday Life	Nominated
2025	Best Latin Rock or Alternative Album	Nathy Peluso	"Grasa"	Nominated
2027	Best Latin Song	Milo j	Niño	Pending
2027	Best Latin Rock Or Alternative Album	Milo j	La Vida Era Más Corta	Pending
2027	Best Latin Song	CA7RIEL & Paco Amoroso	"Hasta Jesús Tuvo un Mal Día"	Pending
2027	Best Latin Rock Or Alternative Album	CA7RIEL & Paco Amoroso	FREE SPIRITS	Pending
