= Bani Adam =

Poem by Persian poet Saadi Shirazi

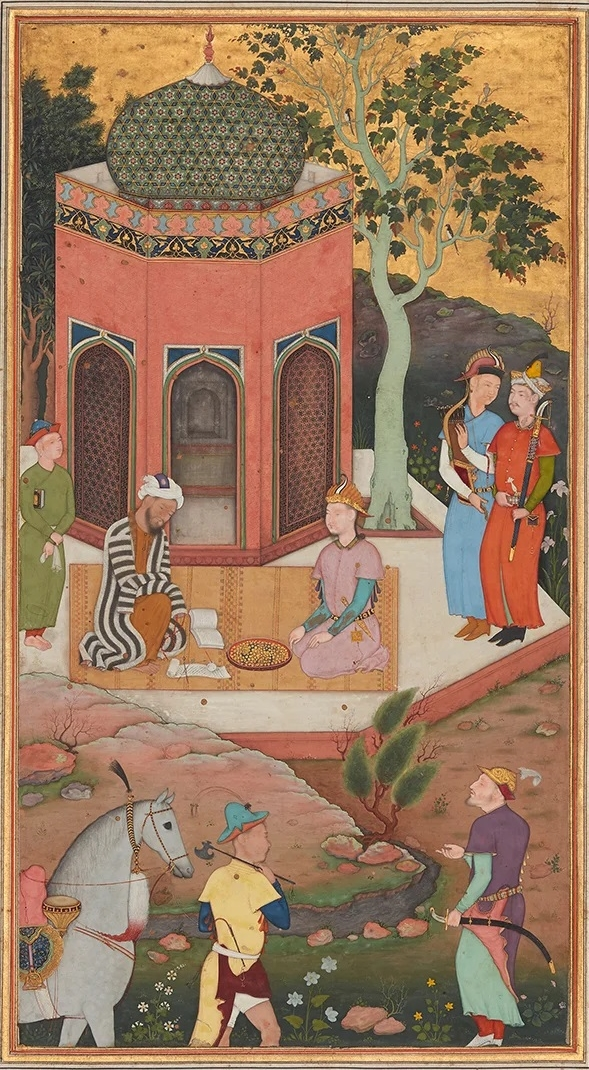
Folio depicting Saadi Shirazi (seated left) and the Salghurid ruler Abu Bakr ibn Sa'd (seated right). Made in Mughal India, dated 1602

Bani Adam (Persian: بنی‌آدم), meaning "Sons of Adam" or "Human Beings", is a 13th-century Persian poem by Iranian poet Saadi Shirazi from his Gulistan. The poem calls humans limbs of one body, all created equal, and when one limb is hurt, the whole body shall be in unease. It therefore concludes that one not touched by the pain of others cannot be called a human.

A translation of the first line of the poem was quoted by former U. S. President Barack Obama in a videotaped message to Iranians to mark Nowruz, the Persian New Year, on 20 March 2009. The poem is also inscribed on a large hand-made carpet installed in 2005 on the wall of a meeting room in the United Nations building in New York. A famous Iranian carpet trader had gifted the precious carpet, with Saadi’s poem sewn on it with golden thread, with the condition that it should be displayed somewhere appropriate.

In 2019, British rock band Coldplay featured the poem as spoken text in their song of the same name (listed as Persian: "بنی‌آدم"), as part of their 8th studio album, Everyday Life.

== Text ==
The poem comes from Saadi's book the Gulistan or Golestan (chapter 1, story 10), completed in AD 1258.

بنی آدم اعضای یک دیگر اند
که در آفرينش ز یک گوهرند
چو عضوى به‌درد آورَد روزگار
دگر عضوها را نمانَد قرار
تو کز محنت دیگران بی‌غمی
نشاید که نامت نهند آدمی

banī-ādam aʿzāy-e yek peikarand
keh dar āfarīnesh 'ze yek goharand
cho ʿozvī be-dard āvarad rūzgār
degar ʿozvhā rā namānad qarār
to k'az meḥnat-e dīgarān bī-ghamī
nashāyad keh nāmat nahand ādamī

A close translation of the above is as follows:

"Human Beings are members of a whole
In creation of one essence and soul
If one member is inflicted with pain
Other members uneasy will remain
If you have no sympathy for human pain
The name of human you can not pertain"

Or:

"Human beings are body parts of each other,
In creation they are indeed of one treasure.
If a body part is afflicted with pain,
Other body parts uneasy will remain.
If you have no sympathy for human pain,
The name of human you shall not retain."

Another poetic version by Dick Davis:

Man’s sons are parts of one reality
Since all have sprung from one identity;
If one part of a body’s hurt, the rest
Cannot remain unmoved and undistressed;
If you’re not touched by others’ pain, the name
Of “man” is one you cannot rightly claim.

Another version by Kalal Derhami reads:

"Children of Adam are all members of each other
In creation made of one earth, one mother
In time may a member find himself in pain
Other members stand besides him and remain
You who won't feel for others in despair and in pain
Shall not be worthy as a human and in name"

== Context of the poem ==
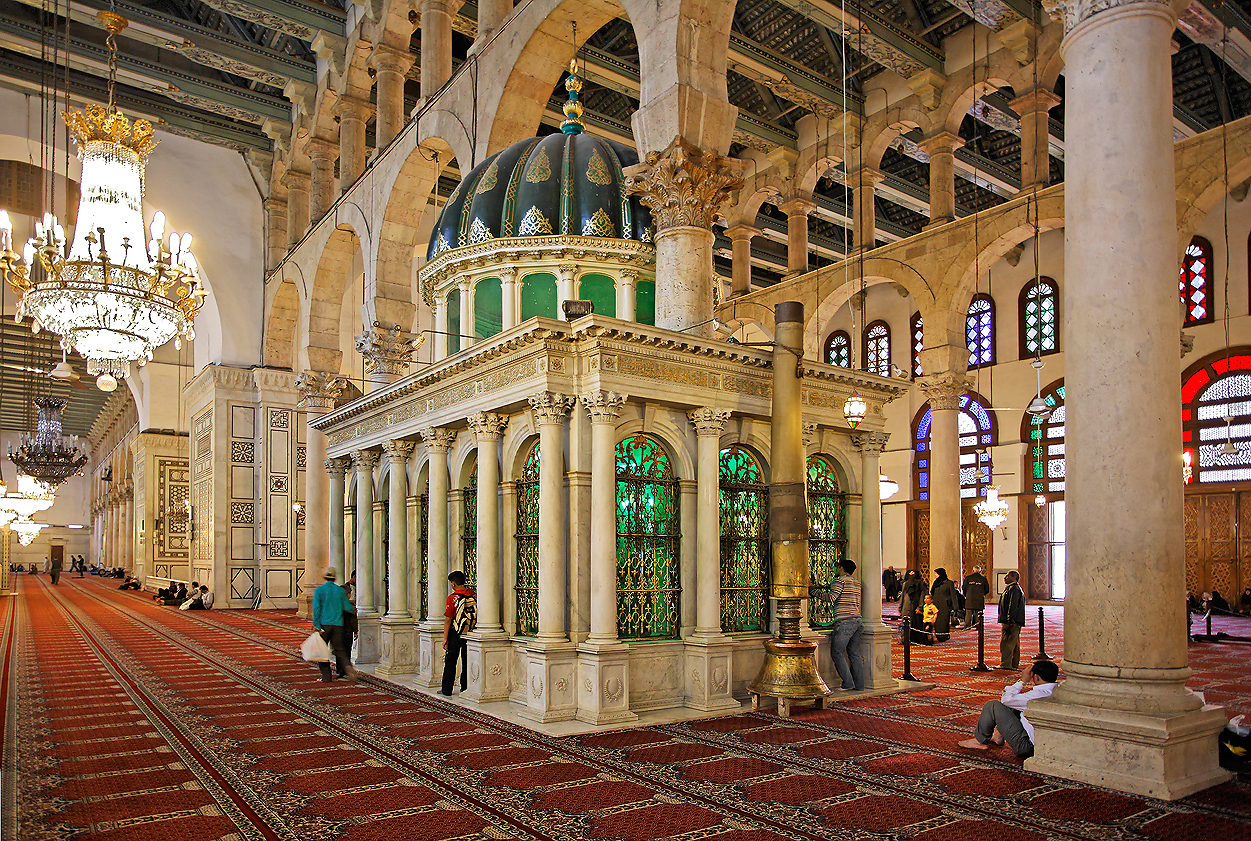
Shrine of John the Baptist in the Umayyad Mosque.

The poem comes in the Gulistan at the end of story ten of the first chapter "On the Conduct of Kings". In this story Saʿdi claims to have been praying at the tomb of John the Baptist in the Great Mosque in Damascus, when he gave advice to an unnamed king who requested Saʿdi to add his prayers to his own as he was afraid of a powerful enemy. Saʾdi's advice to the king was that if he wished to live a life free of fear of retribution he should rule his people with justice. He reinforces his advice with two short poems, the second of which is Bani Adam.

There seems no reason to doubt that Saʿdi may have visited Damascus in his travels, although this particular incident, like many of Saʾdi's stories, may of course be fictional.

The story is quoted below in the version completed in 1888 and published in 1928 under the name of Richard Francis Burton, but probably in fact by the Hungarian linguist Edward Rehatsek:

Story 10

I was constantly engaged in prayer, at the head of the prophet Yahia's tomb in the cathedral mosque of Damascus, when one of the kings, notorious for his injustice, happened to arrive on a pilgrimage to it, who offered his supplications and asked for compliance with his needs.

The dervish and the plutocrat are slaves on the floor of this threshold
And those who are the wealthiest are the most needy.

Then he said to me: 'Dervishes being zealous and veracious in their dealings, unite thy mind to mine, for I am apprehensive of a powerful enemy.' I replied: 'Have mercy upon thy feeble subjects that thou mayest not be injured by a strong foe.'

With a powerful arm and the strength of the wrist
To break the five fingers of a poor man is sin.
Let him be afraid who spares not the fallen
Because if he falls no one will take hold of his hand.
Whoever sows bad seed and expects good fruit
Has cudgelled his brains for nought and begotten vain imaginations.
Extract the cotton from thy ears and administer justice to thy people
And if thou failest to do so, there is a day of retribution.
–
The sons of Adam are limbs of each other
Having been created of one essence.
When the calamity of time afflicts one limb
The other limbs cannot remain at rest.
If thou hast no sympathy for the troubles of others
Thou art unworthy to be called by the name of a man.

== Variant readings ==
The first line of the poem is quoted in two different versions, one with yekdīgar "one another" and the other with yek peykar "one body". Both readings have their supporters.

=== In favour of yek dīgar ===
The variant of the poem containing the word yekdīgar "one another" is the form more usually quoted in Iran. It is the version found in the standard edition of the Gulistan edited by Mohammad Ali Foroughi, on the Internet on the Ganjoor Persian Literature website, and woven on the Persian carpet presented to the United Nations in New York in 2005. In 2010 the Central Bank of the Islamic Republic of Iran issued a 100,000-rial banknote containing the first couplet of the poem, also with the yekdīgar version. In a statement issued at the time in response to a controversy in the press about the choice of version, the bank said that they had chosen this version after consultation with experts at the Academy of Persian Language and Literature.

Among statements issued by experts at the time of the issue of the banknote, Professor Kavoos Hasanli of the University of Shiraz, the author of a book on Saadi, was quoted as saying that yek peykar is closer to the construction and grammar of Persian in Saadi's time and therefore more trustworthy. Later, however, in another statement he revised his view to say that although banī ādam a'zāye yek peykar-and is more grammatical and closer to the language of Saadi, he believed that since this version is not found in the early manuscripts, it is not the original one.

The yekdīgar variant is also favoured by Mohammad Jafar Yahaghi of the Academy of Persian Language and Literature, and was also supported by the late Professors Mojtaba Minovi and Gholamhossein Yousefi.

The version with yekdīgar is said to be found in all the early manuscripts, dating to within 60 years of the composition of the Gulistan. The scholar Habib Yaghmai wrote: "Twenty years ago when I was assisting the late Mohammad Ali Foroughi in preparing the 2nd edition of his collected works of Saadi, we had available some very old and reliable manuscripts, dating from 717 (1317-8 AD) and 724 (1324 AD) and later. In all these copies the poem appeared in the form banī ādam a'zāye yekdīgar-and."

=== In favour of yek paykar ===
However, despite the lack of manuscript support, other scholars have argued for the correctness of the variant yek peykar. Among these was Saeed Nafisi, himself the author of an edition of the Gulistan (1962), who pointed out that in the ta'liq style of handwriting used in Saadi's time, the expressions yekdīgar and yekpeykar would have looked almost identical. Another scholar who supported the reading yek peykar was the famous blind teacher Dr Mohammad Khazaeli, on the grounds that "members of one body" was not only more logical, but also closer to the hadith cited above, on which the poem is based.

It may be noted that although the carpet in the United Nations has the yekdīgar version woven into it, the English translation by Edward Eastwick on the plaque alongside it quoted in a speech by Ban Ki-moon (see below) "All human beings are members of one frame" translates the other version with yek peykar.

The word peykar has a wide range of meanings: "image", "figure", "effigy", "likeness", "statue", "icon", "body". Before Saadi's time it was most famously used by Nizami Ganjavi in his poem Haft Peykar ("The Seven Portraits") of 1197, the story of King Bahram, who finds portraits of seven princesses in a locked room. In other contexts, however, such as ghazal 595.6, where Saadi writes of his "feeble body" (peykar-e za'īf-am), the translation "body" is appropriate.

== Metre ==
The prose stories of the Gulistan are illustrated with short poems in a large variety of different metres. Three different metres are used in Story 10. The first couplet is in the 13-syllable ruba'i metre (3.3.13 and 5.1.13 in Elwell-Sutton's classification); the second poem, of four couplets, is in the 15-syllable metre known as mojtas (4.1.15), often used for lyric poetry.

The third poem, Bani Adam, is in the well-known 11-syllable motaqāreb (mutaqārib) metre (1.1.11), which is also used for Ferdowsi's Shahnameh and for Saadi's long poem the Bustan. The metre is usually used as here in the form of rhyming couplets.

The pattern of the metre is as follows (where "u" is a short syllable, and "–" a long one), reading from left to right:

u – – | u – – | u – – | u –

Monotony is avoided by variation in the position of the word accents, and by the occasional use of "overlong" syllables such as rūz and ozv- in the third and fourth lines, which are prolonged and occupy the time of a long plus a short syllable:

čo 'ozvī be dard āvarad rūzgār
degar 'ozvhā-rā na-mānad qarār

Thus these two lines have only 10 syllables instead of the usual 11.

== United Nations connection ==
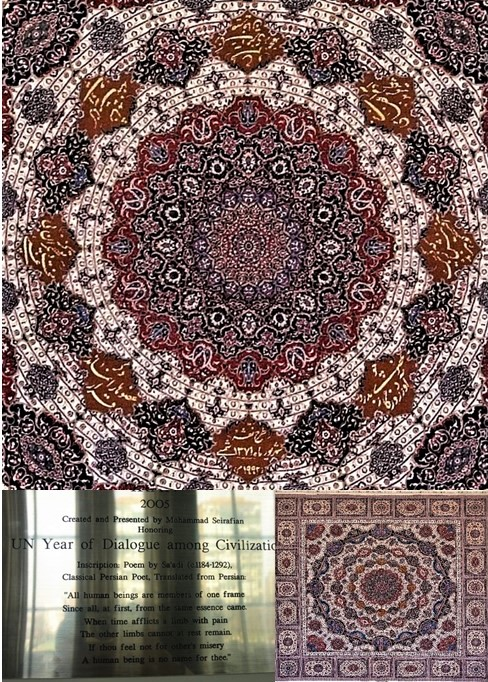
Persian carpet with the poem by Sa'adi, Bani Adam, in the United Nations-New York

The first Iranian representative to the League of Nations (the predecessor of the United Nations) from 1928 to 1930 was Mohammad Ali Foroughi, the editor of Saadi's works. In a speech made in Paris in 1929, Foroughi described how at a banquet of the League of Nations in Geneva in September 1928, an Albanian representative (who had apparently learnt Persian when Albania was still part of the Ottoman Empire) had made the suggestion that Saadi's poem would make a good motto for the organisation.

It seems that the suggestion was not taken up, but for many years it was rumoured in Iran that Saadi's poem had been inscribed over the entrance to the United Nations headquarters, either in New York or in Geneva. Later, Mohammad Javad Zarif, the Permanent Representative of Iran to the United Nations from 2002 to 2007, described how he searched both locations in vain, and could find no trace of any such inscription.

It was during Zarif's time, however, that Mohammad Seirafian, the owner of a famous carpet workshop in Isfahan, let it be known that he had a large 5 metre by 5 metre carpet containing Saadi's poem woven into it in gold letters, which he was willing to offer to the United Nations as a gift. This carpet was eventually installed in 2005 in a meeting hall in the interior of the United Nations headquarters in New York, where it shares a wall with a Chinese carpet. The eighth Secretary General of the United Nations, Ban Ki-moon, mentioned the carpet and quoted Saadi's poem in a speech made in Tehran in 2012 in these words:

"There is a magnificent carpet – I think the largest carpet the United Nations has – that adorns the wall of the United Nations, a gift from the people of Iran. Alongside it are the wonderful words of that great Persian poet, Sa’adi:

All human beings are members of one frame,
Since all, at first, from the same essence came.
When time afflicts a limb with pain
The other limbs at rest cannot remain.
If thou feel not for other’s misery
A human being is no name for thee."

The translation quoted by Ban Ki-moon, which is the same as that on the plaque on the wall of the United Nations commemorating the United Nations Year of Dialogue Among Civilizations (2001), is taken from the second edition (1880) of the translation of the Gulistan by Edward Eastwick.

The sentiment of Saadi's poem can be seen to conform to the spirit of the Universal Declaration of Human Rights, proclaimed by the United Nations General Assembly in Paris on 10 December 1948, of which the first article reads as follows:

"All human beings are born free and equal in dignity and rights. They are endowed with reason and conscience and should act towards one another in a spirit of brotherhood."

== Cultural references ==
Bani Adam was featured as spoken text in Coldplay's song of the same name (listed as Persian: "بنی‌آدم") on their 2019 album Everyday Life.
