= Le Trio Joubran =

Palestinian oud trio

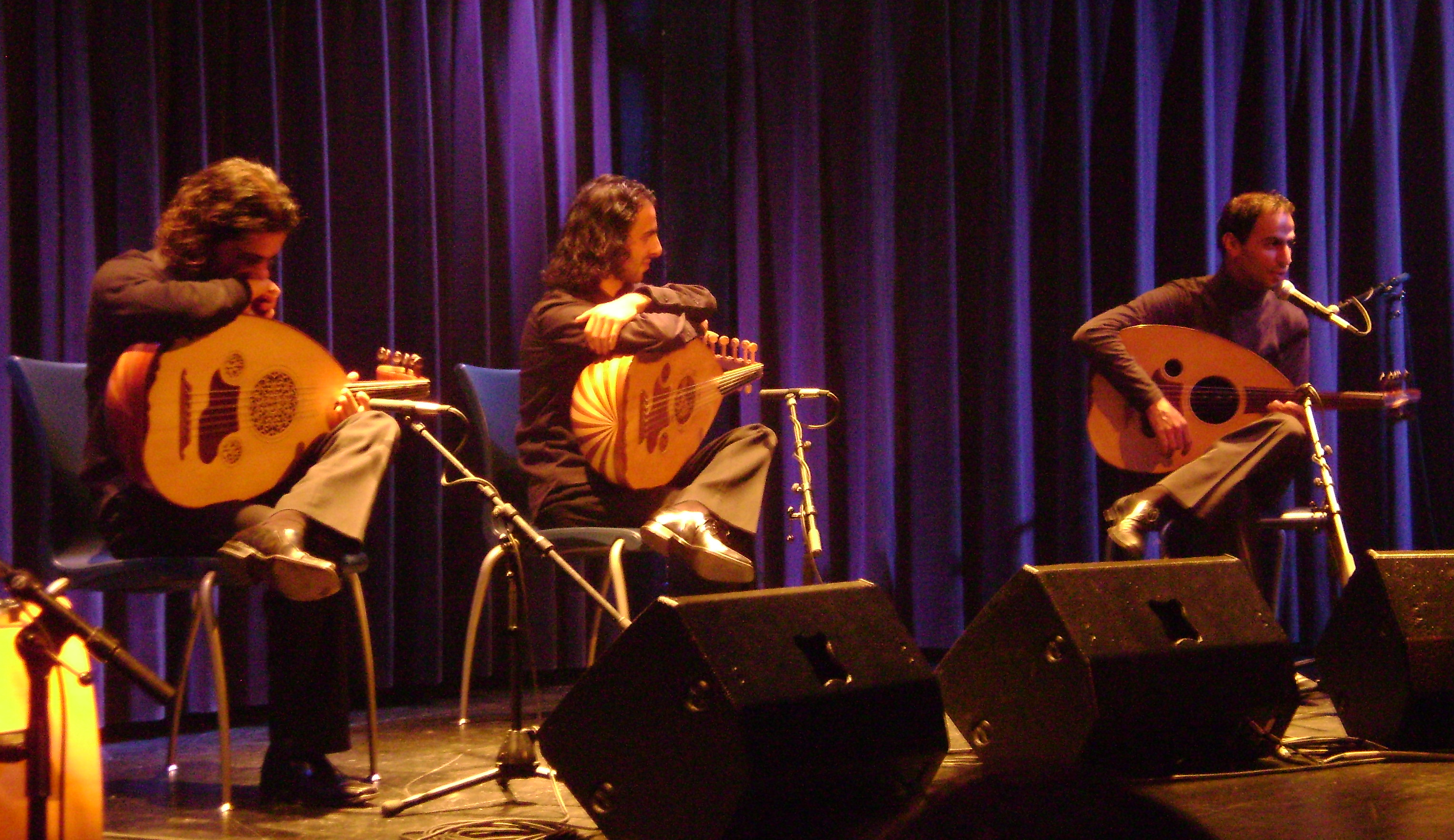
- Le Trio Joubran in 2008

Background information
- Origin: Nazareth, Israel
- Genres: Arabic music, jazz, oud
- Years active: 2004–present
- Label: Harmonia Mundi
- Members: Samir Joubran; Wissam Joubran; Adnan Joubran
- Website: www.letriojoubran.com

Le Trio Joubran (Arabic: الثلاثي جبران) is an oud trio playing traditional Palestinian music. The trio consists of brothers Samir, Wissam, and Adnan Joubran, originally from Nazareth and currently dividing their time between Nazareth, Ramallah and Paris. The Joubran brothers come from a well-known family with a rich artistic heritage. Their mother, Ibtisam Hanna Joubran, sang the Muwashahat (poems that originated in Arab Spain) while their father, Hatem, is among the most renowned stringed-instrument makers in Palestine and in the Arab world. They are the first oud trio.

== Formation ==
Samir Joubran, the eldest brother, began a successful music career in 1996, nearly a decade before the formation of the Joubran Trio. Samir released two acclaimed albums Taqaseem in 1996, followed by Sou'fahm in 2001. For his third album, Samir invited his younger brother, Wissam, to accompany him in duets. That album, Tamaas, was released in 2003. After returning from a tour, Samir proposed forming a trio with his youngest brother Adnan. In August 2004, in the Luxembourg Gardens in Paris, Le Trio Joubran came to life.

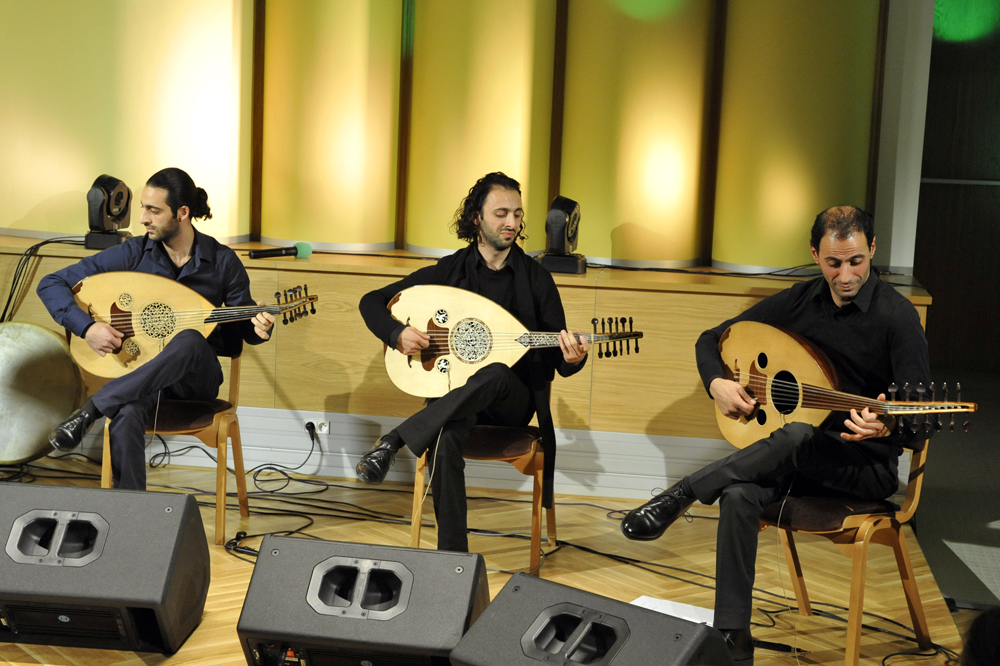
Palestinian Trio Joubran - brothers playing oud in concert at the Polish Radio studio in Warsaw, Poland - February 2013

== Awards ==
In 2009, Arab Muhr award, Dubai International Film Festival

- Best soundtrack for Adieu Gary, directed by Nassim Amaouche

In 2011, "Arab Muhr" award, Dubai International Film Festival

- Best soundtrack for The Last Friday, directed by Yahya Al Abdallah

In 2013, The Order of Merit and Excellence from Palestinian President Mahmoud Abbas.

In 2013, International Award of Palestine

== Collaborations ==
In 2019, Le Trio Joubran collaborated with British rock band Coldplay for the song "Arabesque". It was released as a single from their eighth album Everyday Life, which drew influence from Arabic music.

== Discography ==
- Tamaas (2002)
- Randana (2005)
- Majâz (2007)
- À l'ombre des mots (2008)
- Le Dernier VoL, with Chkrrr (2009)
- AsFâr, featuring Dhafer Youssef (2011)
- The First Ten Years (2013) Series of 5 CDs and 1 DVD
- The Long March (2018)
