= Orphans (Coldplay song) =

2019 single by Coldplay

- Dual single cover

Single by Coldplay

from the album Everyday Life
- Released: 24 October 2019
- Genre: Pop rock
- Length: 3:17
- Label: Parlophone; Atlantic
- Songwriters: Guy Berryman; Jonny Buckland; Will Champion; Chris Martin; Moses Martin
- Producers: Rik Simpson; Dan Green; Bill Rahko

Coldplay singles chronology
"Something Just Like This" (2017)	"Orphans" / "Arabesque" (2019)	"Higher Power" (2021)

Music video
- "Orphans" on YouTube

"Orphans" is a song by British rock band Coldplay from their eighth studio album Everyday Life. It was released on 24 October 2019, along with the single "Arabesque" and appears on the second side of the album Sunset. The song was written by the band members and produced by The Dream Team.

== Background and promotion ==
On 24 October 2019, the band announced the release (on the same day) of the songs "Arabesque" and "Orphans" as a dual release and as the first singles of Everyday Life. About the content of the songs, lead singer Chris Martin said in an interview with BBC Radio 1 that "some of it’s very personal, about real things in my life, and some of it’s about things that I see or we see, and some of it’s about trying to empathise about what other people are going through". On the day of the release, the band set up a timer counting down to the release of the songs.

The subject matter of the song includes the plight of refugees of the Syrian civil war. Martin told the BBC, “It seems to me that one of the things that might help people have a better time is to put themselves in other people’s shoes, whether that’s these kids who have to leave Syria, or who grew up in Baltimore, or whatever it might be. Rather than judging from afar, maybe to think ‘I wonder what it’s like to be there.'” Coldplay donated 10% of the worldwide proceeds from the song to the refugee charity Hopeland.

== Recording ==
The song was recorded last-minute during the mixing of the album Everyday Life, for which it served as one of two lead singles.

== Music video ==
The song's music video, directed by Mat Whitecross, premiered on 25 October 2019. The music video shows the development of the song from its earliest roots, a voice memo by Chris Martin in which the singer is heard talking about the tuning of his guitar before playing what would become the song's main riff, to the fully polished song that was released. The music video won an award at the 2020 MTV VMAs for 'Best Rock' music video.

== Reception ==
3voor12 (61), Billboard (93), NME (41) and Radio X (unranked) included the track on their "Best Songs of 2019" lists.

== Live performances ==
The song was performed live for the first time during NBC's Saturday Night Live on 2 November 2019. In a rehearsal, Martin explained to the dancers who accompanied the band's performance, "This song is about, you see all these pictures of young people like you and a bit older people like us, having to leave their countries and everyone calls them refugees or migrants rather than just people. So we were thinking about, this could be any of us who is in these camps or at the border or whatever. And that's what this song’s about, it's like people like us saying, 'I just want to go home and be normal.'" "Orphans" was later played live on the Annie Mac Show on BBC Radio 1 on 27 November 2019 along with "Arabesque", "Everyday Life", "Lovers in Japan", and "Guns".

== Personnel ==
Credits adapted from the "Orphans / Arabesque" liner notes.

- Recording
- Coldplay
- Guy Berryman – bass guitar
- Will Champion – drums, percussion, backing vocals
- Jonny Buckland – guitar
- Chris Martin – guitar, vocals

Additional musicians

- Aluna – choir vocal
- Garine Antreassian – choir vocal
- Jocelyn 'Jozzy' Donald – choir vocal
- Nadeen Fanous – choir vocal
- Marwa Kreitem – choir vocal
- Apple Martin – choir vocal
- Max Martin – keyboards
- Moses Martin – choir and backing vocal
- Bashar Murad – choir vocal
- Ben Oerlemans – choir vocal
- Bill Rahko – choir vocal
- Norah Shaqur – choir vocal
- Rik Simpson – keyboards
- Production
- Main
- Daniel Green – producer
- Emily Lazar – mastering
- Max Martin – producer, programming
- Bill Rahko – producer
- Rik Simpson – producer

Assistants

- Erwan Abbas – assistant engineering
- Chris Allgood – assistant mastering
- Matt Glasbey – assistant engineering
- Pierre Houle – additional engineering
- Matt Latham – assistant engineering
- Baptiste Leroy – assistant engineering
- Bastien Lozier – additional engineering
- Issam Murad – assistant engineering
- Anthony De Souza – assistant engineering
- Federico Vindver – additional engineering

== Charts ==
=== Weekly charts ===
Weekly chart performance
Chart (2019–2020)	Peak position
Argentina (Argentina Hot 100)	62
Australia (ARIA)	71
Belgium (Ultratop 50 Flanders)	9
Belgium (Ultratop 50 Wallonia)	7
Bolivia (Monitor Latino)	14
Canada Hot 100 (Billboard)	59
Canada AC (Billboard)	33
Canada Hot AC (Billboard)	47
Canada Rock (Billboard)	27
Croatia International Airplay (Top lista)	4
Czech Republic Airplay (ČNS IFPI)	27
Czech Republic Singles Digital (ČNS IFPI)	56
Estonia (Eesti Ekspress)	31
France (SNEP)	172
Germany (GfK)	94
Hungary (Rádiós Top 40)	20
Hungary (Single Top 40)	37
Ireland (IRMA)	31
Israel International Airplay (Media Forest)	4
Italy (FIMI)	55
Italy Airplay (EarOne)	1
Japan (Japan Hot 100)	87
Latvia (LaIPA)	23
Lebanon (Lebanese Top 20)	7
Lithuania (AGATA)	28
Mexico Airplay (Billboard)	24
Mexico Ingles Airplay (Billboard)	1
Netherlands (Dutch Top 40)	15
Netherlands (Single Top 100)	37
New Zealand Hot Singles (RMNZ)	10
Norway (VG-lista)	33
Poland Airplay (ZPAV)	20
Portugal (AFP)	65
San Marino (SMRRTV Top 50)	5
Scottish Singles Sales (Official Charts)	13
Slovakia Airplay (ČNS IFPI)	91
Slovakia Singles Digital (ČNS IFPI)	45
Slovenia (SloTop50)	25
South Korea BGM (Gaon)	165
Spain (PROMUSICAE)	88
Sweden (Sverigetopplistan)	37
Switzerland (Schweizer Hitparade)	25
UK Singles (Official Charts)	27
US Bubbling Under Hot 100 (Billboard)	6
US Adult Pop Airplay (Billboard)	28
US Hot Rock & Alternative Songs (Billboard)	3
US Rock & Alternative Airplay (Billboard)	1

=== Monthly charts ===
Monthly chart performance
Chart (2019)	Peak position
Latvia Airplay (LaIPA)	4

=== Year-end charts ===
Year-end chart performance
Chart (2019)	Position
Italy Airplay (EarOne)	65
Netherlands (Dutch Top 40)	88
Tokyo (Tokio Hot 100)	15
UK Vinyl Singles (OCC)	29
US Hot Rock & Alternative Songs (Billboard)	98

Chart (2020)	Position
Belgium (Ultratop Wallonia)	82
Hungary (Rádiós Top 40)	99
US Rock Airplay (Billboard)	7
US Hot Rock & Alternative Songs (Billboard)	27

== Certifications ==
Certifications
Region	Certification	Certified units/sales
Australia (ARIA)	Platinum	70,000^{‡}
Brazil (Pro-Música Brasil)	Gold	20,000^{‡}
France (SNEP)	Gold	100,000^{‡}
Italy (FIMI)	Gold	35,000^{‡}
New Zealand (RMNZ)	Gold	15,000^{‡}
Spain (Promusicae)	Gold	30,000^{‡}
United Kingdom (BPI)	Gold	400,000^{‡}
^{‡} Sales+streaming figures based on certification alone.

== Release history ==
Release dates and formats
Region	Date	Format	Label	Ref.
Various	24 October 2019	Digital download · streaming	Parlophone	
Australia	25 October 2019	Contemporary hit radio	Warner · Parlophone	
Italy	25 October 2019	Contemporary hit radio	Warner	
United Kingdom	25 October 2019	Contemporary hit radio	Parlophone	
United Kingdom	2 November 2019	Adult contemporary	Parlophone	

== See also ==
- List of Billboard number-one adult alternative singles of the 2020s
