= Arabesque (Coldplay song) =

2019 song by Coldplay

- Dual single cover

Single by Coldplay

from the album Everyday Life
- Language: English; French
- Released: 24 October 2019
- Genre: Art rock; nu jazz
- Length: 5:40
- Label: Parlophone; Atlantic
- Songwriters: Guy Berryman; Jonny Buckland; Will Champion; Chris Martin; Drew Goddard; Femi Kuti; Paul Van Haver
- Producers: Bill Rahko; Daniel Green; Rik Simpson

Coldplay singles chronology
| "Something Just Like This" (2017) | "Arabesque" / "Orphans" (2019) | "Higher Power" (2021) |

Lyric video
- "Arabesque" on YouTube

"Arabesque" is a song by British rock band Coldplay from their eighth studio album Everyday Life. It was released on 24 October 2019, along with the single "Orphans", and appears on the first side of the album Sunrise. The song features vocals by Belgian singer Stromae, horn sections by Nigerian musician Femi Kuti, and oud contributions from Palestinian group Le Trio Joubran.

The song was written by all Coldplay members, Karnivool guitarist Drew Goddard, Kuti and Stromae, while production was handled by the Dream Team. It is the second release by the band to feature profanity, with Martin singing the lyric "same fucking blood" during the final verses. Their first release to feature profanity overall was the remix of "Lost!", featuring Jay-Z.

== Background and promotion ==
On 24 October 2019, the band announced the dual release of the songs "Arabesque" and "Orphans" as the first singles from their album Everyday Life, with both tracks being released on the same day. In anticipation of the new era, the band set up a countdown leading up to the release a few hours in advance. "Arabesque" was performed live on BBC Radio 1's Annie Mac Show on 27 November 2019.

== Critical reception ==
"Arabesque" received widespread critical acclaim. Dan Stubbs of NME noted that the song "finds Coldplay in less familiar territory than 'Orphans', featuring French vocals and a saxophone freakout that shifts the song into a modern jazz piece perfectly in tune with the nu-jazz zeitgeist. Writing for Under the Radar, Christopher Roberts named "Arabesque" the best song of the week, stating that it is "one of the most interesting songs the band has released in years".

Christian Eede of The Quietus wrote that "Coldplay are digging up their roots and toying with the base-level fabric of their sound with an attacking, seductive piece that storms trumpet-first", naming the song among the best of October 2019. 3voor12, Herald Sun, and Muzikalia have all added "Arabesque" to their lists of best releases of the year as well.

== Live performances ==
Coldplay performed the song alongside Femi Kuti several times during the promotion campaign for Everyday Life, including at the Hollywood Palladium, and the Natural History Museum of London. In 2024, the band invited Kuti and Palestinian-Chilean singer Elyanna to Glastonbury Festival, which was part of the Music of the Spheres World Tour.

== Personnel ==
Credits adapted from the "Orphans / Arabesque" liner notes.

Coldplay

- Guy Berryman – bass guitar, hand clap, writer
- Will Champion – drums, keyboards, percussion, vocals, writer
- Jonny Buckland – guitar, writer
- Chris Martin – guitar, hand clap, vocals, writer

Additional musicians

- Omorinmade Anikulapo-Kuti – alto saxophone
- Babatunde Ankra – trombone
- Drew Goddard – guitar, writer
- Daniel Green – keyboards
- Samir Joubran – guitar
- Wissam Joubran – guitar
- Adnan Joubran – guitar
- Femi Kuti – horn, writer
- Made Kuti – orchestrionics
- Ayoola Magbagbeola – tenor saxophone
- Gbenga Ogundeji – trumpet
- Bill Rahko – keyboards
- Davide Rossi – strings
- Rik Simpson – keyboards
- Stromae – vocals, writer

Production

- Chris Allgood – assistant mastering
- Lionel Capouillez – additional engineer
- Michael Freeman – mixing
- Daniel Green – producer, programmer
- Adnan Joubran – additional engineer
- Emily Lazar – mastering
- Bill Rahko – producer, programmer
- Lance Robinson – additional engineer
- Davide Rossi – additional engineer
- Jacques Du Plessis - additional engineer
- Gavin Flax - additional engineer
- Rik Simpson – producer, programmer
- Mark "Spike" Stent – mixing
- Matt Wolach – assistant mixing

== Charts ==
Weekly chart performance
| Chart (2019) | Peak position |
|---|---|
| Belgium (Ultratip Bubbling Under Flanders) | 8 |
| Belgium (Ultratip Bubbling Under Wallonia) | 20 |
| UK Singles Sales (Official Charts) | 76 |
| US Hot Rock & Alternative Songs (Billboard) | 29 |

== Release history ==
Release dates and formats
| Region | Date | Format | Label | Ref. |
|---|---|---|---|---|
| Various | 24 October 2019 | Digital download · streaming | Parlophone | |
| United Kingdom | 25 October 2019 | Contemporary hit radio | Parlophone | |
