= Salam Toronto =

Persian-English bilingual weekly publication

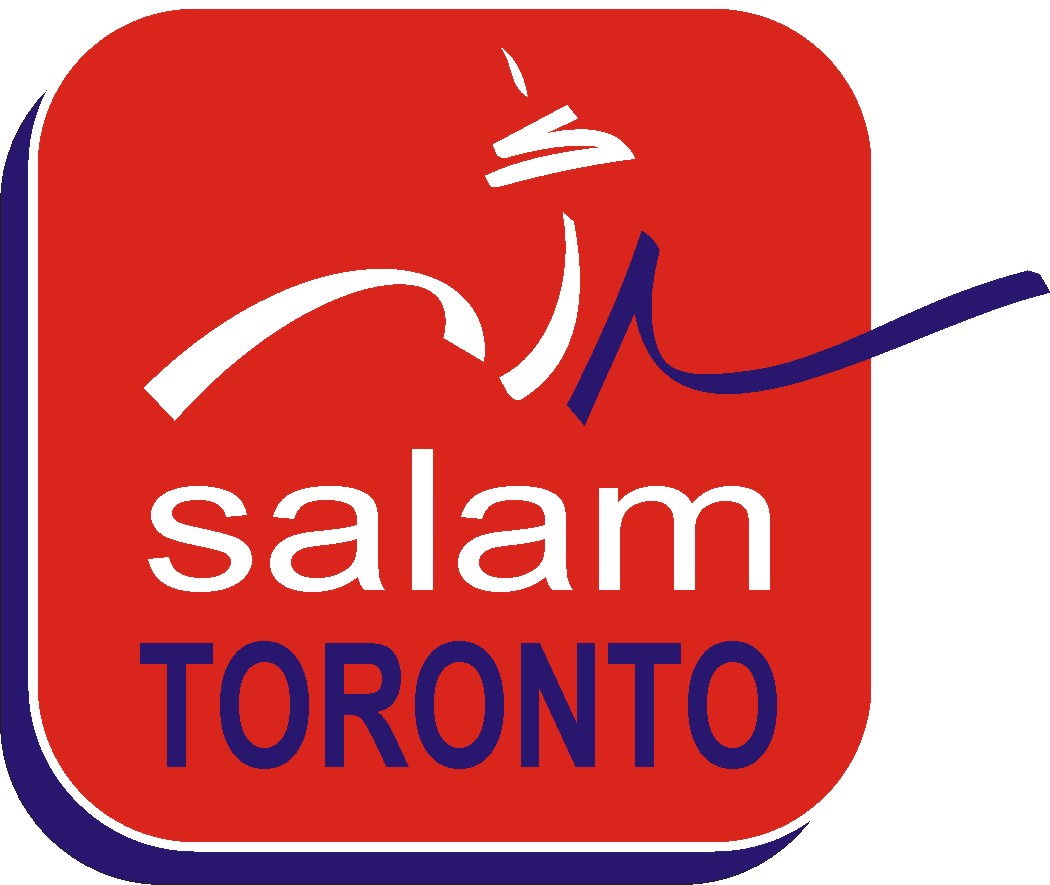
- Salam Toronto
- Type: Weekly newspaper Published on Thursdays
- Publisher: Salam Toronto Media Inc.
- Editor: Mohsen Taghavi
- Founded: 2000
- Headquarters: 7398 Yonge Street; Thornhill, Ontario; L4J 8J2
- Website: www.salamtoronto.ca

Salam Toronto (Persian: سلام تورنتو) is the first Persian-English bilingual weekly publications in Canada being published since October 2000.

In publication since October 2000, Salam Toronto earned the distinction of being the first and only ethnic publication to be elected as a board member of Ontario Community Newspapers Association (OCNA). With an immediate online edition available every Thursday, Salam Toronto can be read from all over the world.

Salam Toronto's readership has grown, and extends its reach as far east as Ottawa and as far west as Windsor.

It focuses on issues pertaining to those living in southern Ontario specifically, and encourages its readership to fully participate in Canadian society and not only add to it, but also learn from it. Its "What's Up" section keeps readers up to date with events around the city, and its exclusive interviews with community leaders, politicians, and dignitaries brings the reader news.

== Achievements and awards ==
In June 2002, in a ceremony attended by Foreign Affair Minister Bill Graham, Mohsen received the Canadian Ethnic Journalists' and Writers' Club Award for its editorial Thank you Toronto encouraging the city's continued participation in Olympic bidding.

On May 22, 2008, York Regional Police named Salam Toronto's feature story on Community-Police relations by Sallya Aleboyeh as its "Best Feature story of the Year - in Print". The story emphasized the need for Iranian Canadians to develop open lines of communication with Officers and to report any instances of injustice.

In October 2009, Salam Toronto, in collaboration with Bukhara magazine, invited Bukhara's Editor-in-Chief, Ali Dehbashi to Toronto to deliver a series of lectures at the Universities of Toronto, Carlton and Queen's. Bukhara is a Persian language magazine printed in Tehran, Iran whose aim is to publish scholarly articles about Persian history, art, culture, philosophy and literature.

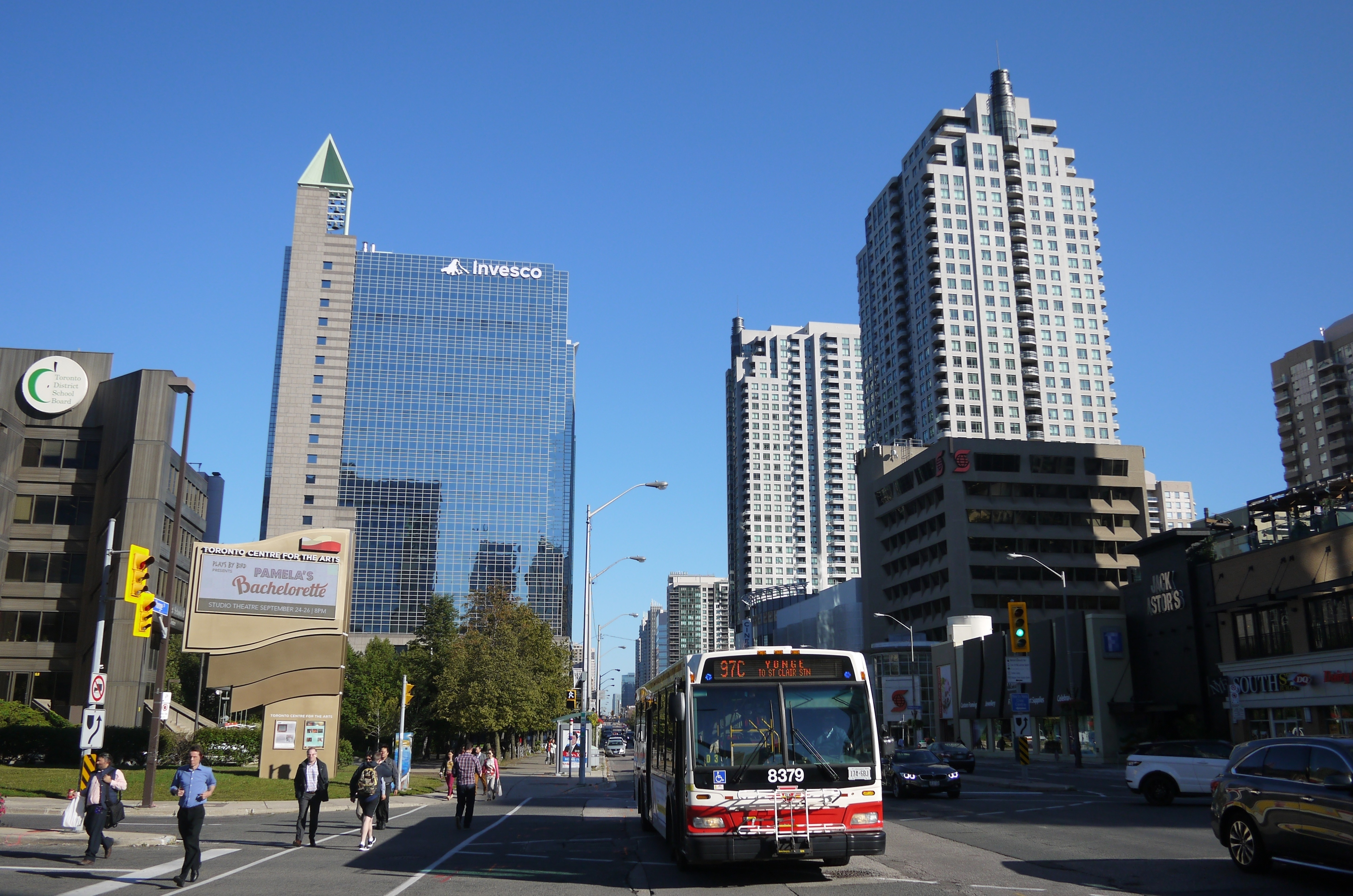
North York - In many of Toronto's neighborhoods, Persian is among the top 5 ethnic languages spoken. In the North York neighborhoods, it is among the top 3.

== Demographics ==
Since the 1990s, Iranians have been among the top immigrant populations in Canada.

The number of Iranians living in Richmond Hill for instance has more than doubled since 2001 and Persian is now the third most spoken language in Richmond Hill, behind English and Chinese. Persian makes up for 7% of the mother tongue languages spoken in Richmond Hill.

== Editor in Chief ==
Editor-in-Chief Mohsen Taghavi worked as an editor with major dailies in Iran before migrating to Canada.

== Columnists ==
- Maxiar Mirhosseini

== Distribution ==
In addition to subscriptions, and online editions, Salam Toronto is distributed to more than 150 locations in the GTA in hard copies and on a weekly basis. These locations include offices, restaurants, super markets, pharmacies etc.
