= Everyday Life (Coldplay album) =

2019 studio album by Coldplay

- Standard edition cover

Studio album by Coldplay
- Released: 22 November 2019
- Recorded: December 2017 – 2019
- Studios: The Bakery (London); The Beehive (London); AIR (London); Villa Tombolino (Tuscany); Ampney Crucis (Cotswolds); The Woodshed (Los Angeles); Petra Manor (Malibu); New York City; Paris; Johannesburg; Buenos Aires
- Length: 53:36
- Languages: English; Arabic; French; Igbo; Persian; Spanish; Xhosa
- Labels: Parlophone; Atlantic
- Producers: Rik Simpson; Dan Green; Bill Rahko; John Metcalfe; Davide Rossi

Coldplay chronology
Live in Buenos Aires (2018)	Everyday Life (2019)	Music of the Spheres (2021)

Singles from Everyday Life
- 1. "Orphans" / "Arabesque" Released: 24 October 2019

Everyday Life (Arabic: الحياة اليومية, romanized: al-Ḥayāt al-Yawmiyya) is the eighth studio album by British rock band Coldplay. It was released on 22 November 2019 by Parlophone in the United Kingdom and Atlantic in the United States. It is a double album released as a single CD, with the first half titled Sunrise and the other Sunset. The release coincided with Coldplay: Everyday Life – Live in Jordan, in which performances of each half of the album were broadcast from the Amman Citadel in Jordan. Many returning producers and collaborators joined the efforts including Rik Simpson, Dan Green, Bill Rahko, Davide Rossi, and Emily Lazar.

Speculation about the album's existence persisted since their previous record, A Head Full of Dreams, as rumours circulated that Coldplay would disband. It is the first album by the band to feature profanity (on the tracks "Trouble in Town", "Arabesque" and "Guns") and is also their second studio album, after Ghost Stories (2014), not to be supported by a major worldwide tour.

Everyday Life received positive reviews from music critics, who praised its experimental direction, the shift to politically charged lyrics and varied song styles in contrast to their old roots with albums like Parachutes and Viva la Vida or Death and All His Friends. However, others felt that the album lacked thematic consistency. Commercially, Everyday Life earned the band their eighth number-one album in the United Kingdom, their seventh Top 10 album in the United States and sold over a million copies globally.

The album was supported by four overall singles: "Orphans" and "Arabesque" in October 2019; "Everyday Life" in November 2019; and "Champion of the World" in February 2020. At the 63rd Grammy Awards Coldplay landed nominations for Best Recording Package and Album of the Year, marking the band's second nomination in the latter category and their first since Viva la Vida.

== Recording ==
Some tracks from Everyday Life have roots in 2009. As producer Dan Green explains: "We actually started this album just before Mylo Xyloto in 2009, there were songs [...] that had been around since then which just didn't seem to fit on other albums. The single 'Arabesque' was one of those". Rik Simpson, another longtime member of the production team, stated that the record differed in production style compared to previous works because three members of the band lived in the United Kingdom while lead singer Chris Martin lived in the United States. The band hoped to travel somewhere to inspire the global sounds of Everyday Life instead of be restricted to a single studio. Green set up a mobile studio, inspired by the jam sessions from Coldplay's previous world tour, that could be adapted to various locations. Recording began in December 2017 at Villa Tombolino in Tuscany, expanding to venues such as the Woodshed in Los Angeles; the Bakery and the Beehive in London; and studios in Johannesburg. Travelling around the world is reflected in the experimental mix of genre influences present on the album, including classical, afrobeat and jazz-fusion. It was one of the first non-reissue works to be mixed using Dolby Atmos technology, with the Atmos version made available on Amazon Music, Tidal and Apple Music.

== Composition ==
Everyday Life is a considerable shift in musical experimentation compared to the band's previous albums, with critics deeming it their most experimental release. Its release marks Coldplay's first studio double album, with the halves titled Sunrise and Sunset respectively (similarly to X&Y, which is split into an "X" half and a "Y" half, despite being a single album). The album includes a 30-second field recording of clock tower bells ringing the Westminster Quarters melody and spread across 8 tracks, entitled "God = Love", which serves as an interlude for each side of the album. The track titles spell the name of this section and are revealed when the CD is loaded into a computer.

When compared to previous albums released by the band, the lyrics make a stark contrast: even though it still showcases many themes of positivity, equality, unity, hope, legacy, the importance of emotions, and humanity, it also includes racism, police brutality, gun control, loss and pain, plus references of war in terrorism-inflicted countries. The song "Trouble in Town" includes a sample from a 2013 incident involving racially motivated profiling and harassment of a man by a Philadelphia police officer, it is the first Coldplay song to feature profanity (although it is the police officer in the sound recording who uses profanity rather than the track's lyrics), along with "Arabesque" and "Guns" (which both feature profanity in their actual lyrics). Martin described the album saying that:

"Every day is great and every day is terrible … Everyday Life is our reaction to the perceived negativity that's everywhere. And there is a lot of trouble, but there's also so much positivity and so much great life happening. So in a way, it's just trying to make sense of things, saying what we feel and what we see".

— Chris Martin, BBC Radio 1's Future Sounds interview 24 October 2019

== Promotion ==
On 13 October 2019, black-and-white posters featuring the band teasing the album, and the date "22 November 1919" appeared in various cities around the world, including São Paulo, Berlin, Hong Kong and Sydney. On 19 October, a video teaser featuring the same theme was also released. Two days later, several fans began receiving typewritten notes from the band in the mail.

"dear friends / my typing isn't very good i'm sorry / I and we hope wherever you are you're ok / for the last 100 years or thereabouts we have been working on a thing called Everyday Life / in the classifieds you might write 'double album for sale, one very careful owner' / one half is called 'sunrise', the other 'sunset' / it comes out 22 november / it is sort of how we feel about things / we send much love to you from hibernation / سلام و حب / chris, jonny, guy and Will Champion, esq".

— Coldplay, in a typewritten note to their fans

On 23 October, the track listing was announced by the band in the advertising sections of several newspapers around the world. This included the North Wales Daily Post, where guitarist Jonny Buckland "once had a holiday job". The 19 November edition of the New Zealand newspaper Otago Daily Times featured advertisements containing lyrics to the tracks from the album. The artwork for the album was created by Argentine artist Pilar Zeta, who worked on the artwork for the band's previous album A Head Full of Dreams.

The booklet included in the CD, vinyl, and digital download releases of the album feature lyrics for all tracks and credits. In the bifold of the book features a picture of a large billboard with "Music of the Spheres" in large text and "Coldplay coming soon" in the bottom left corner, teasing their following album Music of the Spheres. The poster also features a preliminary version of the album's artwork, the Map of the Spheres.

=== Live performances ===
During an online press conference on 1 November, Coldplay announced they would perform Everyday Life in two shows at the Amman Citadel in Jordan, on 22 November, the release date of the album. The first show showcased the band performing the first half of the album Sunrise at 4:00 a.m. GMT, and the second show featured the performance of Sunset at 2:00 p.m. GMT. The shows, which were livestreamed on YouTube, marked the band's first ever performances in the country. Both shows were promoted and advertised as YouTube Originals. The two shows were performed without an audience, but the following night the band performed their first public show at the Citadel. On 18 November, the band announced a one-off show at the London Natural History Museum on 25 November, with proceeds from the show to be donated to an environmental charity. However, the band announced that they would not play a world tour to promote the album until they had addressed concerns regarding travel and the environmental impact of the shows. After taking two years to craft a sustainability plan for touring, Coldplay embark on the Music of the Spheres World Tour in March 2022 in support of their following albums, Music of the Spheres and Moon Music. The tour incorporated songs from Everyday Life into the set list.

=== Singles ===
According to Martin, the album "doesn't really have singles and was never meant to. We had to pull a song off it". "Orphans" and "Arabesque" were released as a double lead on 24 October 2019, during the Annie Mac show on BBC Radio 1. On the next day, a music video for "Orphans" came out. Its companion piece, "Arabesque", however, does not have one. "Everyday Life" was then launched as a promotional single on 3 November. Its music video premiered on 9 December and the song was sent to United Kingdom and Italy's contemporary hit radio in the following weeks. Two days before the album's release, a music video for "Daddy" and a lyric video for "Champion of the World" were made available, the latter impacted radio stations across the United States as a promotional single on 25 February 2020. The "Cry Cry Cry" music video, which was co-directed by Dakota Johnson, was released on 14 February. The "Trouble in Town" video came out on 12 March.

== Critical reception ==
=== Reviews ===
Professional ratings
Aggregate scores
Source	Rating
AnyDecentMusic?	6.8/10
Metacritic	73/100
Review scores
Source	Rating
AllMusic	3.5/5 stars
The A.V. Club	B−
The Daily Telegraph	5/5 stars
Entertainment Weekly	B+
The Guardian	3/5 stars
The Independent	3/5 stars
NME	4/5 stars
Pitchfork	6.8/10
Rolling Stone	4/5 stars
The Times	4/5 stars

Everyday Life received generally positive reviews from music critics. At Metacritic, which assigns a normalised rating out of 100 to reviews from mainstream critics, the album has an average score of 73 based on 26 reviews, which indicates "generally favorable reviews", becoming the band's second highest-scored album on the website, behind A Rush of Blood to the Head. Writing for The Daily Telegraph, Neil McCormick acclaimed the album's experimentation, stating that Everyday Life "feels organic, analogue and playful as Coldplay dip into different musical genres", and further highlighted Martin's "golden gift for melody, almost simplistically direct lyrics and emotive crooning". Chris DeVille of Stereogum considered that the use of multiple genres worked "more often than not", and commended the band's "more nuanced" exploration of social issues, concluding that it was a "truly great album". In her review for NME, Charlotte Krol claimed that the record "is proof that Coldplay are more adventurous than they're often given credit for", although some of its songs are "sometimes more exciting in theory than in practice".

Other reviewers were less enthusiastic about the album's experimentation. Although The Guardian's Alexis Petridis considered it a "laudable intention", he found the album "wildly uneven" and was critical of the "lyrical vagueness" of various songs dealing with "sociopolitical matters", but praised "a couple of acoustic tracks with genuine emotional heft". In the same vein, Adam White of The Independent called the album a "valiant, if flawed, attempt to break from tradition" and a "fascinating, occasionally brilliant curio", but considered that the band were "still very much figuring out how to respond to a world that has become meaner, dirtier and crueller", nevertheless considering the effort admirable. Ludovic Hunter-Tilney of the Financial Times found the album "platitudinising", but considered Martin's songwriting "more focused than usual"; he additionally noted its "quirky production" and balancing of "contradictory urges to play it safe and take a risk".

=== Rankings ===
List of critic rankings
Publication	Description	Result	Ref.
AllMusic	Year in Review – Best of 2019	Placed	
GQ Italy	The Best Foreign Albums of 2019	Placed	
La Repubblica	The Best 30 Foreign Albums of 2019	Placed	
Los 40	The 30 Best Albums of 2019	14	
Muzikalia	Best International Albums of 2019	26	
NME	Albums of the Year 2019	43	
Panorama	The 20 Best International Albums of 2019	14	
Rolling Stone	The 50 Best Albums of 2019	28	
The Times	The 30 Best Albums of 2019	Placed	
Yahoo!	Jen Kucsak's Best Albums of 2019	9	

== Accolades ==
List of awards and nominations
Year	Ceremony	Category	Result	Ref.
2020	Broadcast Digital Awards	Best Sports or Live Event Coverage	Nominated	
2020	Rockol Awards	Best International Album – Public Vote	Nominated	
2021	Grammy Awards	Album of the Year	Nominated	
2021	Grammy Awards	Best Recording Package (Pilar Zeta)	Nominated	

== Commercial performance ==
Everyday Life debuted at number-one on the UK Albums Chart with 80,974 units sold, becoming Coldplay's eighth consecutive studio album to achieve the feat and the third-fastest selling record of the year in the United Kingdom. It reached number seven on the US Billboard 200 with 48,000 equivalent units. In Japan, the album debuted at number 10 with 5,886 physical copies. Coldplay also topped the French Albums chart with 20,996 units. The International Federation of the Phonographic Industry (IFPI) stated Everyday Life was the eleventh best-selling release of 2019, with 740,000 pure units. It has sold more than a million copies as of January 2020.

== Track listing ==
All tracks are written by Coldplay, with production from Rik Simpson, Dan Green and Bill Rahko, except where noted.

Everyday Life: Sunrise – standard edition track listing
No.	Title	Writer(s)	Producer(s)	Length
1.	"Sunrise"	Coldplay; Davide Rossi	Rossi	2:31
2.	"Church"	Coldplay; Amjad Sabri; Rossi; Stargate; Jacob Collier; Norah Shaqur	Simpson; Green; Rahko; Angel Lopez^{[a]}; Federico Vindver^{[a]}	3:50
3.	"Trouble in Town"			4:38
4.	"Broken"			2:30
5.	"Daddy"			4:58
6.	"WOTW / POTP"			1:16
7.	"Arabesque"	Coldplay; Drew Goddard; Femi Kuti; Paul Van Haver		5:40
8.	"When I Need a Friend"		Simpson; Green; Rahko; John Metcalfe	2:35

Everyday Life: Sunset – standard edition track listing
No.	Title	Writer(s)	Producer(s)	Length
1.	"Guns"			1:55
2.	"Orphans"	Coldplay; Moses Martin	Simpson; Green; Rahko; Max Martin^{[b]}; Lopez^{[a]}; Vindver^{[a]}	3:17
3.	"Èkó"			2:37
4.	"Cry Cry Cry"	Coldplay; Jacob Collier; Bertrand Berns; Jerry Ragovoy		2:47
5.	"Old Friends"			2:26
6.	"بنی آدم"	Coldplay; Alice Coltrane; Harcourt Whyte; Saadi Shirazi		3:14
7.	"Champion of the World"	Coldplay; Andy Monaghan; Scott Hutchison; Simon Liddell	Simpson; Green; Rahko; Max Martin^{[b]}; Lopez^{[a]}; Vindver^{[a]}	4:17
8.	"Everyday Life"	Coldplay; John Metcalfe	Simpson; Green; Rahko; Lopez^{[a]}; Vindver^{[a]}	4:18
Total length:				53:36

Everyday Life: Sunset – Japanese edition bonus track
No.	Title	Length
9.	"Flags"	3:36
Total length:		57:12

Notes

- ^{^a} Signifies an additional producer.
- ^{^b} Signifies a co-producer.
- Simpson, Green and Rahko are collectively referred to as The Dream Team.
- "Broken" is stylised as "BROKШN" on physical editions and "BrokEn" elsewhere.
- "WOTW / POTP" stands for "Wonder of the World / Power of the People".
- "God = Love" is only available on the CD edition of the album and works as an interlude between the Sunrise and Sunset halves of the record. It consists of a 30-second field recording of clock tower bells ringing the Westminster Quarters melody and spread across 8 tracks, bringing the total number of tracks of the CD versions up to 24. The track titles spell the name of this section and are revealed when the CD is loaded into a computer.
- "Church" features female vocals by Palestinian singer Norah Shaqur.
- "Broken" features a choir consisting of Mabvuto Carpenter, Denise Green, Stevie Mackey, Neka Hamilton, Surrenity XYZ, LaMarcus Eldrigde and Dorian Holley.
- "Arabesque" features vocals by Stromae, saxophone by Femi Kuti and oud by Le Trio Joubran.
- "When I Need a Friend" features the London Voices choir conducted by Ben Parry.
- "Orphans" features a choir consisting of Marwa Kreitem, Nadeen Fanous, Garine Antreassian, Bashar Murad, Norah Shaqur, Apple Martin, Moses Martin, Ben Oerlemans, Bill Rahko, Aluna and Jocelyn 'Jozzy' Donald.
- "Èkó" features backing vocals by Tiwa Savage.
- "بنی آدم" ("Bani Adam") features the voice of Dr. Shahrzad (Sherry) Sami reciting Saadi Shirazi's poem of the same name. The expression translates literally to "Children of Adam", or "Human Beings" within context.
- "Everyday Life" features backing vocals by Marianna Champion.
- "Church", "Cry Cry Cry" and "Everyday Life" feature backing vocals by Jacob Collier.
- "Flags" was released internationally on streaming services on 21 December 2020, following requests from fans.

Sample credits

- "Church" contains a sample of "Jaga Ji Laganay" (written by Amjad Sabri) and a beat inspired by Stargate (Mikkel Eriksen and Tor Hermansen).
- "Trouble in Town" contains a sample of "Jikelele" (performed by the children of the African Children's Feeding Scheme). It also features a recording of an incident involving racial profiling of pedestrians by a Philadelphia police officer in 2013.
- "Arabesque" contains a sample of the film Music Is the Weapon.
- "When I Need a Friend" contains a sample of the film Everything Is Incredible.
- "Cry Cry Cry" contains a sample of "Cry, Baby" (written by Bert Berns and Jerry Ragovoy).
- "بنی آدم" contains a sample of "The Sun" (written by Alice Coltrane).
- "بنی آدم" and "Champion of the World" contain a sample of "Otuto Nke Chukwu" (performed by Harcourt Whyte).
- "Champion of the World" contains a sample of "Los Angeles, Be Kind" (written by Scott Hutchison, Simon Lidell and Andy Monaghan).

== Personnel ==
Credits adapted from the "Orphans / Arabesque" liner notes and the CD pressing.

=== Recording ===
Coldplay

- Will Champion – drums and percussion, keyboards, backing vocals, acoustic guitar
- Jonny Buckland – guitars, keyboard
- Guy Berryman – bass guitar, keyboards
- Chris Martin – lead vocals, acoustic guitar, piano, keyboards

Additional vocalists

- Aluna – choir vocal
- Garine Antreassian – choir vocal
- Jocelyn 'Jozzy' Donald – choir vocal
- Nadeen Fanous – choir vocal
- Marwa Kreitem – choir vocal
- Apple Martin – choir vocal
- Moses Martin – choir vocal
- Bashar Murad – choir vocal
- Ben Oerlemans – choir vocal
- Bill Rahko – choir vocal
- Norah Shaqur – choir vocal, female vocals (track 2)
- Stromae – vocals

Additional musicians

- Omorinmade Anikulapo-Kuti – alto saxophone (track 7)
- Babatunde Ankra – trombone (track 7)
- Drew Goddard – guitar
- Dan Green – keyboards
- Samir Joubran – oud
- Wissam Joubran – oud
- Adnan Joubran – oud
- Femi Kuti – horn
- Made Kuti – orchestrionics
- Ayoola Magbagbeola – tenor saxophone
- Max Martin – keyboards
- Gbenga Ogundeji – trumpet
- Bill Rahko – keyboards
- Davide Rossi – strings
- Rik Simpson – keyboards

=== Production ===
Main

- Dan Green – producer (track 7, 10), programming
- Emily Lazar – mastering
- Max Martin – producer and programming
- Bill Rahko – producer (tracks 7, 10), programming
- Rik Simpson – producer (tracks 7, 10), programming
- Mark "Spike" Stent – mixing

Assistant

- Erwan Abbas – assistant engineering
- Chris Allgood – assistant mastering
- Lionel Capouillez – additional engineering
- Michael Freeman – assistant mixing
- Matt Glasbey – assistant engineering
- Pierre Houle – additional engineering
- Adnan Joubran – additional engineering
- Matt Latham – assistant engineering
- Baptiste Leroy – assistant engineering
- Bastien Lozier – additional engineering
- Issam Murad – assistant engineering
- Lance Robinson – additional engineering
- Davide Rossi – additional engineering
- Anthony De Souza – assistant engineering
- Federico Vindver – additional engineering
- Matt Wolach – assistant mixing

Artwork and design

- Pilar Zeta – design, art direction

== Charts ==
=== Weekly charts ===
Weekly chart performance
Chart (2019–2020)	Peak position
Argentine Albums (CAPIF)	1
Australian Albums (ARIA)	1
Austrian Albums (Ö3 Austria)	5
Belgian Albums (Ultratop Flanders)	1
Belgian Albums (Ultratop Wallonia)	1
Canadian Albums (Billboard)	3
Croatian International Albums (HDU)	2
Czech Albums (ČNS IFPI)	4
Danish Albums (Hitlisten)	6
Estonian Albums (Eesti Tipp-40)	3
Dutch Albums (Album Top 100)	1
Finnish Albums (Suomen virallinen lista)	8
French Albums (SNEP)	1
German Albums (Offizielle Top 100)	4
Greek Albums (IFPI Greece)	8
Hong Kong Albums (HKRMA)	2
Hungarian Albums (MAHASZ)	3
Irish Albums (IRMA)	5
Italian Albums (FIMI)	3
Japanese Albums (Oricon)	10
Japanese Combined Albums (Oricon)	8
Japanese Hot Albums (Billboard Japan)	8
Latvian Albums (LAIPA)	3
Lithuanian Albums (AGATA)	5
Mexican Albums (Top 100 Mexico)	1
New Zealand Albums (RMNZ)	2
Norwegian Albums (VG-lista)	1
Polish Albums (ZPAV)	4
Portuguese Albums (AFP)	2
Scottish Albums (Official Charts)	1
Slovak Albums (ČNS IFPI)	4
South Korean Retail Albums (Gaon)	21
Spanish Albums (Promusicae)	3
Swedish Albums (Sverigetopplistan)	9
Swiss Albums (Schweizer Hitparade)	1
Taiwanese Albums (Five Music)	1
UK Albums (Official Charts)	1
US Billboard 200	7
US Top Rock & Alternative Albums (Billboard)	1

=== Monthly charts ===
Monthly chart performance
Chart (2019–2020)	Peak position
Czech Albums (ČNS IFPI)	7
Japanese Albums (Oricon)	29
Slovak Albums (ČNS IFPI)	17
South Korean Retail Albums (Gaon)	66
Uruguayan Albums (CUD)	11

=== Year-end charts ===
Year-end chart performance
Chart (2019)	Position
Austrian Albums (Ö3 Austria)	69
Belgian Albums (Ultratop Flanders)	47
Belgian Albums (Ultratop Wallonia)	42
Dutch Albums (Album Top 100)	28
French Albums (SNEP)	49
German Albums (Offizielle Top 100)	74
Hungarian Albums (MAHASZ)	28
Italian Albums (FIMI)	51
Mexican Albums (Top 100 Mexico)	43
Polish Albums (ZPAV)	93
Portuguese Albums (AFP)	18
Spanish Albums (Promusicae)	37
Swiss Albums (Schweizer Hitparade)	20
UK Albums (OCC)	14
Worldwide Albums (IFPI)	11

Chart (2020)	Position
Belgian Albums (Ultratop Flanders)	67
Belgian Albums (Ultratop Wallonia)	81
Dutch Albums (Album Top 100)	69
French Albums (SNEP)	162
German Albums (Offizielle Top 100)	73
Portuguese Albums (AFP)	49
Spanish Albums (Promusicae)	64
Swiss Albums (Schweizer Hitparade)	21
US Top Alternative Albums (Billboard)	27
US Top Rock Albums (Billboard)	51

Chart (2022)	Position
Portuguese Albums (AFP)	80

== Certifications and sales ==
Certifications and sales
Region	Certification	Certified units/sales
Denmark (IFPI Danmark)	Gold	10,000^{‡}
France (SNEP)	Platinum	100,000^{‡}
Italy (FIMI)	Platinum	50,000^{‡}
Japan	—	17,155 (Note: Japanese physical sales for Everyday Life as of February 2020.)
Netherlands (NVPI)	Gold	20,000^{‡}
New Zealand (RMNZ)	Gold	7,500^{‡}
Poland (ZPAV)	Gold	10,000^{‡}
Spain (Promusicae)	Gold	20,000^{‡}
United Kingdom (BPI)	Platinum	300,000^{‡}
United States	—	199,000 (Note: American total sales for Everyday Life as of December 2020.)
^{‡} Sales+streaming figures based on certification alone.

== Release history ==
Release history and formats
Region	Date	Format	Label	Ref.
Various	22 November 2019	CD · LP · cassette · digital download · streaming	Parlophone · Atlantic · Warner Music	

== See also ==
- 2019 in British music
- List of number-one albums in Argentina
- List of number-one albums in Norway
- List of number-one albums of 2019 (Australia)
- List of number-one albums of 2019 (Belgium)
- List of number-one albums of 2019 (Mexico)
- List of number-one hits of 2019 (France)
- List of number-one hits of 2019 (Switzerland)
- List of UK Albums Chart number ones of the 2010s
