= Gholamhossein Yousefi =

Iranian writer and translator (1928–1990)

Gholamhossein Yousefi غلامحسین یوسفی
- Born: 23 January 1928; Tehran, Imperial State of Iran
- Died: 5 December 1990 (aged 63); Mashhad, Iran
- Resting place: Imam Reza shrine, Mashhad
- Occupations: Lecturer, writer and translator
- Known for: An outstanding professor of Persian literature and a proofreader of old literary texts.
- Notable work: Correction of Qaboos Nameh in 1966

Gholamhossein Yousefi (Persian: غلامحسین یوسفی; 23 January 1928 – 5 December 1990) was a distinguished writer, translator, proofreader, and Iranian professor of Persian literature.

== Life and education ==
Gholamhossein Yousefi was born in January 1928 in Mashhad. After completing his primary and secondary education in 1946, he relocated from Mashhad to Tehran to pursue further studies in Persian language and literature. In 1951, at the age of 24, he earned his doctorate in Persian language and literature while simultaneously obtaining a bachelor's degree in judicial and political law from Tehran University Law School. Following the establishment of the Faculty of Literature at Ferdowsi University of Mashhad in 1955, he began teaching literature history courses at this institution. Additionally, he served as the director of teacher training in Khorasan.

Until his retirement in 1979, Yousefi continued to impart knowledge through undergraduate and doctoral courses at Ferdowsi University. Notably, one of his specialized endeavors was the correction of old texts, contributing significantly to Iranian literature. He also embarked on research trips to France, the UK, and the US. Yousefi died in 1990 at the age of 63 due to a heart attack and was laid to rest next to the tomb of Ali Ibn Musa al-Reza.

== Opinions about Yousefi ==
Several scholars have expressed their admiration for Gholamhossein Yousefi's contributions. Iraj Afshar commended Yousefi's scientific integrity, describing him as a modest scholar passionate about Iranian knowledge and humanity's place within it, a rare combination of virtues. Bahauddin Khorramshahi praised Yousefi's meticulous proofreading of Golestan Saadi, labeling it as exemplary work. Furthermore, Mohammad Mahdi Naseh, a prominent professor of Persian literature who was once a student of Yousefi, lauded him as a genuine educator deeply invested in his students' academic growth. Naseh highlighted Yousefi's dedication to teaching, ensuring no moment in the classroom was squandered and emphasizing the importance of studying relevant sources and references alongside the curriculum.
