= Grammy Award for Best Original Jazz Composition =

Music award category

The Grammy Award for Best Original Jazz Composition was awarded from 1961 to 1967. In 1961 the award was called the Grammy Award for Best Jazz Composition of More Than Five Minutes Duration. The award was presented to the composer of the music.

Years reflect the year in which the Grammy Awards were presented, for works released in the previous year.

== Recipients ==
Year	Winner(s)	Title	Nominees	Ref.
1961	Miles Davis, Gil Evans	Sketches of Spain	Bob Brookmeyer for Blues Suite; Dave Brubeck for Blue Rondo a la Turk; Duke Ellington for Idiom '59; Jimmy Giuffre for Western Suite	
1962	Galt MacDermot (composer), Cannonball Adderley (performer)	"African Waltz"	André Previn for A Touch of Elegance; Dave Brubeck for Unsquare Dance; J.J. Johnson for Perceptions; Lalo Schifrin for Gillespiana	
1963	Vince Guaraldi (composer), Vince Guaraldi Trio (performer)	"Cast Your Fate to the Wind"	Paul Desmond for Desmond Blue; Eddie Sauter for Focus; Quincy Jones for Quintessence; Henry Mancini for Sounds of Hatari!; Charles Mingus for Tijuana Moods; Lalo Schifrin for Tunisian Fantasy	
1964	Steve Allen, Ray Brown (composer), Steve Allen (performer)	"Gravy Waltz"	Charles Mingus for The Black Saint and the Sinner Lady; Kenyon Hopkins for East Side-West Side; Dick Grove, Pete Jolly, Tommy Wolf for Little Bird; Newton Mendonco, Antonio Carlos Jobim for Meditation; Paul Desmond for Take Ten	
1965	Lalo Schifrin	"The Cat"	Bob Florence for Here and Now; Duke Ellington for Night Creature; Gerald Wilson for Paco; Quincy Jones for The Witching Hour; Dave Brubeck for Theme from Mr. Broadway	
1966	Lalo Schifrin (composer), Paul Horn (performer)	Jazz Suite on the Mass Texts	John Coltrane for A Love Supreme; Wes Montgomery for Bumpin'; Oscar Peterson for Canadiana Suite; Eddie Sauter for Mickey One; Duke Ellington, Billy Strayhorn for Virgin Islands Suite	
1967	Duke Ellington	"In the Beginning God"	Claus Ogerman for Jazz Samba; Lalo Schifrin for Marquis de Sade; Bill Evans for Time Remembered; Bob Brookmeyer for ABC Blues; John Handy for If Only We Knew	

== Sources ==
- Grammy Awards – Past Winners Search As noted in this article: search years are offset by one year.
