= Bahauddin Khorramshahi =

Iranian writer and translator

Bahauddin Khorramshahi; بهاءالدین خرمشاهی
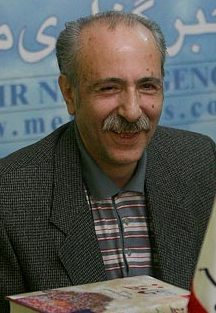
- Khorramshahi in the review meeting of his book of poetry in Mehr News Agency, 2006
- Born: April 1, 1945 (age 80); Qazvin
- Occupations: Translator; writer; editor; literary researcher; journalist; poet; university teacher
- Known for: Prominent Quran scholar

Bahauddin Khorramshahi or Baha'uddin Khorramshahi (Persian: بهاءالدین خرمشاهی; born April 1, 1945, in Qazvin) is an Iranian writer, translator, philosopher, journalist, satirist, lexicographer, researcher, poet, and university teacher. He is known for his contributions to Quranic studies and the interpretation of Hafez's poetry.

== Background ==
Bahauddin Khorramshahi completed his primary and secondary education in Qazvin. Initially enrolled in the field of medicine, he later switched his focus to Persian literature, studying under several renowned writers of the time, including Ghadam-Ali Sarami. He earned a master's degree in librarianship from Tehran University (1971 to 1973) and subsequently worked at the library service center.

His professors in Persian literature included, Zabihollah Safa, Mehdi Mohaghegh, Jafar Shahidi, Parviz Natel-Khanlari, Seyed Sadiq Goharin (fa), Abolhasan Shearani, and Abdul Hamid Badi Al-Zamani Kurdistani (fa). His success in Quranic research is indebted to the book "Qanun Tafsir" and its author, Seyyed Ali Kamali Dezfouli.

Bahauddin Khorramshahi married in 1973 and has three children named Hatif, Aref, and Hafez.

== Quranology ==
Khorramshahi is renowned as one of the scholars and translators of the Quran into Persian. His Quranic research encompasses three main areas: general books and articles, critical analysis of existing translations, and his own translation of the Quran.

His translation of the Quran is characterized by fluent, modern, and literary prose. Beyond translation and commentary, his work includes appendices covering various topics such as the translator's preface, articles on Quranic research, the preservation of the Quran, interpreting the Quran with the Quran, Persian vocabulary in the Quran, and a glossary.
