= Place du Louvre =

Square by the Louvre in Paris, France

Coordinates: 48.86°N 2.3405°E

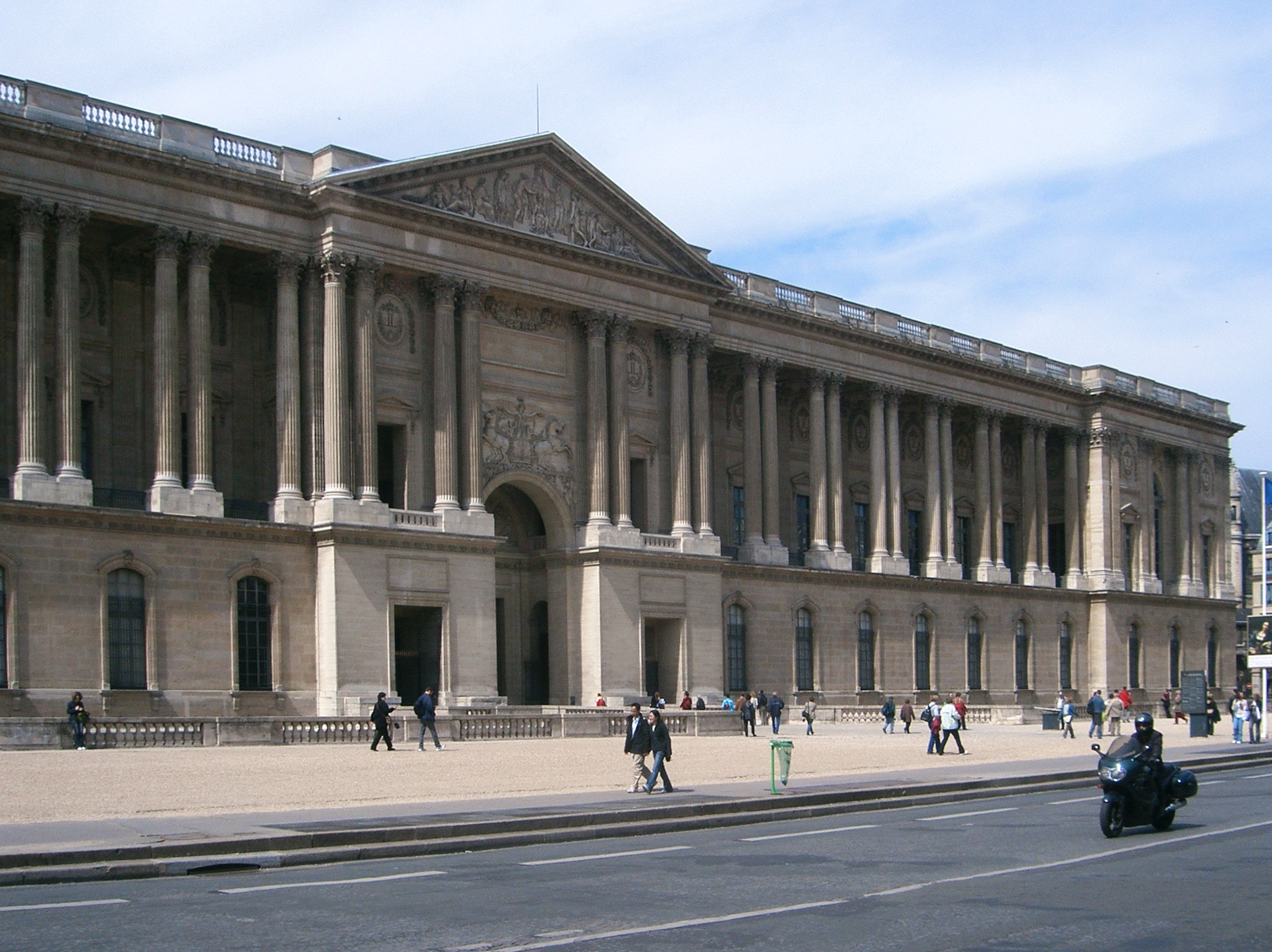
The Colonnade of the Palais du Louvre overlooks the Place du Louvre.

The Place du Louvre (French pronunciation: [plas dy luvʁ]) is a square immediately to the east of the Palais du Louvre in Paris, France. To the south is the Quai du Louvre and beyond that is the River Seine. The Hôtel du Louvre is also located here, between the Louvre Palace and the Palais Royal.

The clearing of cluttered buildings to create the square was accomplished by Baron Haussmann in the 1850s.
