= Ghadam-Ali Sarami =

Iranian author and poet (born 1944)

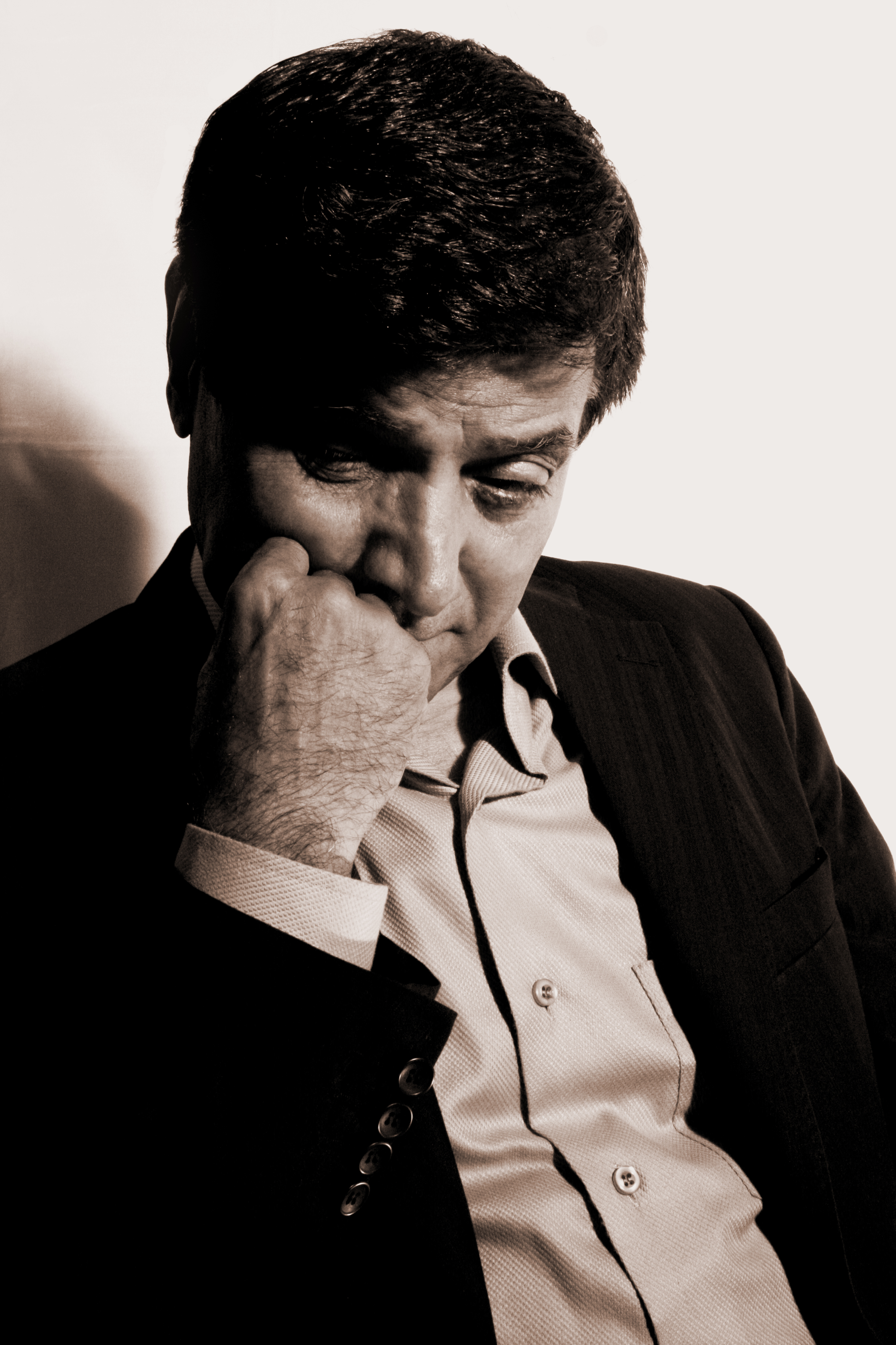
- Ghadam-Ali Sarami, Tehran, Iran, 2010
- Born: 23 June 1944 (age 82); Ramhormoz, Khouzestan, Iran
- Education: Bachelor of Arts
- Alma mater: University of Tehran
- Occupation: Novelist
- Children: 2 daughters, 3 sons
- Writing career
- Genre: Children's literature
- Website: www.meyenab.com

Ghadam-Ali Sarami (Persian: قدمعلی سرّامی, also Romanized as Ghadam-Ali Sarrami) is an Iranian author and poet. He was born in Ramhormoz, a small town in Khuzestan Province, southwest of Iran. In 1986, he received a Ph.D. in Persian language and literature from University of Tehran, Iran. He is an associate professor of Persian language and literature at University of Zanjan and an expert in Ferdowsi's Shahnameh (lit. The Epic Book of Kings), Tarikh-i Bayhaqi (lit. Bayhaghi's History), and Hafez, Sa'di, Rumi, and other masters of Persian literature and poetry.

== Education ==
- Ph.D., University of Tehran, Iran, 1986 (Persian language and literature)
- M.A., University of Tehran, Iran, 1970 (Persian language and literature)
- B.A., University of Tehran, Iran, 1968 (Persian language and literature)

== Books ==
- The Four Seasons of I-Do-Love-You. Tehran, Iran: Elm Publications, Spring 2008.
- From Never to Ever (A collection of Twenty Literary and Cultural Articles). Tehran, Iran: Tarfand Publications 2004.
- The Seeds of Carrots. Tehran, Iran: Tirgaan Publications, 2003.
- Until the Birth of Morning We Must Sing (A Collection of Poems). Tehran, Iran: Hadeeth Publications 2003.
- The Bathhouse of Colors. Tehran, Iran: Tarfand Publications: 2003.
- Simorgh and the Sun. Tehran, Iran: Tarfand publications 2002.
- The Magic Spoon. Tehran, Iran: Tarfand Publications, 2002.
- Clear and Easy as Water (A collection of Poems Composed for My Youngest Daughter). Tehran, Iran: Nikan Ketab Publications, 2001.
- Five Articles on Children's Literature. Tehran, Iran: Tarfand Publications, 2001.
- Solomon's Rug. Tehran, Iran: Ruzegar Publications, 1999.
- The Complete Works of Hafiz, editor, Tehran, Iran: Hessamzadeh Publications, 1996.
- From Two Points to Everything: A collection of Poems Tehran, Iran: Mashyaneh Publications, 1995.
- Az Khaak taa Aflaak (From Earth to Heaven): A survey of sonnets and masnavis of Mowlana Jalaleddin Balkhi (Rumi). Tehran, Iran: Chapar-e Farzanegan Publications, 1991.
- The Green Legend (A children Story), Tehran, Iran: Shifteh Publications, 1991.
- The Red Balloon (A children Story), Tehran, Iran: Ehya-ye Ketab Publications, 1991.
- A Boy Who Knew Three Languages (A children Story), Tehran, Iran: Kavir Publications, 1991.
- Fireflies, Silver Bowl and I, a story for children. Tehran, Iran: (Shifteh Publications, 1990). This book was published twice in the same year. In addition, it has been translated to English, French, German, Hindi, Italian, Romanian languages in order to be published internationally.
- Sweeter Than Flight, a poem for children, Tehran, Iran: Published by The Institute for the Intellectual Development of Children and Young Adults, 1988. The Council of the Children’s Books selected it as the Best Book of the Year, and the writer received the special plaque as well as a cash prize. In addition, the story was turned into a puppet show that was performed in the City Theater by Mrs. Marziyyeh Mahboob.
- From the Color of Flower to the Sting of Thorn: The morphology of the tales of Shahnameh. Tehran, Iran: Elmi-Farhangi Publications, 1982, 1994 and 2000. This book was selected as the only admirable book in literature by the Council of The Best Book of The Year of the Ministry of Culture and Islamic Guidance.
- Parting, a story for children based on a folkloric tale, Tehran, Iran: Published by The Institute for the Intellectual Development of Children and Young Adults, 1979. The ninth edition is scarce. Altogether, 210, 000 copies have been distributed. The Institute has translated and published this work in English, Arabic, Turkish, Kurdish, and Baluchi.
- A Tale of Friendship, a story for children, Tehran, Iran: Published by The Institute for the Intellectual Development of Children and Young Adults, 1976. The sixth edition of this book scarce.
- With This Crimson Silence, Tehran, Iran: Safialishah Publishing Agency, 1967 and 1975. This book is a collection of my poems the sale of which was banned in both years.
- The Smile of Desire, (Navaye Mellat Publications, Ahvaz, Iran 1963). This book is a collection of the poems I composed in my teens. The introduction was written by Dr. Mohammad E. Bastani-Parizi and my professor Dr. Majdoddin Kayvani.

== Poems, stories and articles ==
In addition to the above, he has published hundreds of poems, stories, and articles in the newspapers, literary journals and anthologies. The following is a selected list.

=== Articles on literary criticism ===
1. Criticism on the poetry of Parvin E’tesami, Mirzadeh Eshgi, and Aref Qazvini, published in Ettela’at newspaper in 1976–1977.
2. “The Bird in Whose Nest I Found the Key to the Garden”, a criticism on the Persian poems of Ighbal Lahuri, published in Pishgam Magazine, 1976.
3. A criticism on The Art of Loving by Erich Fromm, published in Pishgam Magazine, 1976.
4. A criticism on Jonathan Livingston Seagull: A Story by Richard Bach. Published in Pishgam Magazine.
5. A criticism on Nima Yushig's poetry, published in the Ettela’at Newspaper, 1975.
6. A criticism on From Saba to Nima by Yahya Arianpour, published in Ettela’at newspaper. In the preface to the next edition of his book, the author declared that this was the best criticism the literary world had ever seen.
7. A criticism on Reza Davari's critique of The Rey Philosopher by Mahdi Mohaghegh. Published in Ferdowsi Journal of Arts and Literature in 1965.
8. “Resurrection of Sonnet”, a criticism on the poems of Simin Behbahani. Published twice in two separate issues of Ferdowsi Journal of Arts and Literature.

=== Articles on literature and culture ===
1. “Poverty Store”, an introduction to Masnavi-e Mowlavi by Mowlana Jalaleddin Balkhi (Rumi), Behzad Publications, (1991).
2. “From Watching to Versifying”, a new look at the complete works of Sa’di, published in Tahghighat-e Eslami Journal.
3. “From Never to Ever”, a review of the Tazkarat-al-Owlia by Attar-e Neyshaburi, published in Tahghighat-e Eslami Journal.
4. “A Glance at the Iranian Games in the Past”, Puyeh Magazine, a special edition published by The Institute for the Intellectual Development of Children and Young Adults.
5. “Participation of Children in the Ancient Literature of Iran”, Quarterly of The Institute for the Intellectual Development of Children and Young Adults.
6. “A Skim Through the Lullabies of Iran and The World”, Puyesh Magazine, No. 1.
7. “Visiting Abu Reyhan-e Biruni”, Tehran Mosavar Magazine, 1977.
8. “A World Sitting in a Corner”, published in Karname-ye Zarrin, edited by A. Dehbashi. A collection of articles written by Iranian scholars and dedicated to the subject of life and works of the famous literary scholar, Dr. Abdol Hossein Zarrinkub.

== Other creative work ==
=== Audio recordings ===
In commemoration of the millennium anniversary of the composing of Shahnameh, he wrote the script of an audio tape titled “Sug-e Sohrab” (Mourning Sohrab). The composer of the music was Hossein Yussef-Zamani. The tape was distributed at the time of the commemoration.

=== Filmstrips ===
During his years of employment at the Institute for the Intellectual Development of Children and Young Adults, he authored a total of sixteen filmstrips. These were made into films and the films were distributed to all branch libraries of the Institute nationwide. The following is a selected list:

1. “Musician Cypress”, based on the story of Barbad in Shahnameh.
2. “Suspending in the Air”, based on the story of Akvan-e Div in Shahnameh.
3. “Rustam and Esfandiar”, based on the story of Rustam and Esfandiar in Shahnemeh.
4. “Rainbow of Images”, an extract from lines of Shahnameh.
5. “The Star in the Sky of Literature”, based on Parvin E’tesami's poetry. This filmstrip has been published as a book.
6. “The Tree of Wishes”, a fictional story in verse and prose.
7. “How Many Apricots Are There in the World?” A fictional story in prose.
8. “The Queen of Flowers”, (prose), based on a folkloric tale.
9. “Red-Scarved Child” (verse), based on a folkloric tale.
10. “Ivory Chamber” (prose), based on a folkloric tale.
11. “The Hundredth Gold” (prose), based on a folkloric tale.

=== Plays and works for the stage ===
- Hejamatian, a play for young adults. Performed before the revolution.
- Ghu-Ghu-Li-Ghu-Ghu (Cock-a-doodle-doo), a play for children. Distributed as a video tape.
- Sweeter Than Flight, a puppet show based on the book by that title. Performed in the City Theater. Directed by Mrs. Marziyeh Mahboob.

=== Radio lectures ===
Ten lectures on cultural and literary subject matters delivered in Pahneye Kherad program of Khorasan Radio.

=== Television programs ===
In 1976, he wrote the filmstrips of two television series:

- “Listen to the Reed Pipe”, a program introducing Iranian poets to the public.
- “The City of the Sun”, a program of review and criticism of the latest published books.
