= Adieu Gary =

- Adieu Gary poster
- Directed by: Nassim Amaouche
- Produced by: Jean-Philippe Andraca: Christian Bérard
- Starring: Jean-Pierre Bacri: Dominique Reymond; Yasmine Belmadi
- Cinematography: Samuel Collardey
- Edited by: Julien Lacheray
- Music by: Le Trio Joubran
- Production companies: Les Films A4: Rhône-Alpes Cinéma; Studio Canal
- Release dates: 17 May 2009 (Cannes); 22 July 2009 (France)
- Running time: 75 minutes
- Country: France
- Language: French
- Box office: $751,737

Adieu Gary (also known as Goodbye Gary Cooper) is a 2009 French film directed by Nassim Amaouche in his feature directorial debut. It premiered in the Critics' Week section at the 2009 Cannes Film Festival, where it was awarded the Critics' Week Grand Prix.

== Plot ==
In the middle of a neglected French suburb, a family and close friends day-dream of life and love. In his debut feature writer/director Nassim Amaouche introduces the audience to their world, revealing the ties between the various characters, crafted by a brilliant French-Moroccan ensemble cast that includes Jean-Pierre Bacri, Dominique Reymond, Yasmine Belmadi and Alexandre Bonnin. The film evolves around conscientious Francis, his recently liberated ex-con son Samir, neighbour (and Francis' illicit lover) Maria and her imaginative son José - who deals with all this by escaping into a Wild West fantasy world where his father is a heroic cowboy played by Gary Cooper.

== Cast ==
- Jean-Pierre Bacri as Francis
- Dominique Reymond as Maria
- Yasmine Belmadi as Samir
- Mhamed Arezki as Icham
- Sabrina Ouazani as Nejma
- Hab-Eddine Sebiane as Abdel
- Alexandre Bonnin as José
- Bernard Blancan as Michel
- Frédéric Hulne as The doctor
- Mohamed Mahmoud Ould Mohamed as Abdel's and Nejma's father
- Abdelhafid Metalsi as The new neighbour
- Mariam Koné as The saleswoman
