= Tamaas =

Studio album by Samir Joubran & Wissam Joubran
- Released: 2003

Tamaas is the first album by Samir Joubran duo with his brother Wissam Joubran, released in 2003 labelled "daquí", by Harmonia Mundi.

== Track listing ==
1. "Khiyanat Mariha" - 4:11
2. "Tamaas" - 7:49
3. "Tanaas" - 6:05
4. "Sama'E Bayat" - 7:30
5. "Khalaas" - 10:18
6. "Takaseem" - 6:36
7. "Ramallah August 10" - 10:09
8. "El Nesf El Akhar/Astoria" - 9:08
