= Wissam Joubran =

Palestinian composer and oud player

Wissam Joubran وسام جبران
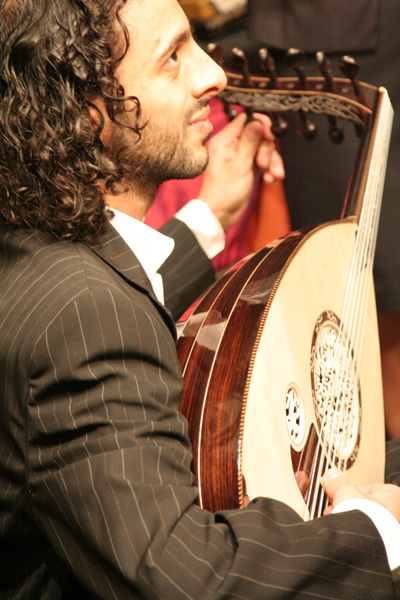
- Wissam Joubran

Background information
- Born: February 19, 1983 (age 42); Nazareth
- Instrument: oud
- Member of: Le Trio Joubran
- Website: wissamjoubran.com

Wissam Hatem Joubran (Arabic: وسام جبران; born February 19, 1983) is a Palestinian composer, oud (an Arabic lute) virtuoso, and master lute maker. He is a member of the group Le Trio Joubran.

== Biography ==
Joubran was born in Nazareth, Israel. The third child of oud maker Hatem Joubran, and the brother of oud players Samir Joubran and Adnan Joubran.

He is considered as the fourth generation of the family Joubran for making string instruments.

Joubran showed musical talent early in his life, at five, his fingers were already sensitive to the touch of wood, and at six, he made his first instrument by his own. Joubran start learning the violin, and moved to the oud by the age of seven. The dexterity of Joubran’s fingers, as well as his sense of music leads him to assist his father in crafting his ouds. Thus, the two experiences nurtured one another for the greatest benefit of the instrument and of its musicality. He is noted for his mastery of conveying musical structure, and for a deep sensitivity to the Arab maqamat scale system. This conviction, allied to an unwavering conviction in his own ability to improve upon the traditional methods used in manufacturing the oud, lead him in 2001 to the northern Italian city of Cremona.

Joubran was under the direction of Maestro Giorgio Cè. A year later, he was awarded a special prize in the Institute of Antonio Stradivarius, for the best violin maker.

He improved the model of the oud and produced instruments capable of yielding greater power of tone.

In 2002, Joubran shared the stage with his brother Samir performing concerts in Europe. Joubran performed musical interludes at readings of Mahmoud Darwish's poetry. Then, in 2003 with the album "Tamaas", Joubran's international career takes off.

In 2005, Wissam became a Master string instruments maker. He was recognized as the first Arab luthier to have graduated from Antonio Stradivarius Institute.

Wissam, like his father before him, continues in the line of his ancestors.

In 2005 Wissam, Samir and Adnan Joubran formed "Le Trio Joubran". The trio has released several albums encompassing both traditional and modern Arabic styles. From 2004 to 2008, they performed at least 150 concerts per year.

In 2007 Wissam and his brothers released the album "Majâz", the Joubran Trio's second opus, it is the Arabic translation of the word "metaphor".

Joubran has composed the original scores for many films, amongst which, "Adieu Gary" directed by Nassim Amaouche, "The Last Flight (2009 film)" (Le Dernier Vol), directed by Karim Dridi.

== Awards ==
In 2009, he won the Arab Muhr award, Dubai International Film Festival

- Best soundtrack for Adieu Gary, directed by Nassim Amaouche

In 2011, he won for the second time the "Arab Muhr" award, Dubai International Film Festival

- Best soundtrack for The Last Friday, directed by Yahya Al Abdallah

== Discography ==
- 2003 : Tamaas
- 2005 : Randana
- 2007 : Majâz
- 2009 : À l'Ombre des mots
- 2009 : Le Dernier Vol
- 2011 : AsFâr
