= Bukhara magazine =

Bukhara magazine (Persian: مجله بخارا) is a Persian-language magazine published in Tehran and edited by Ali Dehbashi. The magazine began publication in 1998 and is published on a monthly basis. The content consists of scholarly articles on Persian history, art, philosophy, literature, culture, and Iranology. The magazine has published several special issues on great world authors such as Rabindranath Tagore, Günter Grass, Osip Mandelstam, Umberto Eco and Virginia Woolf.

Ali Dehbashi was the editor of the monthly magazine Kelk (کِلک), a prominent literary publication on Iranian Studies with a considerable number of readers, mostly Iranian university professors and world Iranologists. Ninety-four issues of the magazine comprising more than twenty thousand pages have been published, with contributions from notables such as Shafiee Kadkani, Abdolhossein Zarrinkoob, Ahmad Mahdavi Damghani, Saeed Hamidian, Djalal Khaleghi Motlagh, Ali Ravaghi, Fereydoon Moshiri, Ghamar Aryan, Ezatollah Fouldvand, Bahram Beyzai and others.

Since January 2006, Bukhara magazine regularly holds commemorative ceremonies for different subjects related to Iranology. They have been mostly held in Tehran and are open to public. As of July 2026, a number of 960 Bukhara Nights (شب‌های بخارا in Persian) have been successfully held.

Bukhara′s official representative/distributor in North America is the Toronto-based weekly publication Salam Toronto.
