= Ali Dehbashi =

Iranian journalist, Iranologist, researcher and writer

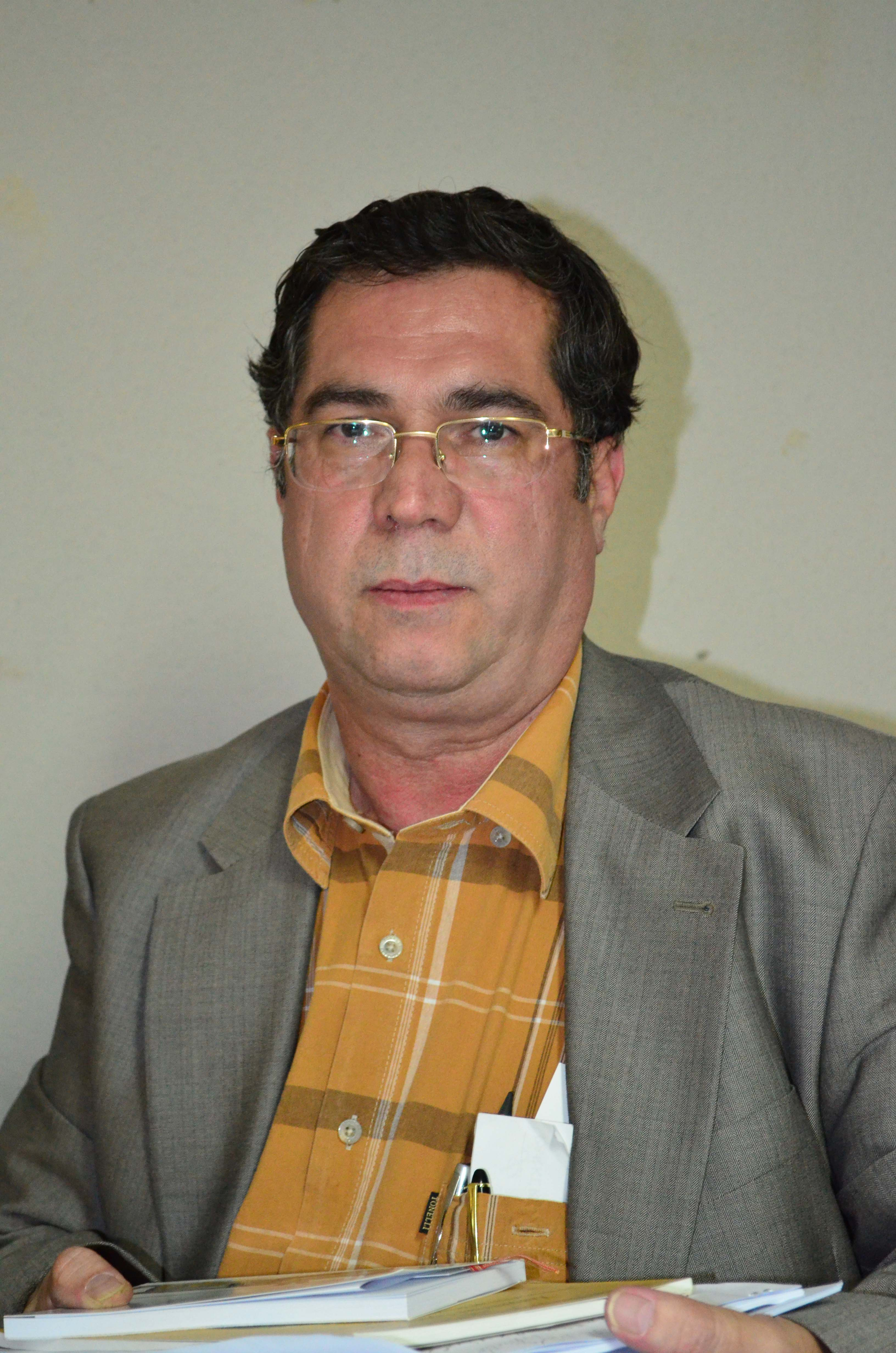
- Dehbashi in 2013
- Born: Ali Akbar Jafar Dehbashi; 21 March 1958 (age 68); Tehran, Iran
- Occupations: Writer, journalist, chief editor

Ali Dehbashi (Persian: علی دهباشی، born March 21, 1958) is an Iranian journalist, Iranologist, researcher and writer. He is the writer and editor-in-chief of Bukhara magazine, a periodical magazine on arts and culture in Persian published in Tehran.

Ali Dehbashi is a member of Societas Iranologica Europaea (European Iranian Studies Society), and has attended many meetings in its periodical conferences in different universities and cultural centers all over the world.

In 2014, Ali Dehbashi was prosecuted for publishing content against Islamic values in the Bukhara Literary Journal.

== Works and publications ==
- 1982 – Travelogue of Mozafaraddin Shah to Europe, edited by Ali Dehbashi, first edition, Ketab-e- Farzan Publications, Tehran
- 1983 – Journals of Dr. Ghassem Ghani (First volume: My life), introduction by Ali Dehbashi, first edition, Aban publications, Tehran
- 1983 – The Conqueror of the Jungle (Memories by General Major Denstroville), translated by Hossein Ansari, Introduction by Ali Dehbashi, first edition, Farzan Publications, Tehran
- 1983 – Assarol-ajam (Persian works) by Mohammad Nassir Hosseini (Forsat-dowleh Shirazi), edited by Ali Dehbashi, first edition, Negah Publications, Tehran; Second edition, Beh Did Publications 1999
- 1983 – Travelogue of Shirley Brothers, translated by Avaness, edited by Ali Dehbashi, first edition, Negah Publications, Tehran; Second edition, 1999, Beh Did Publications
- 1983 – Travelogue of Chardin (Isfahan part), translated by Hossein Arizi, introduction by Ali Dehbashi, first edition, Negah Publications, Tehran 1983
- 1984 – Travelogue of Haj Sayyah to Europe, edited by Ali Dehbashi, first edition, Nasher Publications, Tehran; Second edition, Sokhan and Shahb Sagheb Publications, 1999; Third edition, Sokhan and Shahb Sagheb Publications, 2000
- 1985 – The memorial volume of Jalal Al Ahamd (first volume), edited by Ali Dehbashi, first edition, Payk Publications; Second edition, Beh Did Publications, 1999
- 1985 – Letters by Jalal Al Ahmad (first volume), edited by Ali Dehbashi, first edition by Payk Publication; Second edition, Bozorgmehr Publications, 1986; Third edition, Beh Did Publications, 1999
- 1987 – Letters by Kamalalmolk, edited by Ali Dehbashi, first edition, Bozorgmehr Publications, Tehran; Second edition Beh Negar Publications, Tehran 1989
- 1985 – The memorial volume of Kamal-al-molk, edited by Darab Behnam Shabahang and Ali Dehbashi, Chekameh Publications, Tehran; Second edition, Beh Did Publications, 2000
- 1989 – Book of Beh Negar, edited by Ali Dehbashi, Beh Negar Publications, Tehran
- 1989 – Fath-Nameh Nayebi (Nayebi’s Letter of Victory) composed by Montakhabolsadat Yaghmaie, with an introduction by Malekolmovarekhin Sepehr, edited and described by Ali Dehbashi, Esparak Publications, Tehran
- 1989 – Toghyane Nayebian Dar Jaryane Enghelab Mashrootiat Iran (Nayebian Revolt During Iranian Revolution for Constitution), by Mohammad Reza Khosravi, edited by Ali Dehbashi, Beh Negar Publications, Tehran
- 1989 – Political Memoirs of Iraj Eskandari, edited by Ali Dehbashi, first edition, Elmi Publications, Tehran; Second edition, Elmi Publications, 1989; Third edition, Elmi Publications, 2000
- 1990 – Selected Poems by Parvin Etesami, with an introduction by Ali Dehbashi, Ghoghnoos Publications, Tehran 1990
- 1991 – The memorial Volume of Parvin Etesami, edited by Ali Dehbashi, first edition, Donyaye Madar Publications, Tehran 1991
- Dehbashi, Ali (1991). Selected ancient flower ranges of articles about Ferdowsi's Shahnameh Jalal Khaleghi Mutlaq. Modaber Publications. p. 501. ISBN 978-6-005-94278-1.
- 1993 – Gol Ranjhaye Kohan (Ancient Endeavors) by Dr.Jalal Khaleghi Motlagh, edited by Ali Dehbashi, first edition, Nashr Markaz Publications, Tehran
- 1997 – The memorial volume of Dr. Abdol Hossein Zarrinkoob, edited by Ali Dehbashi, first edition, Cultural Heritage Society and Center of Islamic Large Encyclopedia Publications, Tehran
- 1997 – The memorial volume of Abdolhassan Saba, edited by Ali Dehbashi, first edition, Vida Publications, Tehran
- 1998 – Dar Tariki Hezareha (In the Darkness of Thousands) by Iraj Eskandari, edited by Ali Dehbashi, first edition, Ghatre Publications, Tehran
- 1998 – The memorial volume of Seyed Mohammad Ali Jamalzadeh, edited by Ali Dehbashi, first edition, Sales Publications, Tehran
- 1998 – The Rubaiyat of Omar Khayyam, with an introduction by Ali Dehbashi, first edition, Honar Saraye Gooya Publications, Tehran; Second edition, Honar Saraye Gooya Publications, 2002
- 1999 – The memorial volume of Sohrab Shahid Sales, edited by Ali Dehbashi, first edition, Sokhan and Shahab, Tehran 1999
- 1999 – The memorial volume of Allame Mohammad Ghazvini, edited by Ali Dehbashi (with an introduction by Dr. Abdol Hossein Zarinkoob), first edition, Ketab va Farhand Publications, Tehran
- 1999 – Memories of Ardeshir Avanessian, edited by Ali Dehbashi, first edition, Sokhan and Shahab Publications, Tehran; second edition Sokhan and Shahab Publications, 2000
- 1999 – Ayeneh Ebrat, memories of Dr. Nassrollah Saifpour Fatemi, edited by Ali Dehbashi, first edition, Sokhan and Shahab Publications, Tehran
- 1999 – Selected works of Seyed Mohammad Ali Jamalzadeh, edited by Ali Dehbashi, first edition, Sokhan and Shahab Publications, Tehran
- 1999 – As Soft As Rain (The memorial volume of Fereidon Moshiri) edited by Ali Dehbashi, first edition, Sokhan and Shahab Publications, Tehran; Second edition Sokhan and Shahab Publications, Tehran, 2000
- 1999 – Memories of Prices Arfa, edited by Ali Dehbashi, first edition, Sokhan and Shahab Publications, Tehran; Second edition Sokhan and Shahab Publications, Tehran 2000
- 1999 – Writing Stories by Seyed Mohammad Ali Jamalzadeh edited by Ali Dehbashi, first edition, Sokhan and Shahab Publications, Tehran
- 1999 – Memories of Seyed Mohammad Ali Jamalzdeh, edited by Iran Afshar and Ali Dehbashi, first edition, Sokhan and Shahab Publications, Tehran 1999
- 2000 – Bitter and Sweet by Seyed Mohammad Ali Jamalzadeh, edited by Ali Dehbashi, first edition, Sokhan Publications, Tehran
- 2000 – A Brief Familiarity with Hafez by Seyed Mohammad Ali Jamalzadeh, edited by Ali Dehbashi, first edition, Sokhan Publications, Tehran
- 2000 – Once Upon A Time by Seyed Mohammad Ali Jamalzadeh, edited by Ali Dehbashi, first edition, Sokhan Publications, Tehran
- 2000 – The End of the Tale by Seyed Mohammad Ali Jamalzadeh, edited by Ali Dehbashi, first edition, Sokhan Publications, Tehran
- 2000 – Gholtashan Divan by Seyed Mohammad Ali Jamalzadeh, edited by Ali Dehbashi, first edition, Sokhan Publications, Tehran
- 2005 – The History of Iran-Russia Relations by Seyed Mohammad Ali Jamalzadeh, edited by Ali Dehbashi, third edition, Sokhan Publications, Tehran
- 2005 – Jamali Kashkool by Seyed Mohammad Ali Jamalzadeh, edited by Ali Dehbashi, first edition, Sokhan Publications, Tehran
- 2005 – Hezar Bishe by Seyed Mohammad Ali Jamalzadeh, edited by Ali Dehbashi, second edition, Sokhan Publications, Tehran
- 2005 – Ganje Shaygan Seyed Mohammad Ali Jamalzadeh, edited by Ali Dehbashi, third edition, Sokhan Publications, Tehran
- 2000 – Kharnameh (Donkey Book) by Mohammad Hassan Khan Etemadolsaltaneh edited by Ali Dehbashi, first edition, Ketab Panjareh Publications, Tehran; Second edition, Ketab Panjareh Publications Tehran; Third edition, Ketab Panjareh Tehran 2000; Fourth edition, Ketab Panjareh, Tehran
- 2000 – Golden Record (The Memorial Volume of Dr.Abdol Hossein Zarinkoob) edited by Ali Dehbashi, first edition, Daftar Pazhooheshhaye Farhangi Publications, Tehran
- 2000 – Political Diaries of Dr.Fereidoun Keshavarz, edited by Ali Dehbashi, first edition, Nashr Abi Publications, Tehran
- 2000 – Interviews (Collection of interviews with cultural, Art, and Iranology celebrities), edited by Ali Dehbashi, Sedaye Moasser Publications, Tehran
- 2000 – Asman va Risman by Seyed Mohammad Jamalzadeh, edited by Ali Dehbashi, first edition, Sokhan Publications, Tehran
- 2001 – The memorial volume of Sadegh Choobak, edited by Ali Dehbashi, first edition, Saless Publications, Tehran
- 2001 – Socio-Political Life of Mozaffar Firooz, edited by Ali Dehbashi, first edition, Sokhan and Shahab Publications, Tehran
- 2001 – Old and New by Seyed Mohammad Jamalzadeh, edited by Ali Dehbashi, first edition, Sokhan Publications, Tehran
- 2001 – Short Tales for Children with Beard by Seyed Mohammad Jamalzadeh, edited by Ali Dehbashi, first edition, Sokhan Publications, Tehran
- 2001 – The Old Days (Memories of Dr.Gholam Hossein Foroutan), edited by Ali Dehbashi, first edition, Sokhan Publications, Tehran
- 2001 – Seven Countries by Seyed Mohammad Jamalzadeh, edited by Ali Dehbashi, first edition, Sokhan Publications, Tehran
- 2001 – The memorial volume of Sadegh Hedayat, edited by Ali Dehbashi, first edition, Saless Publications, Tehran
- 2001 – Returning Back (The memorial volume of Dr.Abdol Hossein Zarinkoob) edited by Ali Dehbashi, first edition, Behdad Publications, Tehran
- 2001 – The memorial volume of Seyed Abolghassem Enjavi Shirazi, edited by Ali Dehbashi, Sokhan Publications
- 2002 – House of Daee Yusef (Memories of Atabak Fatthollazadeh), edited by Ali Dehbashi, Ghatre Publications, first edition
- 2001 – On the Same Leaven by Seyed Mohammad Ali Jamalzadeh edited by Ali Dehbashi, first edition, Sokhan Publications, Tehran
- 2003 – The Old Discourses by Seyed Mohammad Ali Jamalzadeh edited by Ali Dehbashi, first edition, Afkar Publications, Tehran
- 2003 – Talking of Mothers through Works of Poets, edited by Ali Dehbashi, first edition, Bahar Sabz Publications, Tehran
- 2003 – Ghanbar Ali by Seyed Mohammad Ali Jamalzadeh edited by Ali Dehbashi, first edition, Sokhan Publications, Tehran
- 2003 – The Gifts of the Other World (A Review of the Life and Works of Mowlana) edited by Ali Dehbashi, first edition, Sokhan Publications, Tehran
- 2003 – Oral History of Iranian Publishing, edited by Abdol Hossein Azarang and Ali Dehbashi, first edition, Ghoghnoos Publications, Tehran
- 2003 – Oral History of Iranian Press, edited by Seyed Farid Ghassemi and Ali Dehbashi, first edition, Ghoghnoos Publications, Tehran
- 2003 – A Woman with A Garden of Roses (The Festschrift of Simin Behbahani) edited by Ali Dehbashi, Negah Publications, Tehran
- 2004 – Isfahan (A Photo Album of Seven Photographers) text written by Ali Dehbashi, Gooya Publications, Tehran
- Dehbashi, Ali (2004). Mey-o Mina. Seyri Dar Zendegi va Asar-e Hakim Omar Khayyam Neyshaburi. "Wine and Wineglass; Collected Articles on Life and Works of Omar Khayyam.". Gooya Publications. p. 936. ISBN 978-9-649-49815-7.
- Dehbashi, Ali (2004). Bar sahil-i jazirah-i sargardani, jashnnamah-i duktur Simin danishvar. "Collected Articles on Life and Works of Simin Daneshvar". Sokhan Publications. p. 1246. ISBN 978-9-643-72066-7.
- 2004 – The Memorial of Dr. Mehdi Semsar, edited by Ali Dehbashi, first edition, Ghatre Publications, Tehran
- 2004 – Bookshop (In the Memory of Babak Afshar) requested by Iraj Afshar (in collaboration with Abdolhossein Azarang, Ali Dehbashi, Seyed Farid Ghassemi, and Nader Motalebi Kashani) Shahab Sagheb Publications, Tehran
- 2004 – Research & Criticism of Goli Taraghi’s Works edited by Ali Dehbashi, Mehdi Karimi, first edition, Ghatre Publications, Tehran
- 2005 – In Memory of Bozorg Alavi edited by Ali Dehbashi, first edition, Sales Publications, Tehran
- 2005 – Knowing Taghi Modaressi edited by Ali Dehbashi and Mehdi Karimi, first edition, Ghatre Publications
- 2007 – Yade Yare Mehraban (In Memory of the Lind Friend), edited by Ali Dehbashi, Sedayeh Moaser, Tehran

- Dehbashi, Ali (2010). Shenakhtnameh Anna Akhmatova. Ketab Saray-e Nik. p. 742.
