= Everyday Life (song) =

2019 promotional single by Coldplay

Promotional single by Coldplay

from the album Everyday Life
- Released: 3 November 2019
- Genre: Art pop; art rock
- Length: 4:18
- Label: Parlophone; Atlantic
- Songwriters: Chris Martin; Guy Berryman; John Metcalfe; Jonny Buckland; Will Champion
- Producers: Bill Rahko; Daniel Green; Rik Simpson

Music video
- "Everyday Life" on YouTube

"Everyday Life" is a song by British rock band Coldplay from their eighth studio album of the same name. It was released on 3 November 2019 and sent to United Kingdom and Italy's contemporary hit radio as a promotional single in the following weeks. The track appears on the Sunset side of the album, being written by the band members and produced by The Dream Team.

== Music video ==
The music video premiered on South Africa's Soweto TV and then made available globally on YouTube on 9 December 2019. It was directed by Karena Evans and shot between South Africa, Morocco and Ukraine. The introduction is accompanied by a voiceover explaining the concept of "ubuntu" a Xhosa word which means "humanity" in direct translation: "basically, you’ll always need the next person. You know what I mean? So one hand washes the other, the one hand does need the other to clean. That is Ubuntu. To help others, your brothers, your sisters. Even when they are strangers and you don’t know them, you are supposed to help them".

== Live performances ==
The song's live premiere was held on the 2 November 2019 episode of NBC's Saturday Night Live, which was hosted by American actress Kristen Stewart. A second performance at the Annie Mac Show on BBC Radio 1 happened in on 27 November 2019.

== Critical reception ==
Rob Arcand of Spin magazine called the song a return to form, stating that "[i]t's a heartfelt return to the kind of lush balladry that the band built their reputation on, with gorgeous production and performance elements lending weight to the kind of broad, arena-rock universalisms present in the lyrics."

== Personnel ==
Credits adapted from Tidal.

Coldplay

- Guy Berryman – bass guitar
- Will Champion – drums, backing vocals
- Jonny Buckland – guitar
- Chris Martin – keyboards, vocals

Additional musicians

- Jacob Collier – backing vocals
- Marianna Champion – backing vocals
- Daniel Green – keyboards
- Rik Simpson – keyboards
- John Metcalfe – strings

Production

- Bill Rahko – producer
- Daniel Green – producer, programmer
- Rik Simpson – producer, programmer
- Jacob Collier – additional engineer
- Angel Lopez – additional production
- Frederico Vindver – additional production
- Emily Lazar – mastering
- Chris Allgood – assistant mastering
- Mark "Spike" Stent – mixing
- Matt Wolach – assistant mixing
- Michael Freeman – assistant mixing

== Charts ==
=== Weekly charts ===
Weekly chart performance
Chart (2019–2020)	Peak position
Australia Digital Tracks (ARIA)	38
Belgium (Ultratip Bubbling Under Flanders)	18
Hungary (Single Top 40)	28
Italy Airplay (EarOne)	13
Lithuania (AGATA)	98
Netherlands (Dutch Top 40)	25
Scottish Singles Sales (Official Charts)	54
Switzerland (Schweizer Hitparade)	43
UK Singles Downloads (Official Charts)	58
US Hot Rock & Alternative Songs (Billboard)	14

=== Year-end charts ===
Year-end chart performance
Chart (2020)	Position
Italy Airplay (EarOne)	73

== Certifications ==
Certifications
Region	Certification	Certified units/sales
Spain (Promusicae)	Gold	30,000^{‡}
^{‡} Sales+streaming figures based on certification alone.

== Release history ==
Release dates and formats
Region	Date	Format	Label	Ref.
Various	3 November 2019	Digital download · streaming	Parlophone	
Italy	17 January 2020	Contemporary hit radio	Warner	
