= Saadi Shirazi =

Persian poet (1210–c.1291)

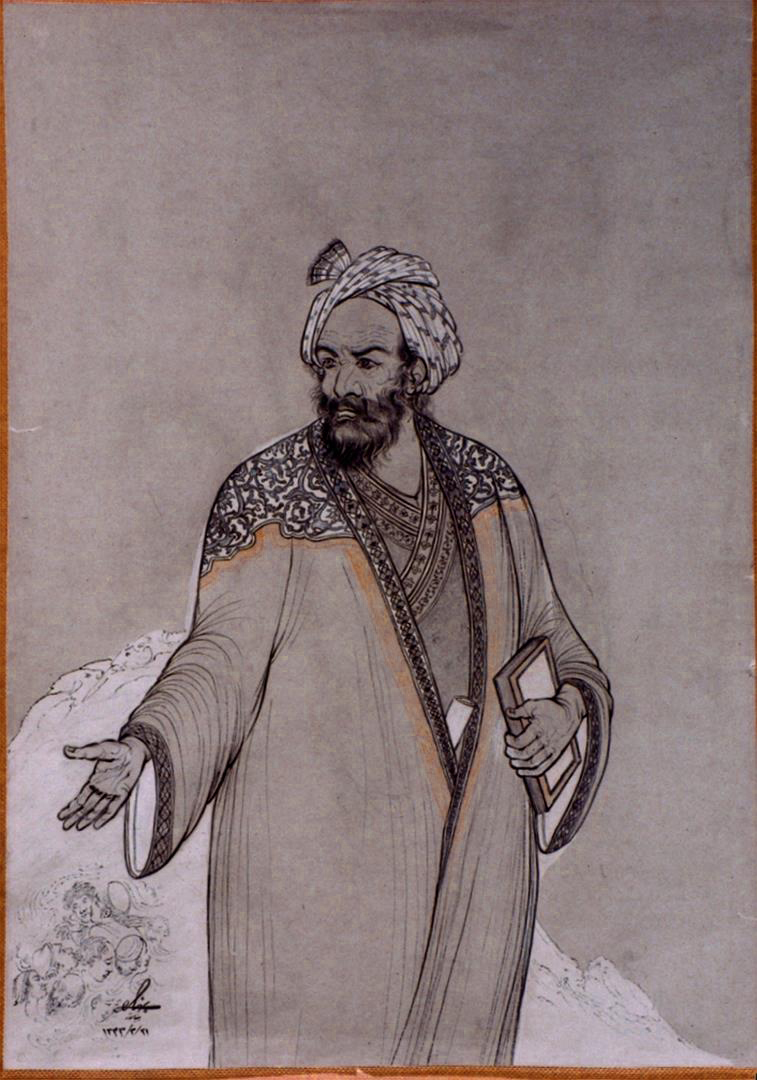
- Imaginary depiction of Saadi Shirazi by Hossein Behzad
- Born: Abu Mohammad Moshrefoldin Mosleh ebn Abdollah ebn Mosharraf; 1209/10; Shiraz, Fars, Salghurid kingdom
- Died: 1291/92; Shiraz, Fars, Ilkhanate
- Resting place: Tomb of Saadi, Shiraz
- Occupation: Poet
- Writing career
- Language: Persian; Arabic
- Notable works: Bustan; Gulistan

Abu Mohammad Moshrefoldin Mosleh ebn Abdollah ebn Mosharraf (Note: Persian: ابومحمّد مصلح‌الدین بن عبدالله شیرازی, romanized: Abū Muhammad Muslihuddīn bin Abdullâh Šêrâzī) (1209/10–1291/92), better known by his pen name Saadi, (Note: /ˈsɑːdi/; Persian: سعدی, romanized: Saʿdī, IPA: [sæʔˈdiː]; also known as سعدی شیرازی, Saʿdī Shīrāzī) was a Persian Sufi poet. He is recognized for the quality of his writings and for the depth of his social and moral thoughts.

Saadi is widely recognized as one of the greatest poets of the classical literary tradition, earning him the nickname "The Master of Speech" or "The Wordsmith" (استاد سخن ostâd-e soxan) or simply "Master" (استاد ostâd) among Persian scholars. He has been quoted in the Western traditions as well. His book, Bustan has been ranked as one of the 100 greatest books of all time by The Guardian.

== Background and name ==
Abu Mohammad Moshrefoldin Mosleh ebn Abdollah ebn Mosharraf, (Note: Persian: ابومحمّد مصلح‌الدین بن عبدالله شیرازی, romanized: Abū Muhammad Muslihuddīn bin Abdullâh Šêrâzī) was of Persian stock and his birth date is uncertain; most scholars consider him to have been born in 1209 or 1210. He was from the city of Shiraz, the provincial capital of the modern day Fars province. Since 1148, the city had been under the rule of the Salghurids, a Persianate dynasty of Turkoman origin.

There is little certainty concerning Saadi's life. Although his own writings, particularly the Bustan and Gulistan, contain many supposedly autobiographical memories, many of these are historically unlikely and are likely made up or cast in the first person for rhetorical effect. Even the earliest references to him in external literature differ in crucial details. Even his real name is uncertain. In sources, his entire name—which consists of his given name, honorific (laqab), agnomen (kunya), and patronymic—is spelled in several differing ways.

The oldest known source to mention his full name is the Talḵiṣ al-majmaʿ al-ādāb fi moʿjam al-alqāb ("Summary of the gathering of refinements concerning the lexicon of honorifics") by Ibn al-Fuwati (died 1323). In a letter dated 1262, he asked Saadi for samples of his Arabic poetry and mentioned his full name as "Muslih al-Din Abu Muhammad Abd-Allah ibn Musharrif." The Iranian scholar Saeed Nafisi favoured this version of his full name. However, the majority of other academics favour the information found in the early manuscripts of Saadi's writings. For instance, the British Iranologist Edward Granville Browne used a text from 1328 to argue that Saadi's full name was "Musharrif al-Din ibn Muslih al-Din Abd-Allah." The majority of subsequent Western academics, including Arthur John Arberry, Jan Rypka, and R. Davis, include "Abd-Allah" in Saadi's patronymic, hence "Abu Abd-Allah Musharrif al-Din Muslih".

The Iranian scholar Zabihollah Safa came to the conclusion that "Muslih" was Saadi's given name and gives his full name as "Abu Muhammad Musharrif al-Din Muslih ibn Abd-Allah ibn Musharrif" based on the preface to one of the oldest surviving compilations of Saadi's collected works, which was created by his fellow townsman Ali ibn Ahmad ibn Abu Bakr Bisotun in 1326. In his book Nafahat al-Uns, the Persian poet Jami (died 1492) provides virtually the same version of the name. This version is also supported by the Iranologist Paul E. Losensky.

His pen name "Saadi" is unambiguous as it appears frequently in his work and acts as his signature in all of his ghazals (amatory poem or ode). However, there are doubts over where it came from. Since two members of the Salghurid dynasty named "Sa'd" ruled for most of Saadi's life, it is likely that the inspiration for the name came from his allegiance to them. The Iranian scholar Abdolhossein Zarrinkoob argues that "Sa'd" or "Banu Sa'd" was also the name of the dynasty itself, hence Saadi's adoption of the name, which demonstrated his loyalty to them.

== Biography ==
=== Education and travels ===
Saadi appears to have received his early education from his father, who also instilled in him lifelong tolerance values. During Saadi's adolescence, his father died, thus leaving him an orphan. Probably around 1223/24, when Sa'd I was briefly deposed by Ghiyath al-Din Pirshah, Saadi, still a teenager, left for Baghdad to continue his education there.

The Iranian scholar Badiozzaman Forouzanfar has found notable parallels between Saadi's teachings and those of Sufi master Shihab al-Din Yahya ibn Habash Suhrawardi, suggesting that they were possibly associated. After completing his studies, Saadi spent a considerable amount of time traveling across the Islamic world. According to first-hand reports, he killed a temple priest in India and was captured by the Crusaders in Syria. According to Losensky; "Despite efforts of scholars such as H. Massé and J. A. Boyle, the effort to re-create an exact itinerary of his travels from his works is misguided." The Iranologist Homa Katouzian examined the data and came to the conclusion that while Saadi was probably in Iraq, Syria, Palestine, and the Arabian Peninsula, it was unlikely that he ever made it as far east as Khorasan, India, or Kashgar.

=== Return to Shiraz ===
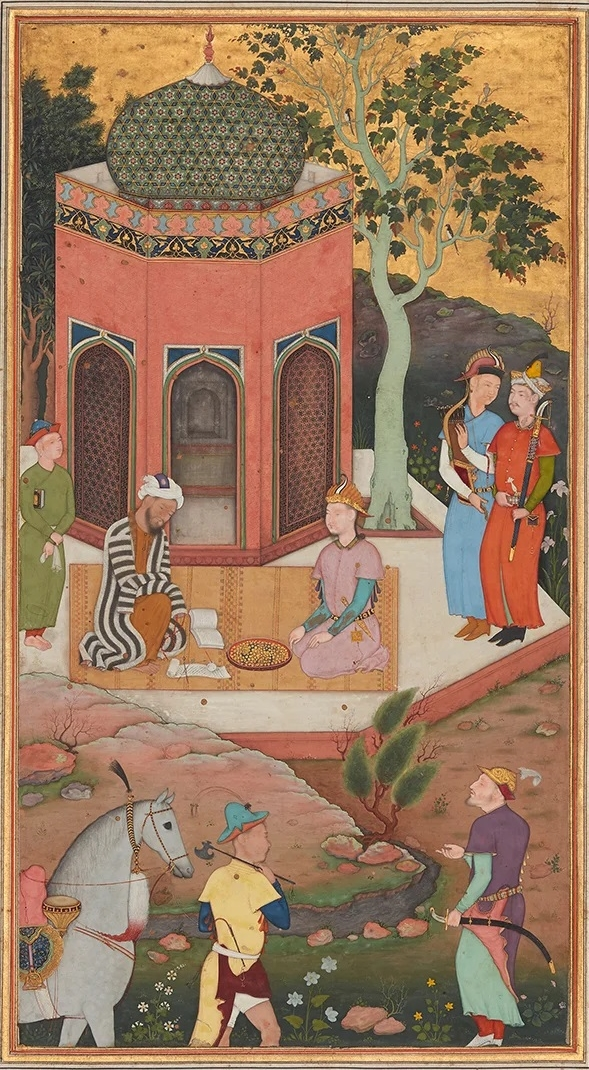
Folio depicting Saadi Shirazi (seated left) and the Salghurid ruler Abu Bakr ibn Sa'd (seated right). Made in Mughal India, dated 1602

After nearly 30 years of travel, Saadi returned to Shiraz in 1257, and it appears that he was already well-known and well-respected as a poet. This reputation must have come from the widespread publication of his ghazals. He was keen to restore his connections to the Salghurid dynasty, as evidenced by the speed with which the Bustan and Gulistan were published and their dedications. In a short ode, Saadi says he was inspired to go back to Shiraz by the establishment of peace and prosperity established by the Salghurid ruler Abu Bakr ibn Sa'd (r. 1226–1260). However, the Salghurid kingdom did not last long after Saadi came back. In 1256/57, Abu Bakr acknowledged the Mongol Empire as his suzerain. Abu Bakr died in 1260, and was succeeded by his eldest son Sa'd II, who died 12 days later. Their death is the subject of various elegies by Saadi. The ruler after this was Sa'd II's 12-year old son Muhammad I ibn Sa'd, who ruled under the supervision of his mother Tarkhan Khatun. Saadi praises both of them in his poems.

The Salghurid dynasty crumbled apart fast due to progressively escalating pressure by the Mongol Empire. Following Muhammad I's death, two of Abu Bakr's nephews were installed on the Salghurid throne. Saadi composed three poems honoring the second of them, Saljuk Shah ibn Salghur, during his brief five-month reign in 1263. Following an impulsive and alcohol-influenced uprising by Saljuk Shah ibn Salghur, the Mongols killed him, formally handing over power to Abish Khatun, Sa'd II's youngest daughter. However, Shiraz was effectively incorporated under Mongol rule through her forced marriage to Möngke Temür, the son of the ruler of the Mongol Ilkhanate, Hulagu Khan (r. 1256–1265). One of Saadis poems was most likely dedicated to Abish Khatun.

Saadi did not seem to have supported the rise of the Mongol Empire. He composed two qasidas (odes)—one in Arabic and the other in Persian—which grieved over the collapse of the Abbasid caliphate and the death of the last caliph al-Musta'sim (r. 1242–1258) in 1258 during the Mongol attack on Baghdad. In spite of this, Saadi composed a poem in honor of the transition of authority from the Salghurids to the Mongols, and his writings include a number of poems with similar dedications to both the Mongol rulers and their Persian administrators.

Amir Ankyanu, one of the most prominent of these, was the governor of Shiraz from 1268 to 1272. Saadi wrote four qasidas and the prose treatise Dar tarbiat-e yaki az moluk to him. According to Losensky; "None of these works can be considered panegyrics in the usual sense of the word, since they consist mostly of counsel and warnings concerning the proper conduct of rulers." The poems Saadi wrote to Shams al-Din Husayn Alakani, the longtime chief of the chancery in Shiraz, are less cautionary in tone. Shams al-Din Juvayni, the principal finance minister of the Ilkhanate, had assigned him to this position. Along with his brother Ata-Malik Juvayni, the author of Tarikh-i Jahangushay, Shams al-Din Juvayni is honored in some of the most prominent ghazals by Saadi. Saadi's encounter with the two Juvayni brothers and the Ilkhanate ruler Abaqa (r. 1265–1282) at Tabriz, which took place on his way back from a pilgrimage to Mecca, is the subject of two treatises that are frequently found in his collected works (although they were not written by him). A collection of qit'a (monorhyme poetry) poems named the Sahebiya in honor of Shams al-Din Juvayni is also present in a few of Saadi's earlier writings.

=== Death and burial place ===
A brief qasida to Majd-al-Din Rumi—who worked as an administrative officer in Shiraz under the Ilkhanate ruler Arghun (r. 1284–1291) between 1287 and 1289—is seemingly the last dateable poetry by Saadi. A few years later, Saadi died in Shiraz. 1291–1299 are the dates of death given by early sources. Nafisi came to the conclusion that Saadi died on 9 December 1292 after carefully examining the available data. Safa, drawing from the Tarikh-i guzida written in 1330 by Hamdallah Mustawfi—which is the earliest surviving reliable narrative—as well as other sources from the 14th century, concludes that Saadi died a year earlier, between 25 November and 22 December 1291. The benefit of this earlier date is that it helps explain why chronicles differ on the death date of Saadi. Because Saadi died in the last month of the year, commemorative chronicles may had honored the year of his death or the year after, at the end of the 40-day mourning period. Losensky therefore puts his death date as either 1291 or 1292.

The German cartographer and explorer Carsten Niebuhr visited the tomb of Saadi in 1765, writing that "This building is very dilapidated, and will likely collapse unless some rich Mohammedan takes pity on it and has it repaired." A few years later, the Zand ruler Karim Khan Zand (r. 1751–1779) ordered renovations to the tomb; he had an iron railing created around the gravestone and a brick and plaster structure created over the grave.

== Works ==
=== Bustan and Gulistan ===
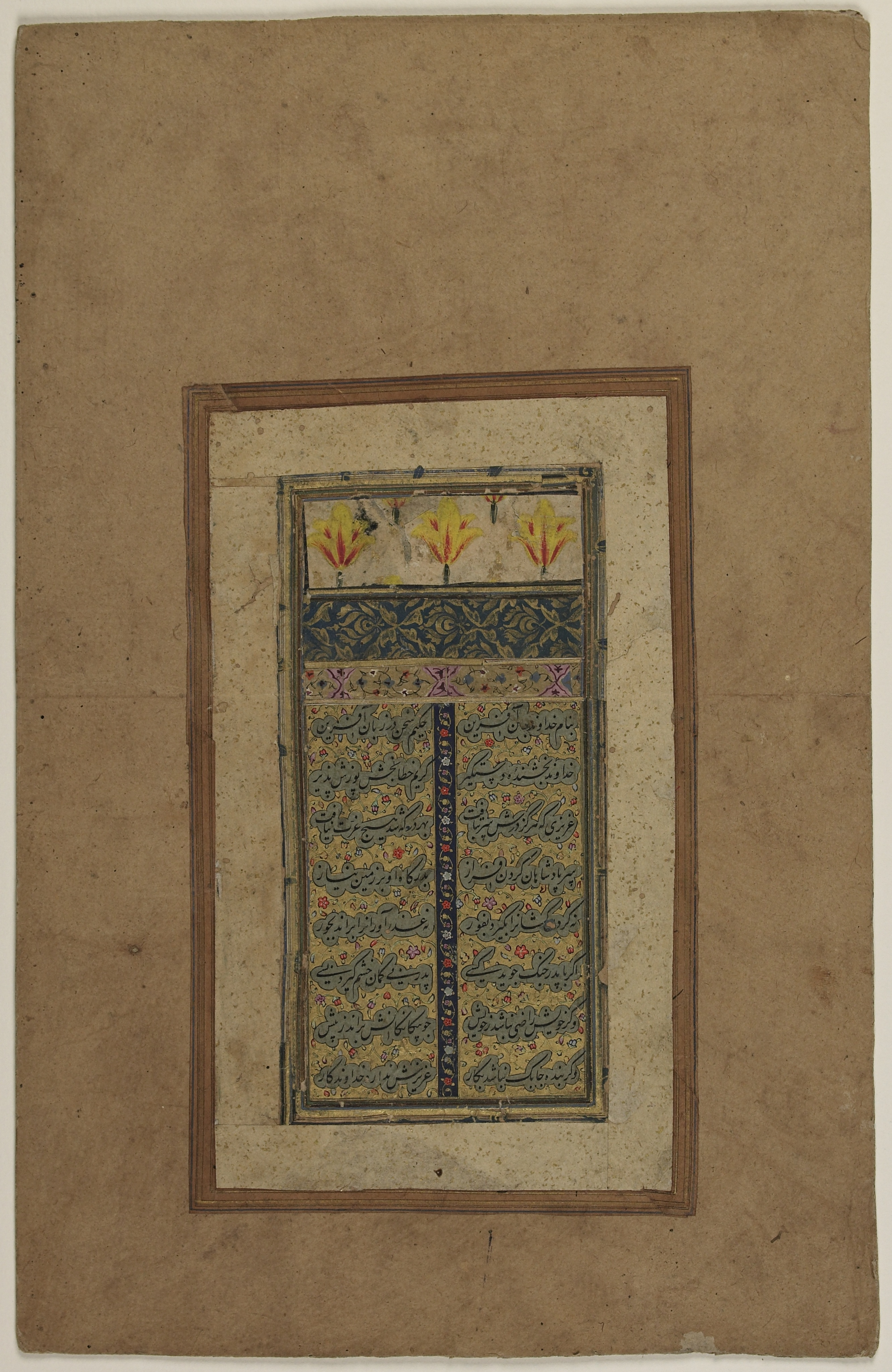
The first page of Bustan, from a Mughal manuscript.

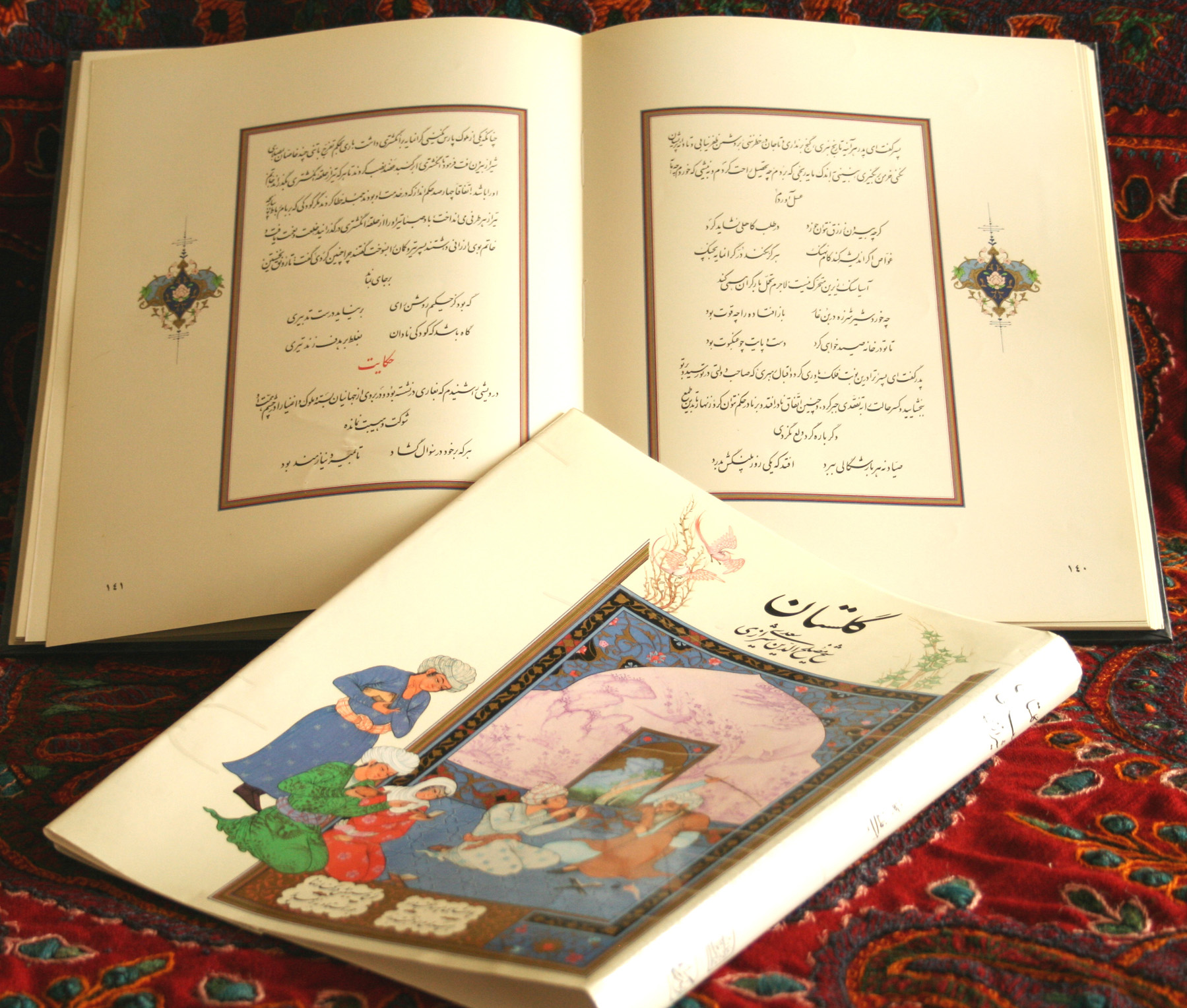
Gulistan Saadi (Calligraphy of Golestan Saadi in Nastaliq script)

Sa'di's best known works are Bustan (The Orchard) completed in 1257 and Gulistan (The Rose Garden) completed in 1258. Bustan is entirely in verse (epic metre). It consists of stories aptly illustrating the standard virtues recommended to Muslims (justice, liberality, modesty, contentment) and reflections on the behavior of dervishes and their ecstatic practices. Gulistan is mainly in prose and contains stories and personal anecdotes. The text is interspersed with a variety of short poems which contain aphorisms, advice, and humorous reflections, demonstrating Saadi's profound awareness of the absurdity of human existence. The fate of those who depend on the changeable moods of kings is contrasted with the freedom of the dervishes.

Regarding the importance of professions Saadi writes:

O darlings of your fathers, learn the trade because property and riches of the world are not to be relied upon; also silver and gold are an occasion of danger because either a thief may steal them at once or the owner spend them gradually; but a profession is a living fountain and permanent wealth; and although a professional man may lose riches, it does not matter because a profession is itself wealth and wherever you go you will enjoy respect and sit on high places, whereas those who have no trade will glean crumbs and see hardships.

Saadi is also remembered as a panegyrist and lyricist, the author of a number of odes portraying human experience, and also of particular odes such as the lament on the fall of Baghdad after the Mongol invasion in 1258. His lyrics are found in Ghazaliyat (Lyrics) and his odes in Qasa'id (Odes). He is also known for a number of works in Arabic.

In the Bustan, Saadi writes of a man who relates his time in battle with the Mongols:

In Isfahan I had a friend who was warlike, spirited, and shrewd....after long I met him: "O tiger-seizer!" I exclaimed, "what has made thee decrepit like an old fox?"

He laughed and said: "Since the days of war against the Mongols, I have expelled the thoughts of fighting from my head. Then did I see the earth arrayed with spears like a forest of reeds. I raised like smoke the dust of conflict; but when Fortune does not favour, of what avail is fury? I am one who, in combat, could take with a spear a ring from the palm of the hand; but, as my star did not befriend me, they encircled me as with a ring. I seized the opportunity of flight, for only a fool strives with Fate. How could my helmet and cuirass aid me when my bright star favoured me not? When the key of victory is not in the hand, no one can break open the door of conquest with his arms.

The enemy were a pack of leopards, and as strong as elephants. The heads of the heroes were encased in iron, as were also the hoofs of the horses. We urged on our Arab steeds like a cloud, and when the two armies encountered each other thou wouldst have said they had struck the sky down to the earth. From the raining of arrows, that descended like hail, the storm of death arose in every corner. Not one of our troops came out of the battle but his cuirass was soaked with blood. Not that our swords were blunt—it was the vengeance of stars of ill fortune. Overpowered, we surrendered, like a fish which, though protected by scales, is caught by the hook in the bait. Since Fortune averted her face, useless was our shield against the arrows of Fate.

=== Ghazals ===
The Ghazals of Saadi are a collection of poems written by Saadi in the form of ghazal, and several critical editions of these poems have been published by scholars of Persian language and literature. Saadi composed about 700 ghazals. Saadi paid special attention to the language of Sanai and Anvari in the composition of his ghazals. Many experts believe that the ghazal form reached its peak in the poetry of Saadi and Hafez.

The central theme of most of Saadi's ghazals is love. Saadi is one of the few poets whose romantic ghazals remain focused on love from beginning to end. His romantic ghazals are known for their simplicity, purity, and earthiness. Saadi also paid special attention to circular meters (musical rhythms such as "fa’alātun fā’ilātun fa’alātun fā’ilātun" or "mufta’ilun mafā’ilun mufta’ilun mafā’ilun") in the composition of his ghazals.

In addition to romantic ghazals, Saadi also composed mystical and didactic ghazals. In editing Saadi's collected works, Foroughi separated the mystical and didactic ghazals from the others and placed them in a separate chapter titled "Admonitions".

Saadi's ghazals are collected in four books: Tayyibat, Bada’i, Khawatim, and Ghazaliyat-e Qadim. The Ghazaliyat-e Qadim were composed by Saadi during his youth and are filled with passion and enthusiasm. Khawatim are related to Saadi's old age and include themes of asceticism, mysticism, and morality. Bada’i and Tayyibat belong to his middle age, reflecting both the passion of youth and the asceticism and mysticism of old age. Artistically, Tayyibat and Bada’i are superior to the other two sections. In some editions of Saadi's collected works, the multilingual ghazals (ghazals written in both Persian and Arabic) are placed in a separate section titled "Multilingual Ghazals," which, according to Mohammad Ali Foroughi, is a false division since it does not appear in older manuscripts.

Works in Arabic

Saadi does not have an independent work in Arabic. However, some of his poems have been composed in Arabic. These poems consist of several qasidas (odes), qit'a, and single verses. In 2011, a collection of Saadi’s Arabic works was compiled in a book titled Saadi's Arabic Poems, published by the Saadi Studies Center, along with their Persian translations. According to the orientalist Edward Browne, Saadi’s Arabic poems are average quality. Musa Anwar, comparing these poems to those of Arabic-speaking poets of Saadi’s time, believes that they hold a respectable position and are valuable in terms of content and structure. He also notes that there are some grammatical errors in Saadi's Arabic poems.

=== Other works ===
Saadi wrote four books of love poems (ghazals), and number of longer mono-rhyme poems (qasidas) in both Persian and Arabic. There are also quatrains and short pieces, and some lesser works in prose and poetry. Together with Rumi and Hafez, he is considered one of the three greatest ghazal-writers of Persian poetry.

=== Bani Adam ===
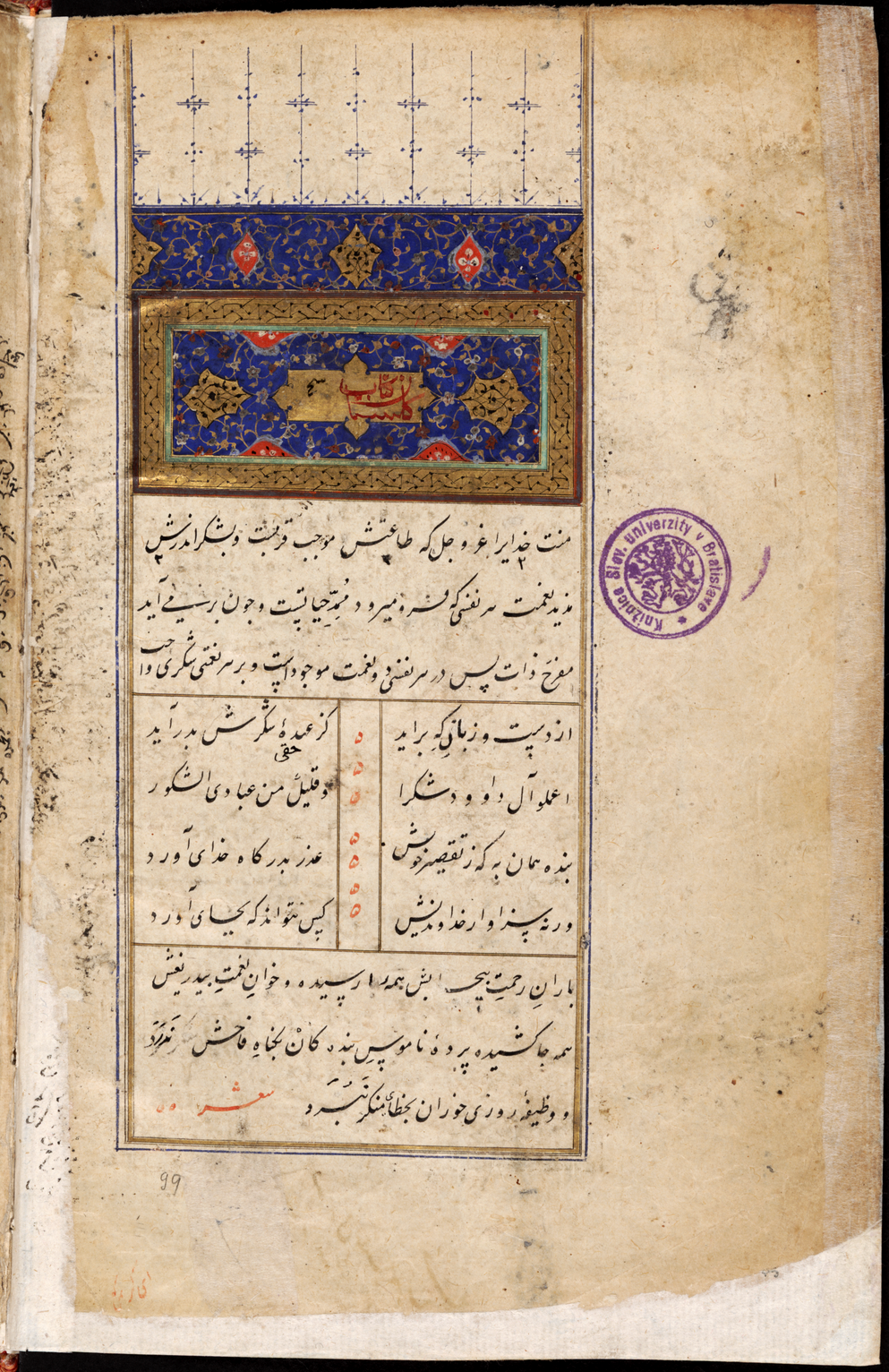
A copy of Saadi Shirazi's works by the Bosniak scholar Safvet beg Bašagić (1870–1934)

Saadi is well known for his aphorisms, the most famous of which, Bani Adam, is part of the Gulistan. In a delicate way it calls for breaking down all barriers between human beings:

The original Persian text is as follows:

بنى آدم اعضای یک پیکرند
که در آفرینش ز یک گوهرند
چو عضوى بدرد آورَد روزگار
دگر عضوها را نمانَد قرار
تو کز محنت دیگران بی غمی
نشاید که نامت نهند آدمی

banī ādam a'zā-ye yekpeikar-and
ke dar āfarīn-aš ze yek gowhar-and
čo 'ozvī be dard āvarad rūzgār
degar 'ozvhā-rā na-mānad qarār
to k-az mehnat-ē dīgarān bīqam-ī
na-šāyad ke nām-at nahand ādamī

The literal translation of the above is as follows:

"The children of Adam are the members of one body,
who are in their creation from the same essence.
if one member is injured ,
other members will also feel pain
If you are unsympathetic to the misery of others,
it is not right that they should call you a human being."

The above version with yekdīgar "one another" is the usual one quoted in Iran (for example, in the well-known edition of Mohammad Ali Foroughi, on the carpet installed in the United Nations building in New York in 2005, on the Iranian (500 rials) coin since 1387 Solar Hijri calendar (i.e. in 2008), and on the back of the 100,000-rial banknote issued in 2010); according to the scholar Habib Yaghmai is also the only version found in the earliest manuscripts, which date to within 50 years of the writing of the Golestan. Some books, however, print a variation banī ādam a'zā-ye yek peykar-and ("The sons of Adam are members of one body"), and this version, which accords more closely with the hadith quoted below, is followed by most English translations.

The following translation is by H. Vahid Dastjerdi:

Adam's sons are body limbs, to say;
For they're created of the same clay.
Should one organ be troubled by pain,
Others would suffer severe strain.
Thou, careless of people's suffering,
Deserve not the name, "human being".

This is a verse translation by Ali Salami:

Human beings are limbs of one body indeed;
For, they're created of the same soul and seed.
When one limb is afflicted with pain,
Other limbs will feel the bane.
He who has no sympathy for human suffering,
Is not worthy of being called a human being.

And by Richard Jeffrey Newman:

All men and women are to each other
the limbs of a single body, each of us drawn
from life's shimmering essence, God's perfect pearl;
and when this life we share wounds one of us,
all share the hurt as if it were our own.
You, who will not feel another's pain,
you forfeit the right to be called human.

United Nations Secretary-General Ban Ki-moon said in Tehran: "At the entrance of the United Nations there is a magnificent carpet – I think the largest carpet the United Nations has – that adorns the wall of the United Nations, a gift from the people of Iran. Alongside it are the wonderful words of that great Persian poet, Sa’adi":

All human beings are members of one frame,
Since all, at first, from the same essence came.
When time afflicts a limb with pain
The other limbs at rest cannot remain.
If thou feel not for other's misery
A human being is no name for thee.

According to the former Iranian Foreign Minister and Envoy to the United Nations, Mohammad Ali Zarif, this carpet, installed in 2005, actually hangs not in the entrance but in a meeting room inside the United Nations building in New York.

Bani Adam was used by the British rock band Coldplay in their song بنی آدم, with the title Bani Adam written in Persian script. The song is featured on their 2019 album Everyday Life.

This version was delivered by Bowinn Ma, Minister of State for Infrastructure, British Columbia, Canada, in the BC Parliament.

Human beings are members of a whole
In creation, of one essence and soul
If one member is inflicted with pain
Other members, uneasy will remain
If you have no sympathy for human pain
The name of human you cannot retain.

== Legacy and poetic style ==
Inscription of Ibrahim Sultan, a Timurid prince, at the Tachara Palace in Persepolis, dated to 826 AH (1422–1423 CE), featuring verses from Saadi’s Bustan.

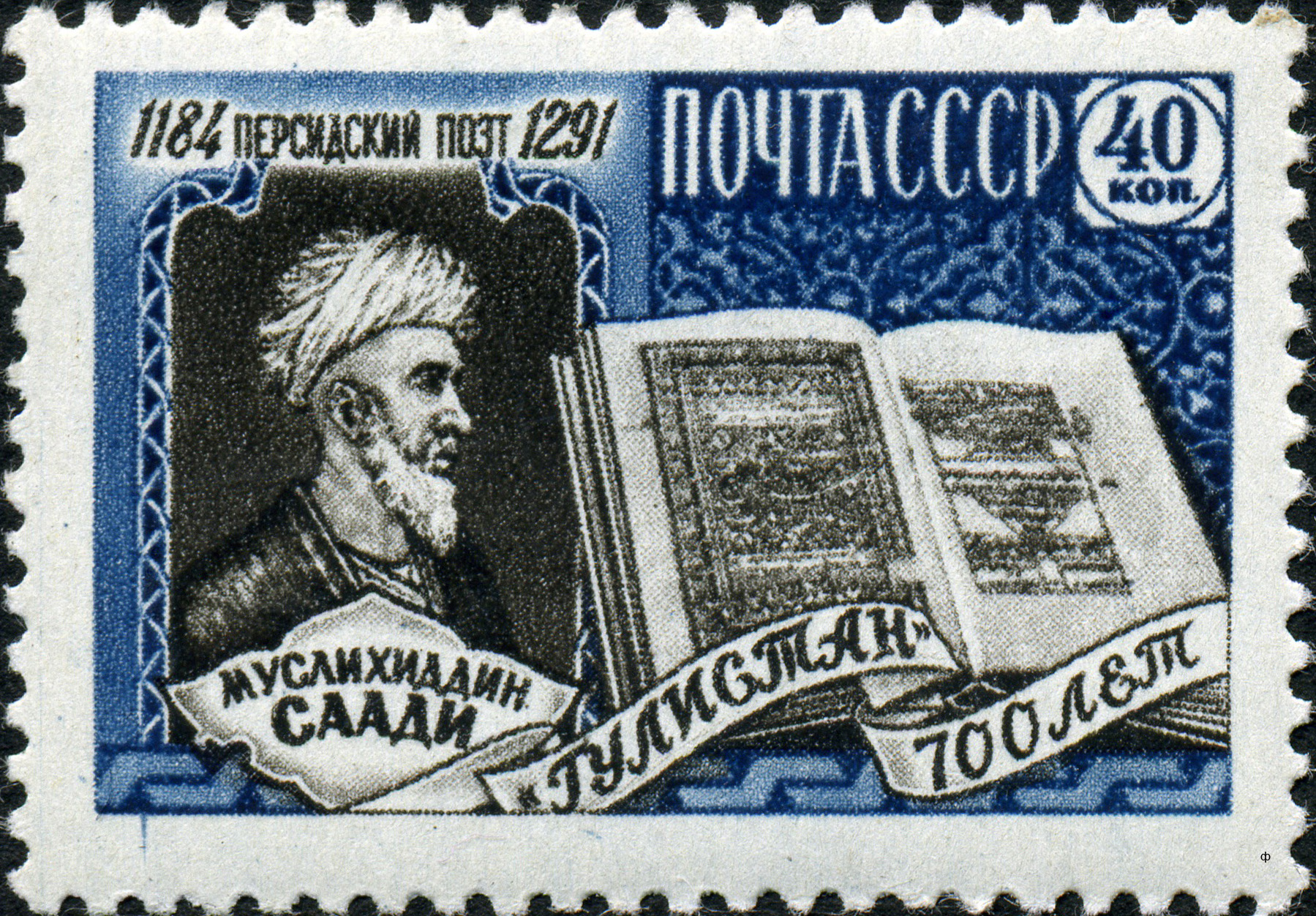
Soviet Union stamp for 700th anniversary of writing Gulistan

Saadi distinguished between the spiritual and the practical or mundane aspects of life. In his Bustan, for example, spiritual Saadi uses the mundane world as a spring board to propel himself beyond the earthly realms. The images in Bustan are delicate in nature and soothing. In the Gulistan, on the other hand, mundane Saadi lowers the spiritual to touch the heart of his fellow wayfarers. Here the images are graphic and, thanks to Saadi's dexterity, remain concrete in the reader's mind. Realistically, too, there is a ring of truth in the division. The Sheikh preaching in the Khanqah experiences a totally different world than the merchant passing through a town. The unique thing about Saadi is that he embodies both the Sufi Sheikh and the travelling merchant. They are, as he himself puts it, two almond kernels in the same shell.

Saadi's prose style, described as "simple but impossible to imitate" flows quite naturally and effortlessly. Its simplicity, however, is grounded in a semantic web consisting of synonymy, homophony, and oxymoron buttressed by internal rhythm and external rhyme.

Chief among works influenced by Saadi is Goethe's West-Oestlicher Divan. Andre du Ryer was the first European to present Saadi to the West, by means of a partial French translation of Gulistan in 1634. Adam Olearius followed soon with a complete translation of the Bustan and the Gulistan into German in 1654.

In his Lectures on Aesthetics, Hegel wrote (on the Arts translated by Henry Paolucci, 2001, p. 155–157):

Pantheistic poetry has had, it must be said, a higher and freer development in the Islamic world, especially among the Persians ... The full flowering of Persian poetry comes at the height of its complete transformation in speech and national character, through Mohammedanism ... In later times, poetry of this order [Ferdowsi's epic poetry] had a sequel in love epics of extraordinary tenderness and sweetness; but there followed also a turn toward the didactic, where, with a rich experience of life, the far-traveled Saadi was master before it submerged itself in the depths of the pantheistic mysticism taught and recommended in the extraordinary tales and legendary narrations of the great Jalal-ed-Din Rumi.

Alexander Pushkin, one of Russia's most celebrated poets, quotes Saadi in his work Eugene Onegin, "as Saadi sang in earlier ages, 'some are far distant, some are dead'." Gulistan was an influence on the fables of Jean de La Fontaine. Benjamin Franklin in one of his works, DLXXXVIII A Parable on Persecution, quotes one of Saadi's parables from Bustan, apparently without knowing the source. Ralph Waldo Emerson was also interested in Saadi's writings, contributing to some translated editions himself. Emerson, who read Saadi only in translation, compared his writing to the Bible in terms of its wisdom and the beauty of its narrative.

The French physicist Nicolas Léonard Sadi Carnot's third given name is from Saadi's name. It was chosen by his father, Lazare Carnot, because of his great interest in Saadi and his poems.

Voltaire was thrilled with his works, especially Gulistan; he enjoyed being called "Saadi" as a nickname among his friends.

U.S. President Barack Obama quoted the first two lines of this poem in his New Year's greeting to the people of Iran on March 20, 2009, "But let us remember the words that were written by the poet Saadi, so many years ago: 'The children of Adam are limbs to each other, having been created of one essence.'"

In 1976, a crater on Mercury was named in his honor.

== National commemoration of 'Saadi Day' ==
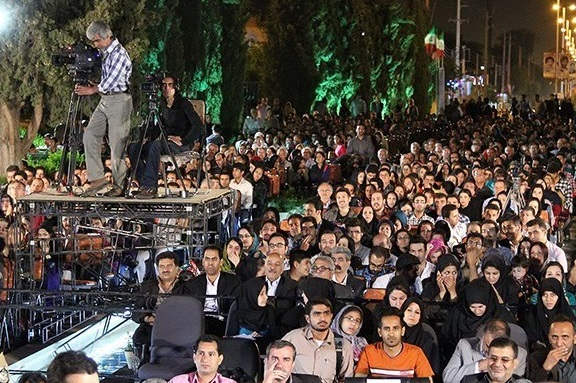
Saadi Shirazi's commemoration day

Annually on 21 April (20 April in leap years), a crowd of foreign tourists and Iranians gather at Saadi's tomb in order to mark the day.

This commemoration day is held on the 1st of Ordibehesht, the second month of the Solar Hijri calendar (see Iranian calendar), the day on which Saadi states that he finished Gulistan in 1256.

== Mausoleum ==
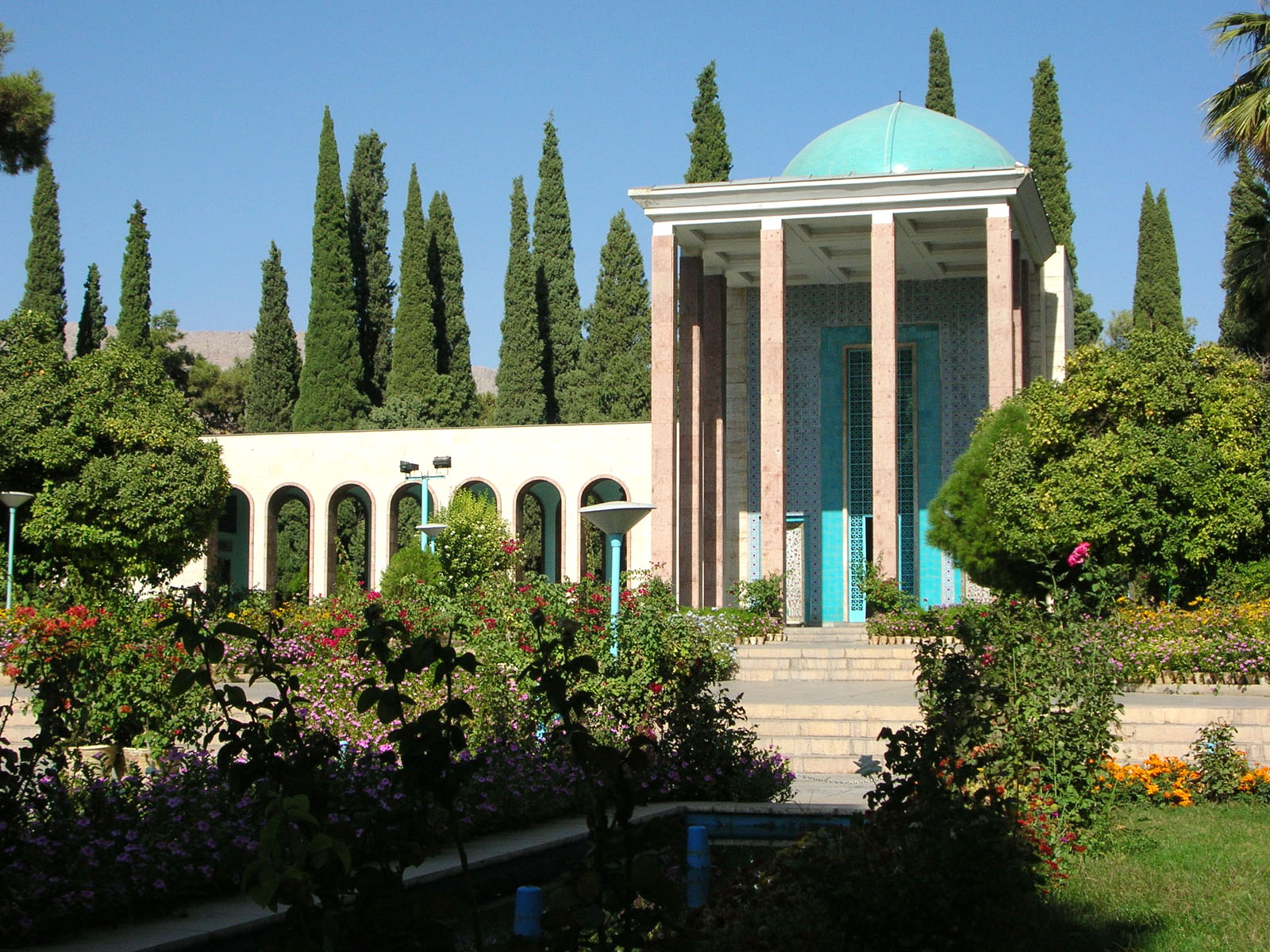
Saadi's mausoleum in Shiraz, Iran

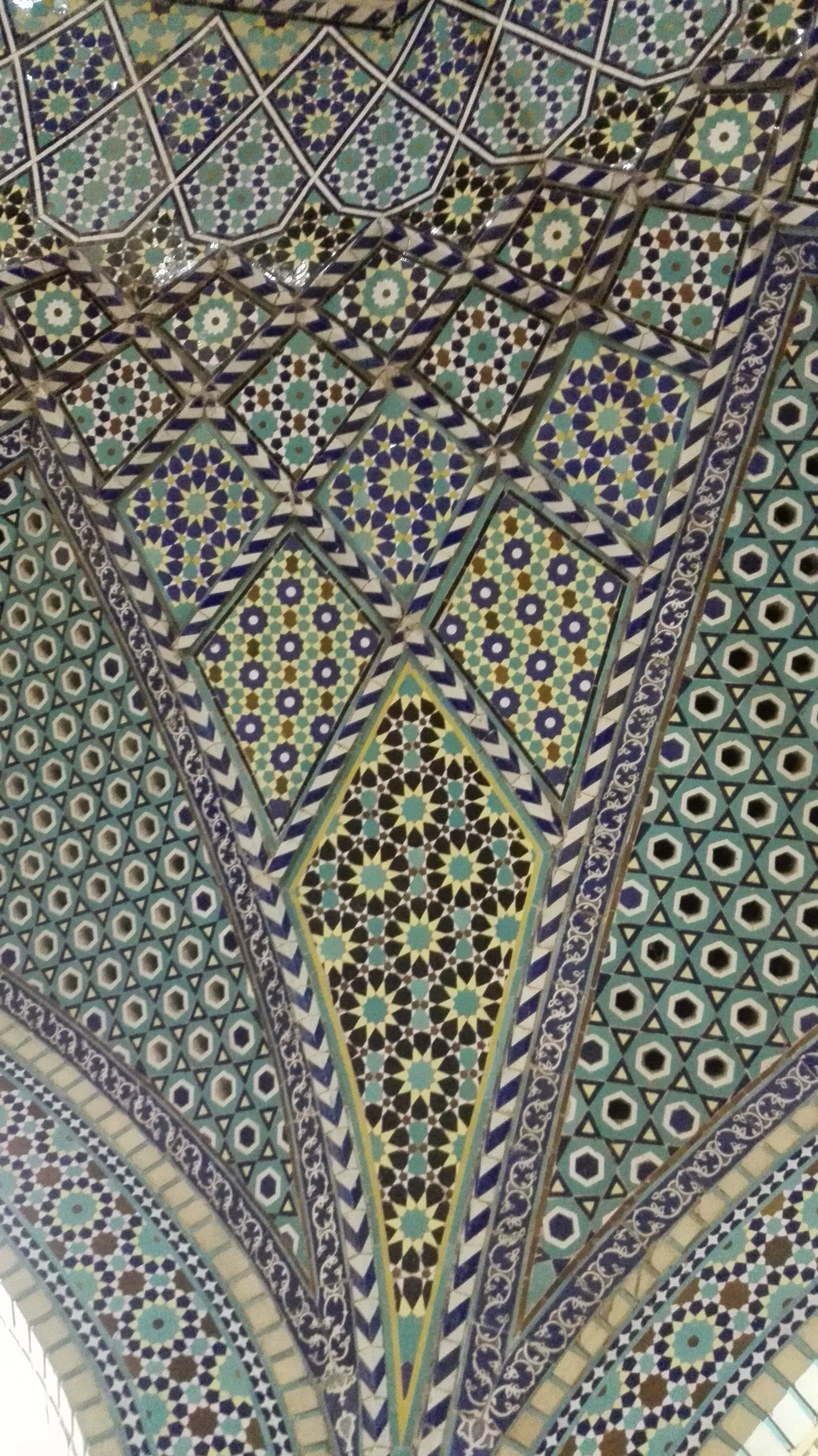
Mosaic in his mausoleum

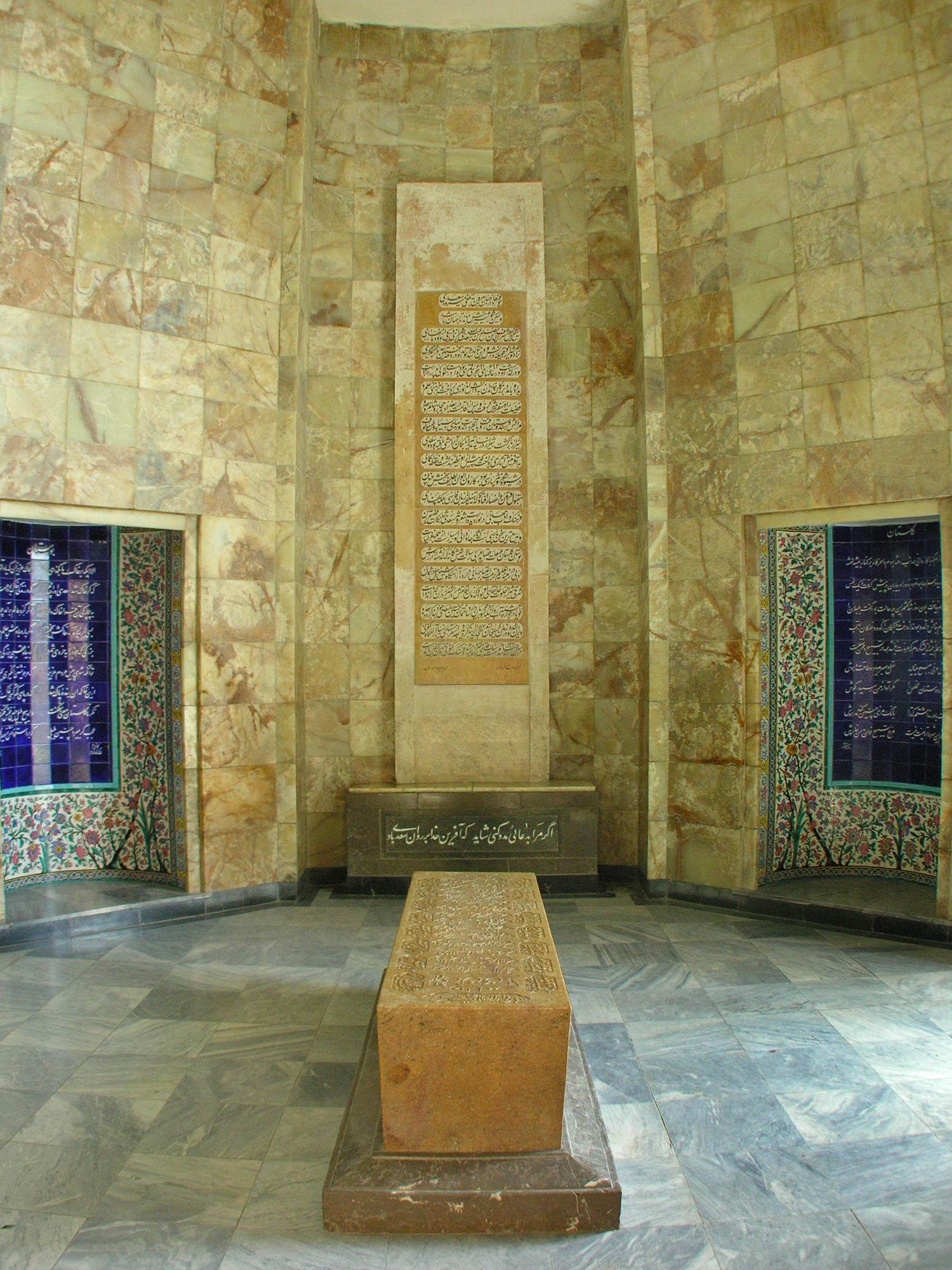
Tomb of Saadi in his mausoleum

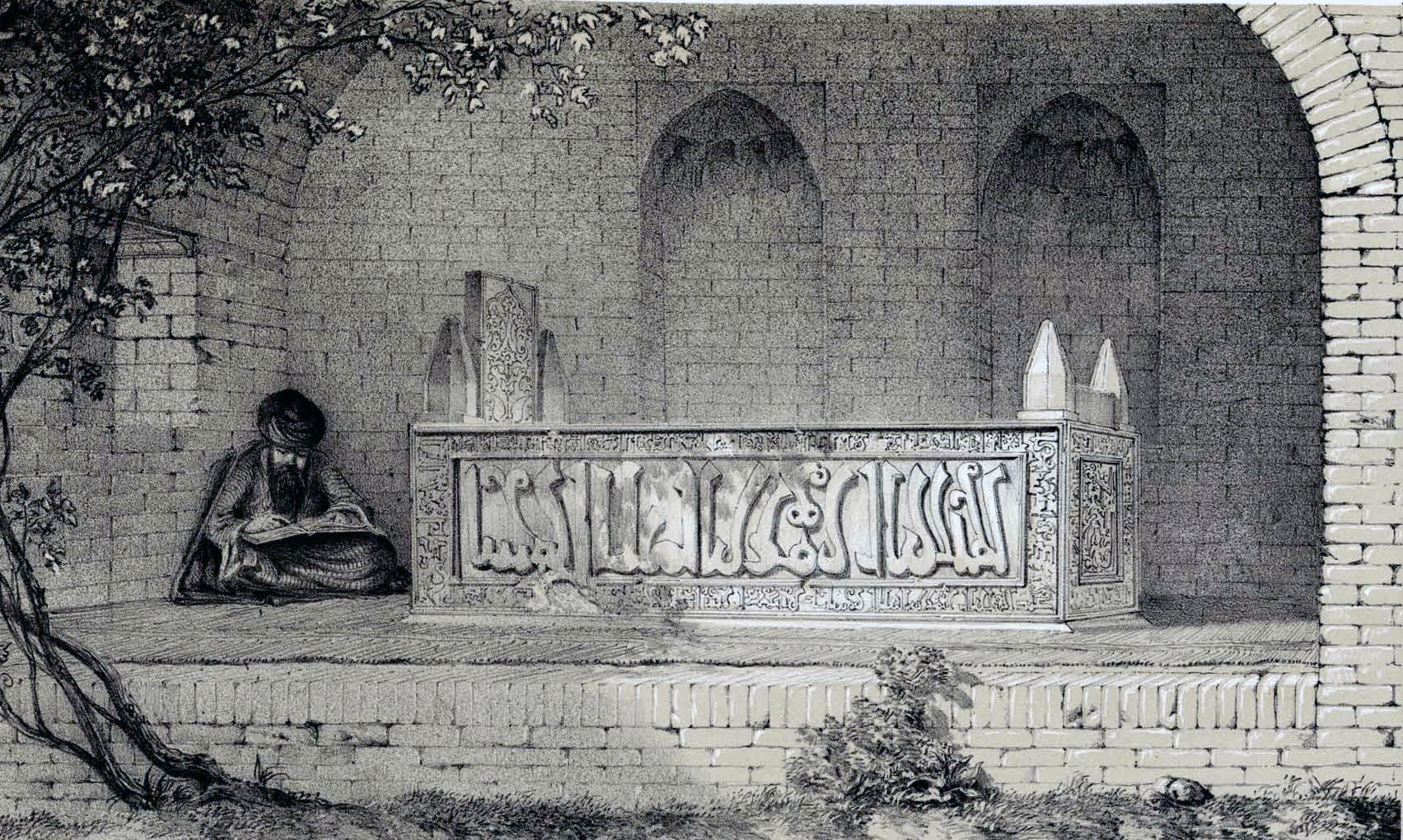
Tomb of Sheikh Saadi by Eugène Flandin, 1851

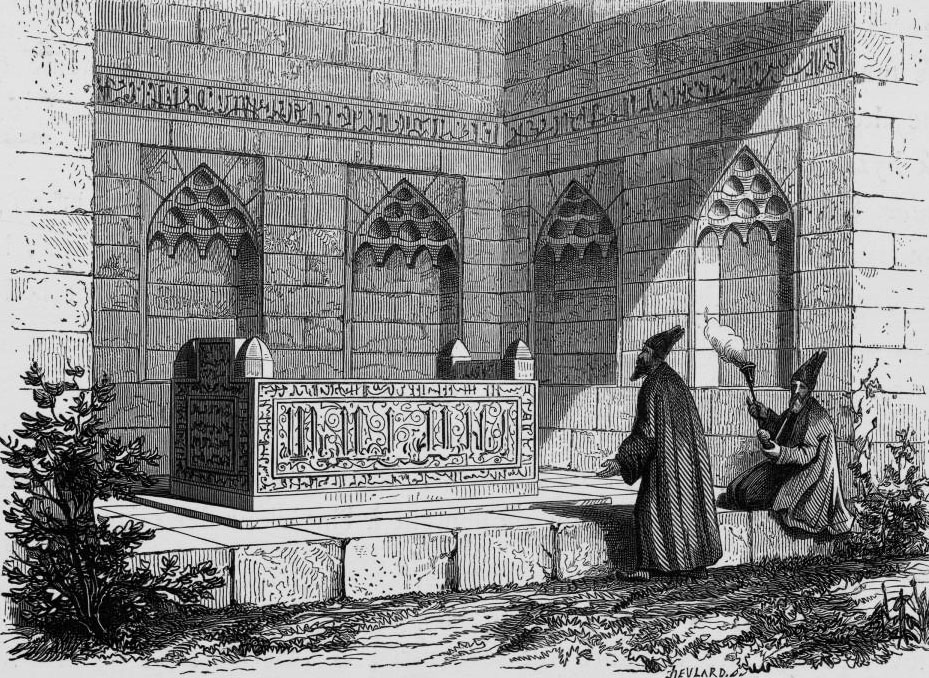
Tomb of Saadi by Pascal Coste, 1867

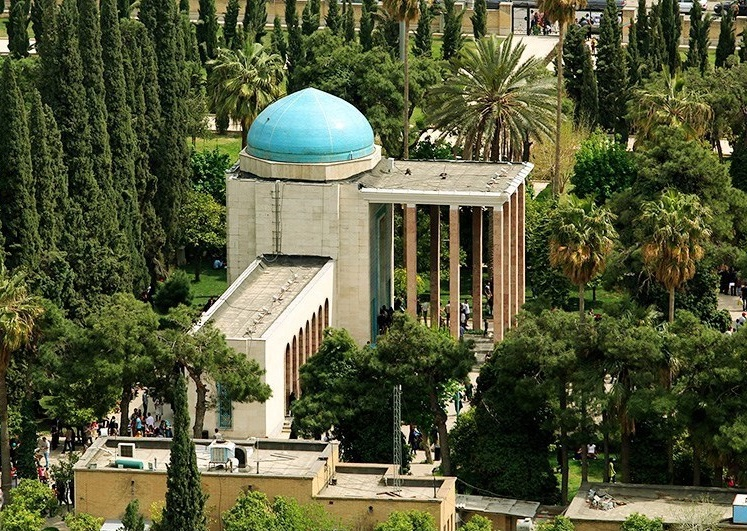
Tomb of Saadi from sky, 20 April 2014

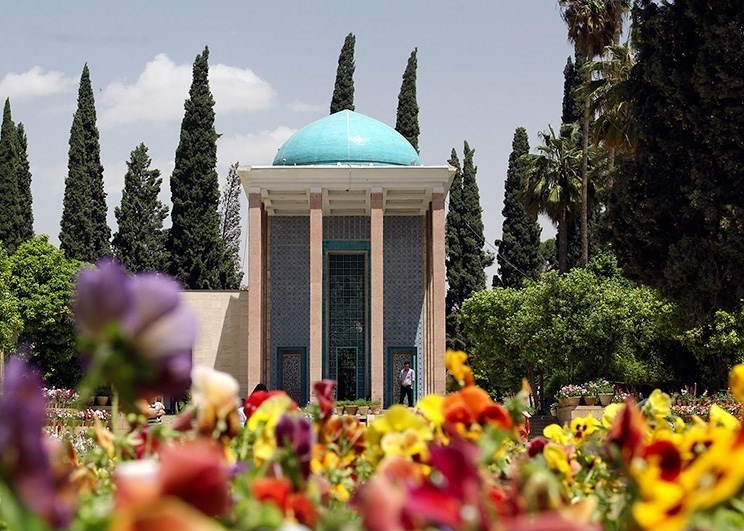
Tomb of Saadi's entrance, 20 April 2014

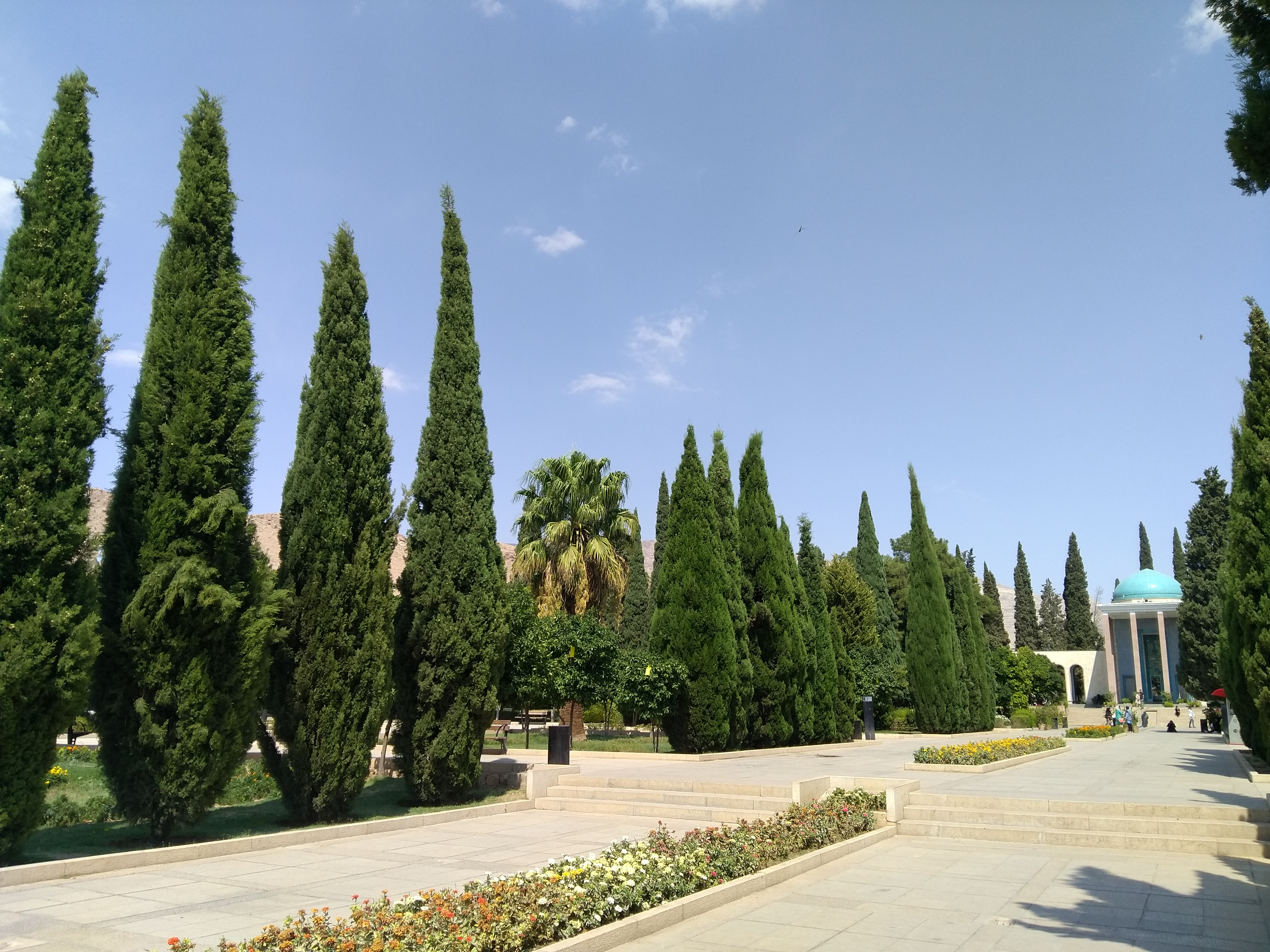
The entrance part of Saadi's tomb, 18 September 2017

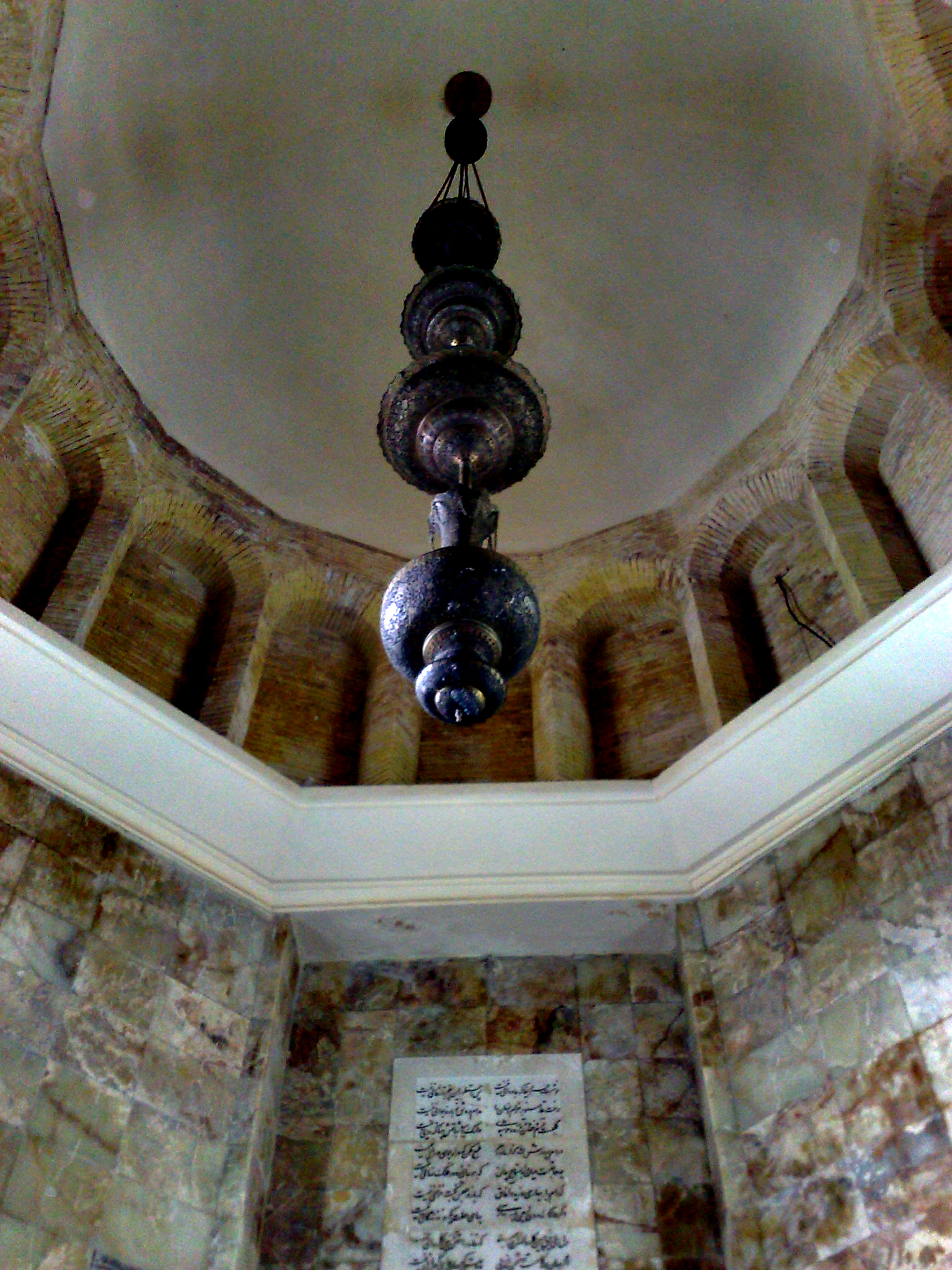
Inside tomb of Saadi-Shirazi, 18 December 2016

== See also ==
- Islamic scholars
- List of Persian poets and authors
- Persian literature in the West
- Tomb of Anarkali

=== Noted Saadi researchers ===
- Mohammad Ali Foroughi
- Hossein Elahi Ghomshei
- Kavoos Hasanli
- Ziya Movahed
