= Qadi Baydawi =

Sunni Islamic scholar (died 1319)

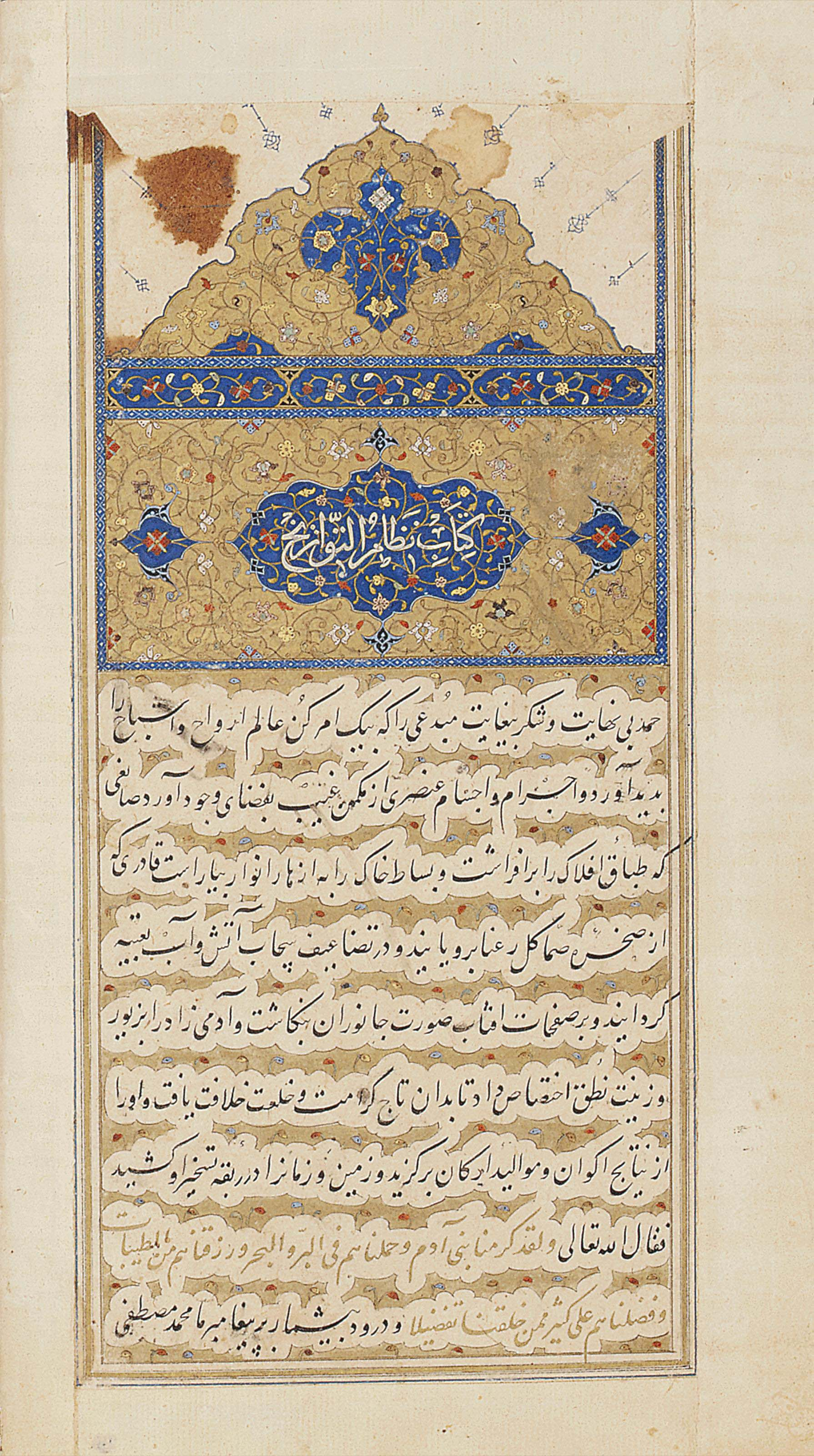
- 16th-century Persian manuscript of Baydawi's Kitab Nizam al-Tawarikh. Copy created in Safavid Iran, probably Tabriz

Personal life
- Born: mid 13th-century Bayda, Fars, Salghurid Kingdom
- Died: June 1319
- Main interest: Tafsir
- Notable work: The Lights of Revelation and the Secrets of Interpretation

Religious life
- Religion: Islam
- Denomination: Sunni,
- Jurisprudence: Shafi'i
- Creed: Ashari

Muslim leader
- Influenced by: Fakhr al-Din al-Razi, Al-Raghib al-Isfahani

Qadi Baydawi (also known as Naṣir ad-Din al-Bayḍawi, ʿAbdallāh ibn ʿUmar al-Baiḍāwī, and variously spelled Baidawi, Bayzawi and Beyzavi; died September–October 1292 (Shawwal 691 AH) in Tabriz) was a Persian jurist, theologian, grammarian, historian, and Quran commentator, best known for one of the most widely known works of tafsīr. He belonged to the Shāfiʿī school of law and eventually became chief qāḍī (judge) of Shiraz.

Baydawi lived in the post-Seljuk and early Mongol period under the Salghurids. During this period the Iranian region under Salghurid rule remained comparatively sheltered because of the dynasty's accommodation with the Mongols, making it a place of refuge for scholars. Baydawi in turn benefited from the learned men who came there. Details of his life are preserved in his work al-Gayah al-Kusvâ.

His celebrated Qurʾānic commentary was a comprehensive tafsīr based largely on al-Zamakhshārī's Kashshāf. Deliberately conceived as a compilation useful to both students and scholars, it attained considerable popularity and became the basis for numerous later works of tafsīr. Baydawi also wrote on law, grammar, and scholastic theology and composed several theological treatises. His only work in Persian, Kitab Nizam al-Tawarikh, has been described as the first historical work to present an ethno-national history of Iran.

== Biography ==
Baydawi was a native of Bayda (from which his nisba was derived), a small town in the Fars region of southern Iran. Since 1148, the region had been controlled by the Salghurids, a family of Turkoman origin, who would rule as nominal vassals of the Seljuks, the Khwarazmshahs, and the Mongols until their downfall in 1282. Baydawi's date of birth is unknown, however, assessing his accomplishments throughout his career, it can be deduced that he was born sometime during the reign of the Salghurid atabeg (ruler) Abu Bakr ibn Sa'd (r. 1226–1260). During this period, culture flourished in Fars; Abu Bakr ordered the construction of many hospitals and high-level religious establishments which attracted many scholars.

Like the majority of the population of Fars, Baydawi was a Sunni Muslim of the Shafi'ite madhhab (school). Baydawi's education is obscure. According to the historian al-Yafi'i, Baydawi was tutored by his father Umar, who had been a student of Mujir-ad-Din Mahmud ibn Abi-al-Mubarak al-Baghdadi ash-Shafi'i, a former student of Mui'in-ad-Din Abi-Sa'id Mansur ibn Umar al-Baghdadi, who had studied under the prominent philosopher al-Ghazali (died 1111).

His father, Qazi Imam al-Din Abu al-Qasim 'Umar bin al-Sa'id Fakhr ad-Din Abdullah al-Baydawi was a disciple of Sufi Saint, Abu Talib 'Abd al-Mohsin bin Abi al-'Umaid al-Shafi', al-Khafifi al-Abhari (d. 624/1227) who was well versed in religious laws and was illustrious Muslim scholar in the last 6th and early 7th century A.H.

Baydawi became the disciple of a Sufi Saint in Tabriz, Shaikh Muhammad bin Muhammad al-Kunjani. Once he wanted to become the Qadi of Fars under the rule of Arghun Khan so he requested the saint to help him in the matter, as Arghun Khan had a high opinion of Shaikh and used to pay homage to the Shaikh on every Thursday. One day when Arghun Khan visited him, the Shaikh told him that "a Persian scholar had begged a piece of hell from him equal to a prayer rug". Arghun Khan wanted further explanation regarding the statement. On this, Shaikh explained to him that Qadi Nasir ud-Din Baydawi wanted the office of the Qadi of Fars. Arghun Khan, on Shaikh's recommendation again appointed him as the Qadi.

Baydawi heard of the Shaikh's remarks made and consequently was much disturbed. He took the words as a warning and became penitent, finally giving up the idea to achieve his desired post. Eventually, he lost his interest in the worldly affairs and settled permanently at Tabriz and spent the rest of his life there. While staying at Tabriz, he began to visit his Shaikh regularly till his death at Tabriz. A narration is also there that he completed his Quranic commentary on a hint by the same Shaikh. He spent his old age in mystic activities at Tabriz.

Imam Baydawi, according to Zarkobe, died at Tabriz and was buried in the Charand-ab graveyard and his grave stood near the shrine of his spiritual guide, Shaikh Muhammad bin Muhammad al-Kunjani. Muhammad Ma'sum Shirazi reports his burial on the east of the shrine of Shaikh Zia ud-Din Yahya in the same graveyard.

== Works ==
al-Baydawi wrote on many subjects, including fiqh (jurisprudence), history, Arabic grammar, tafsir and theology.

His major work is the commentary on the Qur'an entitled The Lights of Revelation and the Secrets of Interpretation (Anwar al-Tanzil wa-Asrar al-Ta'wil)'. This work is largely a condensed and amended edition of al-Zamakhshari's (al-Kashshaf). That work, which displays great learning, is affected by Mu'tazilite views, which al-Baydawi has tried to amend, sometimes by refuting them and sometimes by omitting them. In addition to drawing heavily from al-Kashshaf, al-Baydawi's tafsir also relied on the tafsirs of Fakhr al-Din al-Razi and al-Raghib al-Isfahani. It has been edited by Heinrich Leberecht Fleischer (2 vols., Leipzig, 1846-1848; indices ed. W. Fell, Leipzig, 1878). A selection with numerous notes was edited by D. S. Margoliouth as Chrestomathia Beidawiana (London, 1894), and his commentary on Sūra 12 was edited and translated by A. F. L. Beeston.

His historical work Nizam al-Tawarikh (The Ordering of Histories) was written in Persian, his native language. It seems to be part of an effort to encourage Abaqa Khan, the Buddhist ruler of Iraq to legitimize Ilkhanate rule in Iraq by conversion to Islam. This work played a key-role in the formation of the ethno-national history of Iran, being the first book devoted to its national history.

His theological/kalamic work "Tawali' al-Anwar min Matali' al-Anzar" is about the logic of kalam in the Islamic theological tradition.

His other works: al-Gayah al-Kusvâ, Minhaj al-Usul ila Ilm al-Usul, Lub al-Albâb, Risala fî Ta'rifat al-Ulûm, Tuhfeh al-Abrâr, Havâs al-Quran.

== See also ==
- List of Ash'aris
- List of Muslim theologians

== Sources ==
- Limbert, John (2004). Shiraz in the Age of Hafez. University of Washington Press. pp. 1–182. ISBN 9780295802886.
- Saleh, Walid (2017). "al-Bayḍāwī". In Fleet, Kate; Krämer, Gudrun; Matringe, Denis; Nawas, John; Rowson, Everett (eds.). Encyclopaedia of Islam (3rd ed.). Brill Online. ISSN 1873-9830.
- Ibrahim, Lutpi (1979). "Al-Baydāwī's Life and Works". Islamic Studies. 18: 311–321. JSTOR 20847119. (registration required)
- This in turn cites:
  - C. Brockelmann, Geschichte der arabischen Litteratur (Weimar 1898), vol. i. pp. 416–418.
- Peacock, A. C. S. (2007). Mediaeval Islamic Historiography and Political Legitimacy: Balʿamī's Tārīkhnāma. London and New York: Routledge. ISBN 978-0-415-40025-1.
- Ashraf, Ahmad (2006). "Iranian identity iii. Medieval Islamic period". Encyclopaedia Iranica, Vol. XIII, Fasc. 5. pp. 507–522.
- Jackson, Peter (2017). The Mongols and the Islamic World: From Conquest to Conversion. Yale University Press. pp. 1–448. ISBN 9780300227284. JSTOR 10.3366/j.ctt1n2tvq0. (registration required)
- Lane, George E. (2012). "The Mongols in Iran". In Daryaee, Touraj (ed.). The Oxford Handbook of Iranian History. Oxford University Press. pp. 1–432. ISBN 978-0-19-987575-7.
- Lane, George (2014). "Persian Notables and the Families Who Underpinned the Ilkhanate": 182–213.
