= Salghurids =

Historical Turkmen dynasty that ruled Fars (12-13th centuries AD)

Salghurids سلغُریان
- 1148–1282
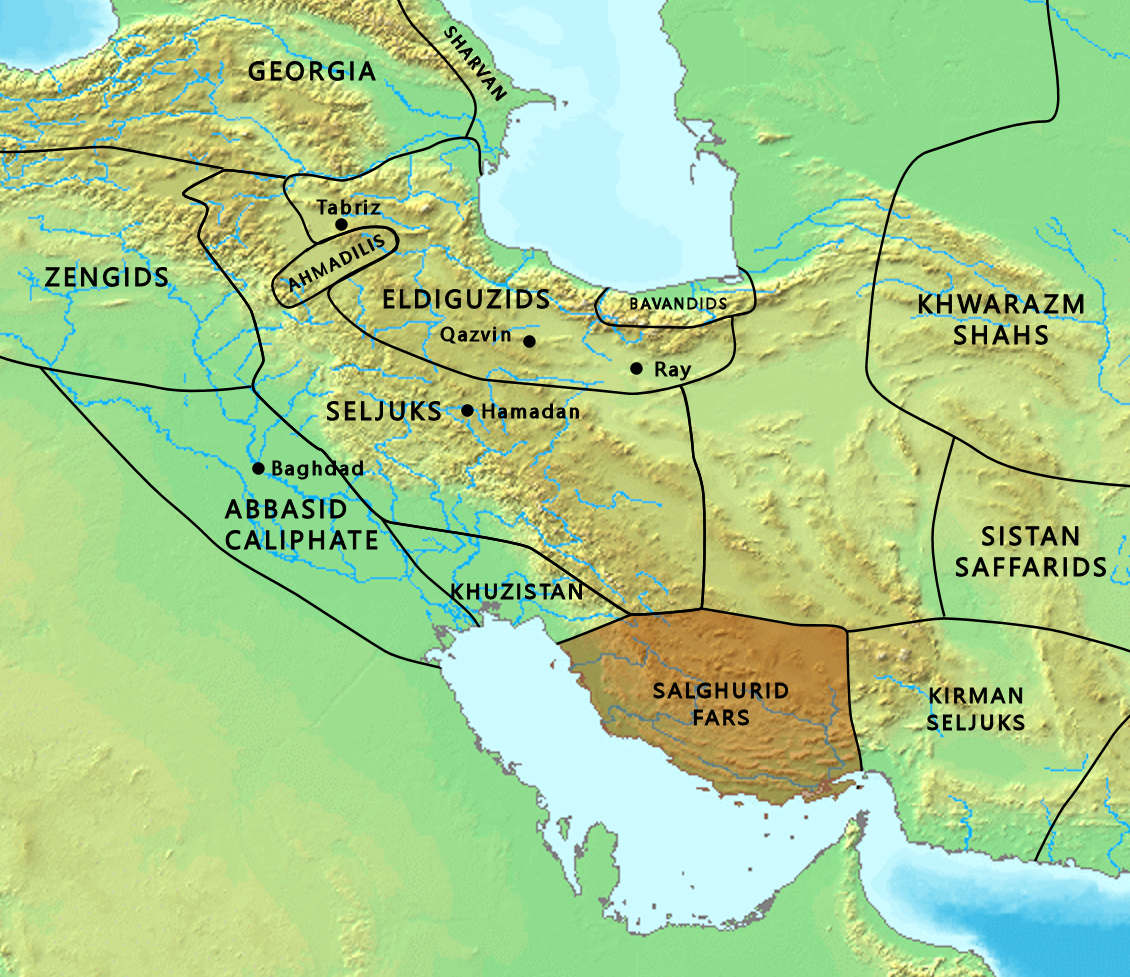
- Map of the Salghurids in 1180 CE.
- Status: Atabegate
- Capital: Shiraz
- Common languages: Persian (official, court literature); Turkic (ruling dynasty)
- Religion: Sunni Islam
- Government: Monarchy
- Atabeg
  - 1148–1161: Sunqur ibn Mawdud
  - 1264–1282: Abish Khatun
- Historical era: Middle Ages
  - Established: 1148
  - Disestablished: 1282
Preceded by	Succeeded by
Seljuk Empire	Ilkhanate

The Salghurids (Persian: سلغُریان), also known as the Atabegs of Fars (اتابکان فارس), were a Persianate dynasty of Salur Turkoman origin that ruled Fars, first as vassals of the Seljuks then for the Khwarazm Shahs in the 13th century.

== History ==
The Salghurids were established by Sunqur in 1148, who had profited from the rebellions during the reign of Seljuq sultan Mas'ud ibn Muhammad. Later the Salghurids were able to solidify their position in southern Persia to the point of campaigning against Kurds and involving themselves in the succession of the Kirman Seljuqs, holding Seljuq sultan Malik-Shah III's son Mahmud as a possible claimant to the Seljuq throne. During the reign of Sunqur, a cathedral mosque was built in Shiraz.

Under Sa'd I ibn Zangi, the Salghurids experienced a significant prosperity, which was marred by his acknowledging the Khwarazm Shahs as his overlord. Saadi Shirazi, the Persian poet, dedicated his Bostan and Gulistan to Sa'd I and Sa'd II. Following Sa'd I's death, his brother Zangi ibn Mawdud took power in 1161. Tekele followed his father, Zangi, only after eliminating Sonqur's son Toghril. They briefly occupied Isfahan in 1203–4, and later occupied Bahrain taken from the Uyunid dynasty in 1235.

During the closing years of Abu Bakr ibn Sa'd and Sa'd II, Fars fell under the dominion of Mongol empire and later the Ilkhanate of Hulegu. Under the Mongols, Abu Bakr was given the title of Qutlugh Khan. Later Salghurids were powerless figureheads, until the daughter of Sa'd II, Abish Khatun was given the title of Atabegate of Fars. She was the sole ruler of Fars for one year whereupon she married, Mengu Temur, eleventh son of Hulegu. Following their deaths, Fars was ruled directly by the Ilkhanate.

== Culture ==
During the 13th century, the Salghurids patronized a cultural and intellectual atmosphere which included, Qadi Baydawi, Qutb al-Din al-Shirazi, Saadi Shirazi and the historian Wassaf. The Salghurids knowingly promoted themselves as an Iranian and Islamic dynasty, partly through their links to the ruins of the pre-Islamic Achaemenid Empire (550–330 BC). Under them, Shiraz became a hub for Persian culture.

== List of Atabegs ==
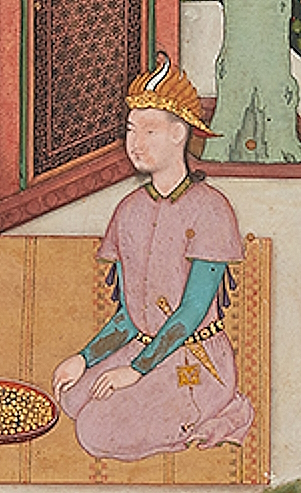
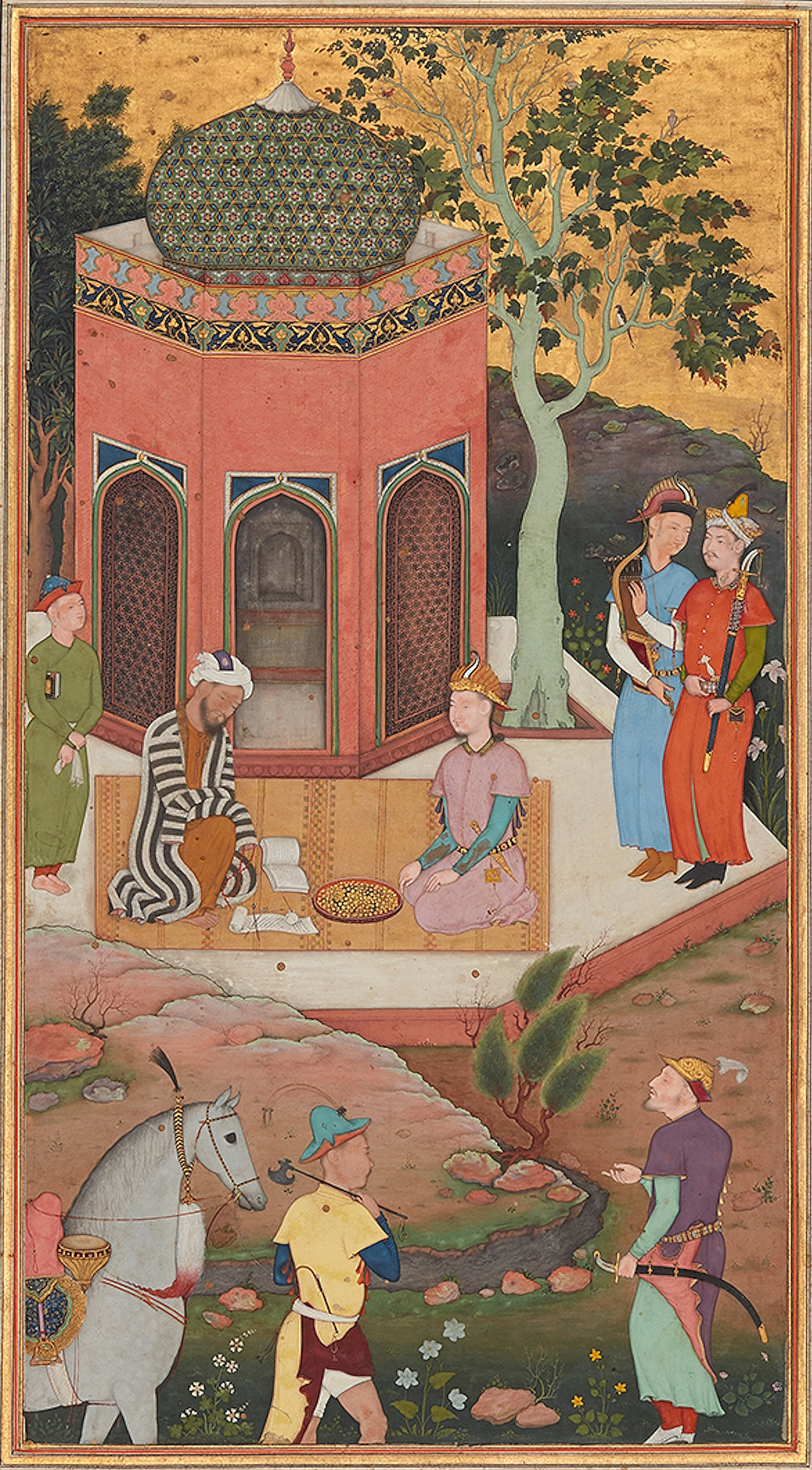
Salghurid Atabeg Abu Bakr ibn Sa'd (r.1226-60), in a scene with the Persian poet Saadi Shirazi. Mughal painting, dated circa 1604
- Sunqur ibn Mawdud (1148–1161)
- Zangi ibn Mawdud (1161–1178)
- Tekele ibn Zangi (1178–1198)
- Sa'd I ibn Zangi (1198–1226)
- Abu Bakr ibn Sa'd (1226–1260)
- Sa'd II (1260–1260)
- Muhammad I ibn Sa'd (1260–1262)
- Muhammad II ibn Salghur (1263)
- Saljuk Shah ibn Salghur (1263)
- Abish Khatun (1263–1284)
  - Möngke Temür (1272–1282)
- Kurdujin Khatun (1319–1338, disputed)

== Genealogy of House of Salghur ==
House of Salghur

Salghurids

Maw'dud
Sunghur r. 1148–1161	Zangi r. 1161–1178
Tughril r. 1194–1203	Takla r. 1178–1194	Sa'd I r. 1203–1231
Abu Bakr r. 1231–1260	Salghur
Sa'd II r. 1260–1260	Muhammad II r. 1262–1263	Salchuq r. 1263–1264
Muhammad I r. 1260–1262	Abish r. 1264–1284

== Sources ==
- Bosworth, C. E. (1968). "The Political and Dynastic History of the Iranian World (A.D. 1000–1217)". In Frye, R. N. (ed.). The Cambridge History of Iran, Volume 5: The Saljuq and Mongol periods. Cambridge University Press. pp. 1–202. ISBN 978-0-521-06936-6. Archived from the original on 2022-01-23.
- Bosworth, C. E. (1995). "Salg̲h̲urids". In Bosworth, C. E.; van Donzel, E.; Heinrichs, W. P. & Lecomte, G. (eds.). The Encyclopaedia of Islam, Second Edition. Volume VIII: Ned–Sam. Leiden: E. J. Brill. pp. 978–979. ISBN 978-90-04-09834-3.
- Bosworth, C. E. (1996). The New Islamic Dynasties: A Chronological and Genealogical Manual. Columbia University Press. ISBN 0-231-10714-5.
- Darling, Linda T. (2013). A History of Social Justice and Political Power in the Middle East: The Circle of Justice from Mesopotamia to Globalization. Routledge. ISBN 978-0415503624.
- de Nicola, Bruno (2020). "Pādshāh Khatun: An Example of Architectural, Religious, and Literary Patronage in Ilkhanid Iran". In Biran, Michal; Brack, Jonathan; Fiaschetti, Francesca (eds.). Along the Silk Roads in Mongol Eurasia: Generals, Merchants, and Intellectuals. University of California Press. pp. 270–289. ISBN 978-0520298743.
- Durand-Guédy, David (2015). "1147: The Battle of Qara-Tegin and the Rise of Azarbayjan". Der Islam. 92 (1). De Gruyter: 161–196. doi:10.1515/islam-2015-0007.
- Kamola, Stefan (2019). Making Mongol History Rashid al-Din and the Jamiʿ al-Tawarikh. Edinburgh University Press. ISBN 978-1474421423.
- Katouzian, Homa (2007). Iranian History and Politics: The Dialectic of State and Society. Routledge. ISBN 978-0415297547.
- Khanbaghi, Aptin (2016). "Champions of the Persian Language: The Mongols or the Turks?". In Nicola, Bruno; Melville, Charles (eds.). The Mongols' Middle East: Continuity and Transformation in Ilkhanid Iran. Brill. pp. 193–215. ISBN 978-9004311992.
- Ingenito, Domenico (2013). ""Tabrizis in Shiraz are Worth Less than a Dog:" Sa'dī and Humām, a Lyrical Encounter". In Pfeiffer, Judith (ed.). Politics, Patronage and the Transmission of Knowledge in 13th – 15th Century Tabriz. Brill. pp. 77–129. ISBN 978-9004255395.
- Limbert, John (2004). Shiraz in the Age of Hafez. University of Washington Press. ISBN 978-0295983912.
- Minorsky, V. (1938). "Geographical Factors in Persian Art". Bulletin of the School of Oriental Studies, University of London. 9 (3): 621–652.
- Spuler, B. (1983). "Abū Bakr b. Saʿd". In Yarshater, Ehsan (ed.). Encyclopædia Iranica. Vol. I/3: Ablution, Islamic–Abū Manṣūr Heravı̄. London and New York: Routledge & Kegan Paul. p. 261. ISBN 978-0-71009-092-8.
- Spuler, B. (1987). "Atābakān-e Fārs". In Yarshater, Ehsan (ed.). Encyclopædia Iranica. Vol. II/8: Aśoka IV–Āṯār al-Wozarāʾ. London and New York: Routledge & Kegan Paul. pp. 894–896. ISBN 978-0-71009-108-6.
