= Abish Khatun =

Ruler of the Salghurids of Shiraz (r. 1264–1284)

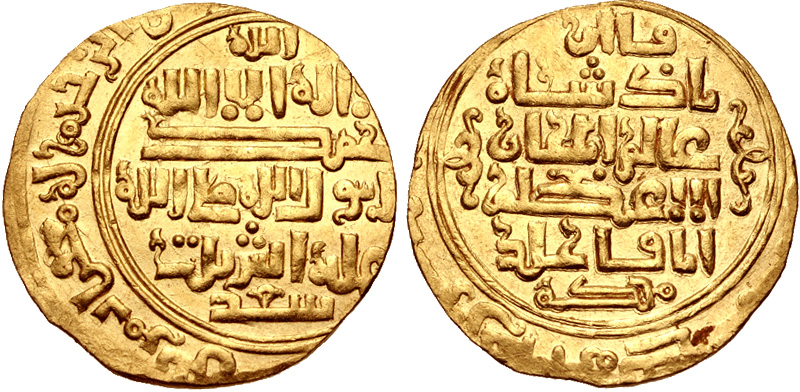
- Gold coin of Abish Khatun, citing Ilkhan Abaqa as overlord

Ruler of Shiraz
- Reign: 1264–1284
- Predecessor: Saljuqshah
- Successor: Kurdujin Khatun (from 1319)
- Co-ruler: Möngke Temür (1272–1282)
- Born: 1259 or 1260; Shiraz
- Died: 1285/1286; Tabriz, Ilkhanate
- Spouse: Möngke Temür
- Issue: Kurdujin Khatun; Alghanchi
- Dynasty: Salghurids
- Father: Sa'd II

Abish Khatun (Persian: آبش خاتون) – was the 9th and last ruler of the Salghurids of Shiraz from 1264 to 1284.

== Life as princess ==
She was born in Shiraz around 1259/1260 to Salghurid Atabeg Sa'd II (ca) and Turkan Khatun (who was originally from Yazd). After the death of Sa'd II, Turkan Khatun held power, acting as regent of her short-lived son and then, and to secure her position, married Saljuqshah, the ruling Atabeg. He later had Turkan Khatun killed. Saljuqshah later started a rebellion against Ilkhanate, killing two local basqaqs. Hulegu khan in his turn executed Muhammadshah, elder brother of Saljuqshah, sent an army under commanders Altaju and Temür to suppress revolt. Saljuqshah suddenly found himself under siege from Nizam al-Din Hasanwayh of Shabankara, Atabeg Alauddawla Mahmud of Yazd and Adud al-Din Amir Hajji – commander of Qutlugh-khanids. In the battle near Kazerun, Shabakara chief was killed by Saljuqshah. Saljuqshah found refuge in the Friday Mosque, but Mongols stormed the mosque, capturing, torturing and finally executing him in 1264.

== Reign ==
Abish Khatun was declared the Atabeg of Fars on the orders from Hulegu. The khutba was also proclaimed in her name, signifying her confirmation as sovereign monarch. She and her older sister Bibi Salghum (widow of Muhammadshah) was taken to Ilkhanate capital by their grandmother Yaqut Turkan (daughter of Buraq Hajib).

Another revolt started in 1265 by local Islamic preacher Shaykh Sharaf al-Din Ibrahim during her reign was suppressed cruelly. Abish's Mongol overseers Altaju, Shadi, Damur all followed each other hastily as the result of ongoing turmoil. Situation was stabilized when Abaqa Khan appointed Angyanu – a Turk overseer to the province. However his actions also draw a hate from Shirazi elite and he war removed from his post in 1271. New overseer Suqunjaq Noyan (grandson of Chilaun) arranged Abish Khatun's marriage. She was already betrothed to Mengü Temür (son of Hulegu) by 1261, she went on to marrying him in 1272. Although it was against sharia to marry a Muslim woman to a non-Muslim, there was a grandiose wedding with lavish gifts according to Wassaf. From this moment she lived in the orda of Oljai Khatun – mother of Mengü Temür. This also made Mengü Temür a de facto ruler of Shiraz. Abish returned to effective rule only in 1284.

When Abish returned to Shiraz there was great celebration and coins were struck in her name for a month. Abish appointed Jalal ad-Din Arqan, a Salghurid descendant and her 2nd cousin once removed as the new chief minister. Abish's corrupt government coincided with a famine where over 100.000 people died in Fars. Furthermore, she got into a power struggle with new overseer Sayyed Imadaddin, leading to his murder on 30 December 1284. As the result Buqa and Arghun ordered removal of Abish from her post. She was summoned to the court later and was interrogated. It was Jalal ad-Din Arqan first to reveal the details of murder, after which he was sawed in half. She was ordered to may blood money to Sayyed's sons as the result of court.

== Death ==
She remained in Tabriz's Charandab district and died from an illness after a year. She was the last sovereign of the Salghurid dynasty.

== Family ==
She was married to Mengü Temür (son of Hulegu) in 1272. She had two daughters: Kurdujin Khatun and Alghanchi.
