= Kavoos Hasanli =

Iranian poet and professor (born 1962)

Prof. Kavoos Hassanli (Hasanli)
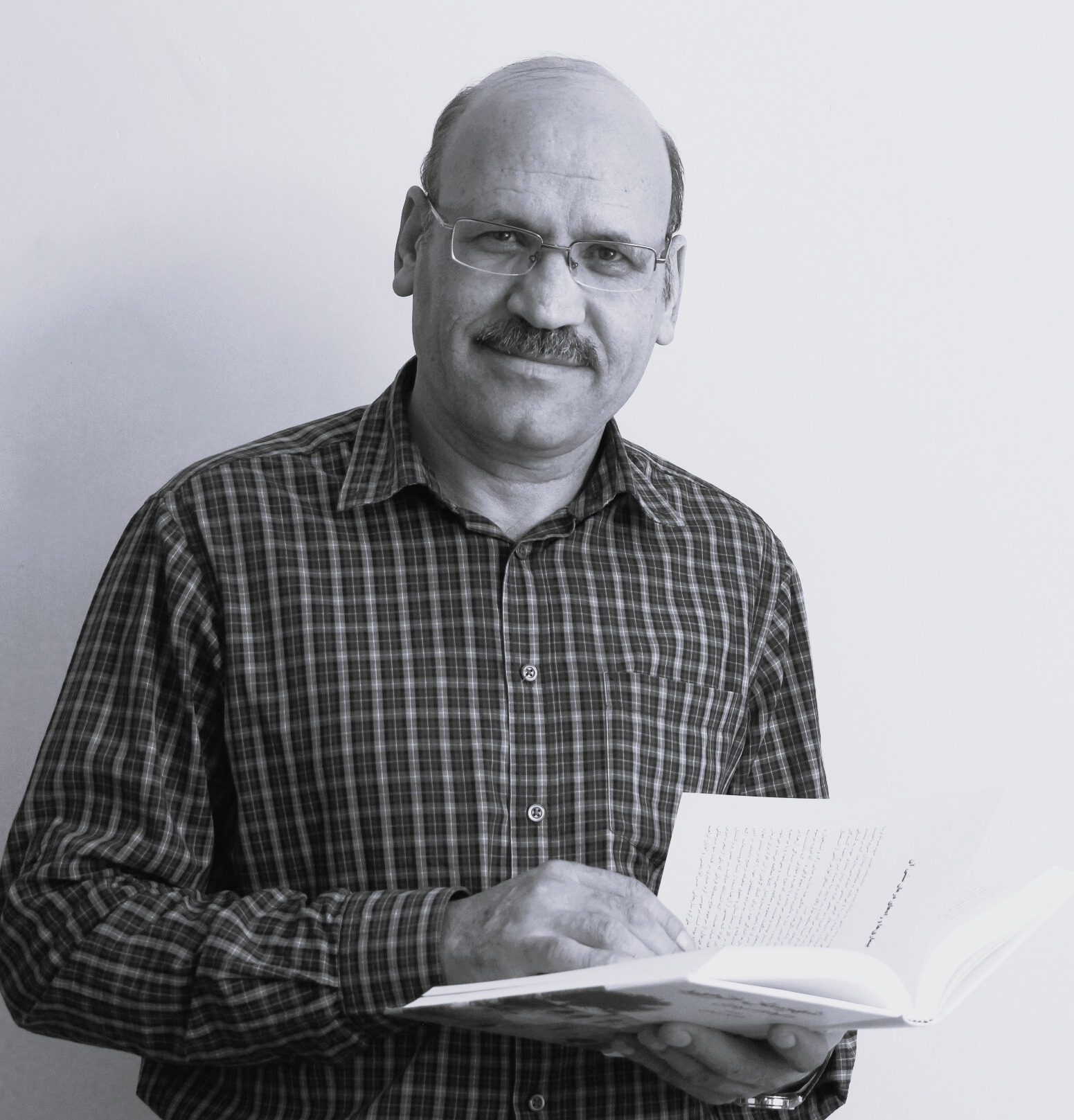
- Kavoos Hassanli \ Hasanli
- Born: May 22, 1962 (age 64); Khorrambid County, Fars, Iran
- Occupations: Poet, Literary critic, Professor at Shiraz University

Kavoos Hassanli (Persian: کاووس حسن‌لی; born May 22, 1962) is a poet, literary critic, and professor at Shiraz University.

== Biography ==
Kavoos Hassanli was born on May 22, 1962, in

Khorrambid in Fars province, Iran. He describes his childhood difficulties as follows; "From the beginning when my eyes opened on water, green land, and flower, poverty was my play mate days and nights. I grew up with it as a child. Now, I am proud of it as I have learnt a lot from it." He did his primary and secondary education is Safashahr, and his pre university in Abadeh. He did his undergraduate and his post graduate studies in Persian language and literature in Shiraz University. He was soon promoted to a full professor in the faculty in 2010. He has published memorable pieces and has been awarded the annual book of Sa'di and the annual book of Hafez for his two books; an Encyclopedia of Sa'di Studies and an Encyclopedia of Hafez Studies. Also, he has a good record in management, working on educational and cultural matters. He moved to Turkey for a two-year stay in 2012.

== Books ==
=== Poetry ===
- Dokmehaye Gij (collection of poems and critics), compiled by Mohammad Hossein Ebrahimi. Kooleposhti publication, Tehran, 2015.
- Beyond the Coquetry of Marmara (Posht-e Kereshmehaye Marmara), Istanbul-Turkish translation by Guzelyuz Al, Istanbul: Damavand, 2014.
- Labkhand-e Varooneh (collection of satire: poems). Compiled by Mohammad Moradfi, Navid publication, Shiraz, 2017.
- All the Pens Have Lost Color (Rang az Rokh-e Tamam-e Qalam ha Paride Ast), Tehran: Roozegar, 2004.
- I Desire the Smile of a Mirror (Be Labkhand-e Aeene-ey Teshne), Haft Owrang publication, Shiraz, 2000.
- I am the Shining Moon (Man Mah-e Tabanam) Children's Poetry, Shiraz: Haft Ourang, 1999.

=== Review and research ===
- Echoes of What Remains: 105 Glimpses from a Sixty-Year Journey, Moin publication, Tehran, 2025.
- Bidel and Astonishing Charm: A New Perception of Bidel Dehlavi, Moin publication, Tehran, 2021.
- Bidel and the Conception of Astonishment: The Recognition of Bidel Dehlavi's poem Moin publication, Tehran, 2020.
- Şirazlı Sa'di: Hayatını ve Sözünü Yeniden Anlamak (translated into Turkish by Esra Cakar, Elif Namoglu, Damavand publication, Istanbul, 2017.
- Description research of Nima studies (in collaboration with Elham Karamizadeh), Hermez publication, Tehran, 2016.
- Two way dictionary of Safa-shahr Turkish words (in collaboration with Khosrow Rashidi), Shiraz University publication, 2014.
- Language of Empathy, introducing Iranian famous Poets and Writers, Damavand Publication, Istanbul, Winter 2013.
- Vasf ol Haal, (in collaboration with Kavoos Rezai), Navid Publication in collaboration with Arsanjan Azad University, Shiraz, 2013.
- A Guide to the Study of Sa'di, (in collaboration with Leila Akbari), Shiraz University Publication, 2012
- Aeene ye Mehr Aeen, Foundation for Fars Studies and Mostafavi Publications, 2011.
- Yaadhaa ye Raha dar Baad, Takht-e Jamshid Publication, 2010.
- Daftar e Nasrin va Gol, Takht-e Jamshid Publication and Foundation for Fars Studies, 2010.
- Encyclopedia of Khayyam Studies (karnameye tahlilie Khayyam Pazhuhi), Tehran: Elm 2010.
- Darich e Sobh, A New Reading of the Life and Poetry of S'adi, Khane ye Ketab Publication, 2010.
- A Re-reading of Classic Texts, Elm Publication, Tehran, 2009.
- A Thematic Guide to Hafez Studies, Navid Publication, 2009.
- Sweet Persian Language (Sokhan-e Shirin-e Parsi) (in collaboration with Dr. Sayyedkuh, Dr. Abdollahi & Dr. Parsa), Tehran: SAMT, 2004, 10th edition 2007.
- A New Reading of the Life and Poetry of Hafez Shirazi (translated into Arabic by Shaker Amerie), Morocco: ISESCO Publications, 2007.
- Dusting the Path of Sight (Ghobarzodai az Masire Tamasha), Tehran: Roozegar, 2007.
- The Spring of the Sun (Cheshme-ye Khorshid), ISESCO Publications Navid & Center for Hafez Studies, 2006.
- Simple but Much Variegated (Sade-ye Besyar Naqsh), Tehran: Elmi-Farhangi Publications, 2005.
- Sweeter Than Sugar (Shirintar az Qand), Tehran:Ahl-e Qalam, 2004, 2nd edition 2005.
- A Leaf of the Divine Tree (Varaq-e Derakht-e Tuba), Shiraz: Sa’di Studies Center, 2004.
- Vamaq va Azra, Edited and abridged, Tehran: Ahl-e Qalam, 2004.
- Innovations in Contemporary Persian Poetry (Gune ha-ye No avari dar She’r Mo’aser-e Iran), Tehran: Saales, 2004.
- Golestan, a Rewriting. Tehran: Ahl-e Qalam, 2003.
- Encyclopedia of Sa'di Studies (Farahang-e Sa'di Pazhuhi), Shiraz: Fars Studies Organization, 2001.
- Sa'di the Fiery Tongue (Sa'di-ye Atash Zaban), Shiraz: Fars Studies Organization, 2001.
- Resurrection of Language (Rastakhiz e Kalam, Collection of essays), Shiraz: Peiravi, 2000.
- The Beloved's Ringlets (Selsele-ye Mu-ye Dust), Shiraz: Haft Ourang, 1999.

=== Editing ===
- Vasf ol Haal (in collaboration with Kavoos Rezai), Navid Publication in collaboration with Arsanjan Azad University, Shiraz, 2013.
- Poetry Book of Sheikh Aminodin Balyani (in collaboration with Mohammad Barakat), Tehran: Farhangestan e Honar, 2008.
- Masnavi of Oshtorname (in collaboration with Kavoos Rezai), Zavar Publications, 2007.
- Masnavi of Mehr o Mah (in collaboration with Kavoos Rezai), Navid Publications, 2007.
- Masnavi of Vamaq va Azra (in collaboration with Kavoos Rezai), Tehran: Roozegar, 2004.

== Some of What others have written about Kavoos Hassanli's works ==
- Narrative Construction and Biographical Storytelling (about the book Harche Yāda Yād), Dr. Sanaz Mojarad, Bukhara Journal, No. 169, July–August 2025.
- Be seyl-e bāgh raftom jāt khāli (about the book Harche Yāda Yād: Echoes of What Remains), Abdolrahman Mojāhed Naqi, Atash Journal, No. 32, July–August 2025.
- Echoes of What Remains: 105 Glimpses from a Sixty-Year Journey: Introduction to the Book Harche Yāda Yād, by Amin Faghiri, Atash Journal, No. 31, May–June 2025.
- Bidel and the Conception of Astonishment, Abd al-Rahman Mojahid Naqi, Asr-e Mardom, March 4, 2021.
- A New Window into Bidel's World”, Farzaneh Moeini, Chameh Literary Bimonthly, No. 13, August–September 2020
- Labkhand-e Varooneh (collection of satire: poems). Compiled by Mohammad Moradfi, Navid publication, Shiraz, 2017. Studies Report Card, Baha’eddin Khoramshahi, Bukhara, Vol. 20, No. 119, August–September 2017, pp. 295–304.
- On the cost of Marmara: A Glance at Kavoos Hassanli's New Poems”, Ali Abdollahi, in The Dokmehā-ye gij, (Poems and Critiques), ed. Mohammad Hossein Ebrahimi, Kooleposhti Publications, Tehran, 2016.
- The Secret of the Butterflies’ Flight (On the Structure of the Poem ‘The Attack of Butterflies’)” Dr. Farzaneh Moeini, in The Dokmehā-ye gij, (Poems and Critiques), ed. Mohammad Hossein Ebrahimi, Kooleposhti Publications, Tehran, 2016.
- A Critique of The Dokmehā-ye gij, Dr. Parvin Salajegheh, in The Dokmehā-ye gij, (Poems and Critiques), ed. Mohammad Hossein Ebrahimi, Kooleposhti Publications, Tehran, 2016.
- The Dokmehā-ye gij (Poems and Critiques), ed. Mohammad Hossein Ebrahimi, Kooleposhti Publications, Tehran, 2016.
- Memories and Reflections: A Monograph on Dr. Kavoos Hassanli, Nazita Barzegar and Ali Eskandari, Navid Publications and Islamic Azad University of Arsanjan, 2014.
- A Thematic Guide to Hafez Studies: Mohammad Reza Sharaf, Anjoman e Asar va Mafakher Farhangi, 2010.
- A formalistic reading of Magar poem: Mohsen Gha'emi, Faslname Sh'er, 2010.
- A Thematic Guide to Hafez Studies: Ahmad Parsa, Ketab e Mah e Adabiat, 2010.
- The Spring of the Sun (Cheshme-ye Khorshid): Farzaneh Mo'eni, Ketab e Mah e Adabiat, 2008.
- The Reflection of 75 Years of Sa'di Studies in a Book, Farzaneh Mo'eni, Faslname Sh'er, 2008.
- All the Pens Have Lost Color (Rang az Rokh-e Tamam-e Qalam ha Paride Ast): Mohammad Hakim, Faslname Sh'er, 2008.
- The Encyclopedia of Sa'di Studies: Davood Gholamzadeh, Ketab e Mah e Adabiat, 2007.
- Innovations in Contemporary Persian Poetry (Gune ha-ye No-avari dar She’r Mo’aser-e Iran): Mohammad Hakim Azar & Shahla Nazari, Ketab e Mah e Adabiat, 2007.
- Innovations in Contemporary Persian Poetry (Gune ha-ye No-avari dar She’r Mo’aser-e Iran): Mostafa Sedighi, Roodaki, 2007.

== Some of Academic and Professional records ==
- The editorial board member of journal of Middle East studies, Istanbul university, 2012.
- The editorial board member of journal of al dirasat al adabi, Lebanese University, 2012.
- Chairman of the Center for Islamic Iranian Culture and Art, Fars, 2010.
- Editor of the Journal of Iranian Children's Literature Studies, Shiraz University, 2009.
- Chairman of the academic panel for Literature and Linguistics of Maktab International Conference, Shiraz, 2007.
- Member of academic committee for Promotion of Persian Language and Iranology, Ministry of Science, Research & Technology from 2007.
- Chairman of the Academic Center for Literary & Cultural studies, Fars, 2005.
- Chairman of the Academic Center for Poets and writer, Fars, 2004.
- Academic director of the center for Hafez Studies, 2000.
- Founder and director of the center for Sa'di Studies, 1996–1999.
- Founder and committee member of the center for Hafez Studies, 1996.

== Some of Distinctions ==
- Awarded in the 8th Book Criticism Festival, Article: An Investigation of Three Books on the History of Iran's Literature Written by non-Iranian Writers, 2011.
- Awarded for the selected book of the year, the 2nd Festival of Culture, 2001.
- Awarded the Annual Book Prize of Hafez, Book: A Thematic Guide to Hafez Studies, 2010.
- Awarded as the manager of Iran's Qotb e Elmi, the 10th research festival in Iran, 2009.
- Awarded as the selected poet of Iran, the 3rd Fajr International Poetry Festival, 2008.
- Selected book of the year: Innovations in Modern Persian Poetry, 2004.
- Awarded as the best book of contemporary Poetry: All the Pens have Lost Color, 2004.
- Selected best National writer and poet of the year, 2003.
- Awarded the prize of Best Book on Sa'di for the book Sa'di studies, 2002.
