= Homa Katouzian =

Iranian economist, writer and researcher

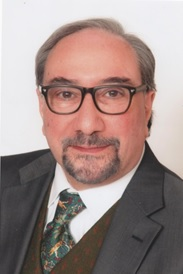
- Katouzian in March 2015
- Born: November 17, 1942 (age 83); Tehran
- Occupations: Economist, historian, political scientist, literary critic

Homa Katouzian (Persian: همايون کاتوزیان; born Homayoun Katouzian on 17 November 1942) is an economist, historian, sociologist and literary critic, with a special interest in Iranian studies. Katouzian's formal academic training was in economics and the social sciences but he concurrently continued his studies of Persian history and literature at a professional academic level. He began studying the life and works of the modern Persian writer, Sadeq Hedayat, and that of the Prime Minister of Iran in the early 1950s, Mohammad Mosaddeq, while still a faculty member in the department of economics at the University of Kent at Canterbury. Having taught economics at universities in Britain and other countries for eighteen years, he took voluntary retirement from the University of Kent (UK) in 1986 to devote his entire time to Iranian studies. In recent years, he has been teaching and writing on classical Persian literature, in particular the 13th-century poet and writer, Sa'di. Currently based at the University of Oxford, Katouzian is a member of the Faculty of Asian and Middle Eastern Studies He was a reperch fellow at St Antony's College, University of Oxford (2004-2025) where for thirteen years he edited the bimonthly Iranian Studies, the journal of the Association for Iranian Studies. He is Editor of the International Journal of Persian Literature, Co-editor, Routledge's Iranian studies book series, and Associate Editor, Springer Iranian and Persian Studies Series. He is also a former member of the editorial board of Comparative Studies of South Asia, Africa and the Middle East and Comparative Economic Studies.

== Biography ==
Katouzian was born in Tehran, Iran. After graduation from Alborz High School and a year at the University of Tehran, in 1961 he went to Britain to study economics. He received his bachelor's degree from the University of Birmingham; his master's from the University of London; and his Ph.D. from the University of Kent at Canterbury. Between 1968 and 1986, he taught economics in Britain, Iran, Canada and the United States, and also worked as an economic consultant with the Organization of American States, the International Labour Organization, and the United Nations Conference on Trade and Development (UNCTAD). He was professor of economics, University of California Los Angeles (UCLA), 1985 and professor of sociology, University of California San Diego (UCSD), 1990. Since 1986, Katouzian has been teaching Persian literature and Iranian history at the University of Oxford and has organized two international conferences: the Hedayat Centenary, at the Middle East Centre, St. Antony's College, March 2003, and Iran Facing the New Century, at Wadham College, April 2004. Katouzian has been involved in Iranian cultural and artistic activities in Britain. He is on the advisory board of the Encyclopaedia Iranica in the field of modern Iranian history and literature. He is also a member of the board of trustees, Library for Iranian Studies, London. He has written for the British press and contributed to BBC radio and television programmes. He is the winner of the first SINA "Outstanding Achievement Award in recognition of Exceptional Contributions in Humanities". He was elected Fellow of the Royal Historical Society (FRHISTS) in 2026.

== Contributions to economics ==
Katouzian has written extensively in pure and applied economics, but his contributions in economics are in the theory of the development of the service sector, the economics of petroleum-exporting countries, and economic method and philosophy.

As early as the late 1960s he predicted that the share of services in output and employment would rapidly grow in advanced countries and in some developing countries, for different sets of reasons, and that the share of non-factor services in international trade would also grow steadily, the advanced countries tending to specialize in the export of services.

Also, he was one of the first economists, from the late 1960s, to describe petroleum revenues received by the petroleum-exporting countries as economic rent, and the countries in question as rentier economies, and studied the effect of the receipt of the petroleum rent by the state on the economics as well as politics of petroleum-exporting countries.

In the field of economic philosophy and method, Katouzian has published a critique of economic method, maintaining that economic theory and theorizing could not be described as scientific, once the economists' own criteria for scientificity are applied to their works. The subject further involved him in a critique of the philosophies of science developed by Karl Popper and Thomas Kuhn arguing that Popper's criteria were no longer applied by modern scientists and that Kuhn's historical generalizations were largely circular.

== Researching modern Iran ==
Katouzian has taught the history of nineteenth and twentieth-century Iran at Oxford University. He has published extensively on twentieth-century Iranian history and has been responsible for a number of cases of historical revisionism, for example that the 1921 coup in Iran was not engineered by the British government; that the Anglo-Persian Agreement of 1919 was not intended to turn Iran into a British protectorate; and that the Iranian-Azarbaijani political leader, Sheikh Mohammad Khiyabani was not a separatist, was not pro-Bolshevik and was not opposed to the 1919 agreement.

== On Iranian history ==
Apart from writing descriptive and analytical history, Katouzian has put forward "the theory of arbitrary despotism or arbitrary rule, and the fundamental state-society conflict in Iranian history" which has led him to comparative studies of the sociology of Iranian history with that of Europe. The theory has been described virtually in all of his major writings on Iranian history, but, within a single volume, it is propounded in his Iranian History and Politics, the Dialectic of State and Society (2008). Here, he has also introduced the concept of The Short-term Society or "Jameheh-ye Kolangi", literally meaning "the pick-axe society", an allusion to the Iranian practice of demolishing buildings after only a few decades, considering them to be "dilapidated". He has developed and discussed this theory more extensively in the article, "The Short-Term Society, A Comparative Study in the Long-Term Problems of Political and Economic Development in Iran", published in Middle Eastern Studies, 40, 1, 2004 and reprinted in his Iran: Politics, History and Literature, 2013.

== On Persian literature ==
Katouzian has both taught and written on modern as well as classical Persian literature and has taught modern poetry and fiction at Oxford University. Modern writers he has written about include Sadeq Hedayat, and Mohammad Ali Jamalzadeh, the founder of modern Persian fiction. He has also published on modern poets such as the Poet Laureate Mohammad Taqi Bahar and Iraj Mirza, and modernist poets such as Forugh Farrokhzad. He has taught classical Persian literature from the 10th century to the 19th century, both in prose and poetry. His special subject is the great Persian classic, Sa'di, on whom he has published four books in Persian and English. He is also a poet and short-story writer in Persian.

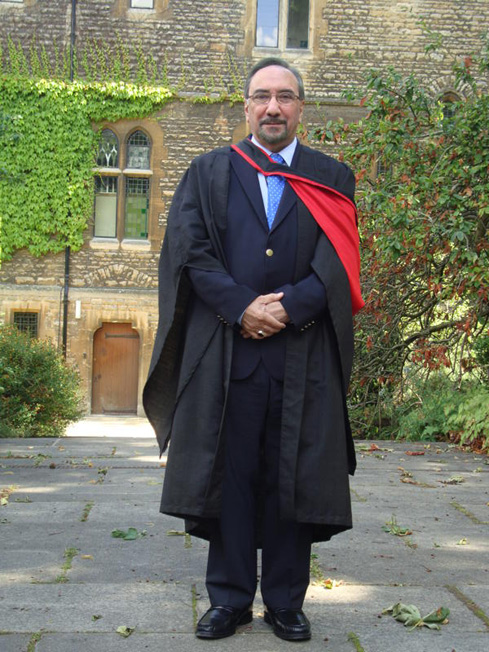

== Personal life ==
Katouzian has a son and a daughter, both living in Oxford.

== Publications ==
Books in English

- Iran and the Revolution, New Haven and London, Yale University Press, 2026.
- Iran under the Pahlavi Monarchy, Essays in Iranian History, Politics, Culture and Literature, London and North America, Routledge, 2025.
- Humour in Iran, Eleven-hundred Years of Satire and Humour in Persian Literature, I. B. Tauris, London and New York, 2024, paperback edition, 2025.
- Poetry and Revolution: The Poets and Poetry of the Constitutional Era of Iran, Routledge (co-ed), London and North America, July 2022, paperback edition, 2023.
- Sadeq Hedayat, The Life and Legend of an Iranian Writer, second edition (h&p), I. B. Tauris, an imprint of Bloomsbury Publishing, London, Oxford, New York, New Delhi, Sydney, 2022.
- Khalil Maleki, the Human face of Iranian Socialism, London: Oneworld, 2018.
- Sa'di in Love: The Lyrical Verses of Persia's Master Poet, London and New York: I. B. Tauris, 2016, supported by Roshan Cultural Heritage Institute and Soudavar Memorial Foundation.
- Iran: Politics, History and Literature, London and New York: Routledge, 2013.
- Iran: A Beginners' Guide, London: Oneworld, 2013.
- Sadeq Hedayat, His Work and His Wondrous World, ed., London and New York: Routledge, paperback edition, 2011(hardback edition, 2008).
- The Persians: Ancient, Mediaeval and Modern Iran, New Haven and London: Yale University Press, paperback edition, 2010 (hardback edition, 2009).
- Iran in the 21st Century, (co-ed with Hossein Shahidi), London and New York: Routledge, 2008 (hb&pb).
- Iranian History and Politics, the Dialectic of State and Society, London and New York: Routledge, paperback edition, 2007 (hardback edition, 2003).
- Sa'di, the Poet of Life, Love and Compassion, Oxford: Oneworld Publishers, 2006.
- State and Society in Iran: The Eclipse of the Qajars and the Rise of the Pahlavis, London and New York: I. B. Tauris, paperback edition, 2006 (hardback edition, 2000).
- Sadeq Hedayat: The Life and Legend of an Iranian Writer, first paperback edition, London and New York: I. B. Tauris, 2002; (hardback edition, 1991).
- Musaddiq and the Struggle for Power in Iran, London and New York: I. B. Tauris, revised paperback edition, 1999; first edition, 1990. Arabic translation, Mosaddeq (see below).
- Musaddiq's Memoirs, London: Jebhe, 1988 (the English translation of the memoirs translated (with S. H. Amin) and edited and annotated, together with an 81-page introduction by Homa Katouzian).
- The Political Economy of Modern Iran (hb&pb), London and New York: Macmillan and New York University Press, 1981.
- Ideology and Method in Economics (hb&pb), London and New York: Macmillan and New York University Press, 1980.

Books in Persian

- Iran under the Pahlavi Monarchy, Tehran, Shahab-e Saqeb, first impression 2025, second impression, 2025.
- Politics, Society, Literature, Tehran, Morvarid, first impression 2025, second impression 2025.
- Hedayat's The Blind Owl (a critical monograph), 11th impression, Nashr-e Makaz, October 2025.
- Sadeq Hedayat and the Death of the Author, Tehran: Nashr-e Markaz, 9th impression, 2025; (first edition, 1993).
- Taghut and Yaqut Were Both Women, 16 Short Stories, London, ed., Saeed Barzin, 2025, exclusively sold by Amazon.
- A Song of Innocence, the first book of Homa Katouzian's poems, Tehran: Nashr-e Markaz, second edition, fourth impression, 2025.
- Sadeq Hedayat, The life and legend of an Iranian Writer, second Persian edition.7th impression, Nashr-e Markaz, April 2025.
- Fourteen Essays on Literature, Society, Philosophy and Economics, چهارده مقاله در ادبیات اجتماع، فلسفه و اقتصاد ، August 2024:
- Sa‘di the Poet of Love and Life, August 2024:
- “Golchin-e Sa‘di”, electronic edition, August 2024:
- Sadeq Hedayat and Death of the Author”, electronic edition, May 2024:"
- A Few Leaves from the Book of My Life, November 2023:
- That Verse Was Delayed, I Told Her, the second book of Homa Katouzian’s poetry’s second electronic edition: December 2023
- What is History, E.book edition, November 2023:
- What is History, E.book edition, September 2023:
- Sa’di in Love, electronic edition, May 2024:
- On Hedayat’s The Blind owl, electronic edition, May 2024:
- Fourteen Essays on Literature, Society, Philosophy and Economics, September 2023:
- Sadeq Hedayat and the Death of the Author, E.book edition, July 2023:
- Hedayat's The Blind Owl (a critical monograph), E.book edition, June 2023:
- Sadeq Hedayat, The Life and Legend of an Iranian Writer electronic edition, 2023.
- That Verse Was Delayed, I Told Her, the second book of Homa Katouzian’s poetry electronic edition, 2023
- .Sadeq Hedayat, The Life and Legend of an Iranian Writer, tr. Firuzeh Mohajer, Tehran: Nashr-e Markaz, second Persian edition, 2019, 7th impression,2025.
- Sa'di, Tehran: Nashr-e Markaz 7th impression, 2025 (first edition 2006)
- Hedayat's The Blind Owl (a critical monograph), 11th impression, Nashr-e Markaz, October 2025.
- Taghut and Yaqut Were Both Women, 16 Short Stories, sold exclusively by Amazon, 2025.
- Sadeq Hedayat, The life and legend of an Iranian Writer, second Persian edition. 7th impression, Nashr-e Markaz, April 2025
- Fourteen Essays on Literature, Society, Philosophy and Economics, چهارده مقاله در ادبیات اجتماع، فلسفه و اقتصاد, August 2024.
- Sa'di the Poet of Love and Life, August 2024. "Golchin-e Sa'di", electronic edition, August 2024.
- "Sadeq Hedayat and Death of the Author", electronic edition, May 2024.
- What is History, Tehran: Nash-e Markaz, first edition, January 2023.
- A Few Leaves from the Book of My Life, Tehran: Nashr-e Markaz, 2nd impression, 2021 (first edition, 2020).
- Nine Essays on the Historical Sociology of Iran, etc., tr. Alireza Tayyeb, Tehran: Nashr-e Markaz; 9th impression 2021 (first edition, 1998).
- Sa'di in Love, The Lyrics of Persia's Master Poet, Tehran: Nashr-e Markaz, 4th impression 2021; (first edition, 2017).
- The Political Economy of Modern Iran, trs. M. Nafissi and K. Azizi, together with a long new introduction by the author, Tehran: Nashr-e Markaz, 25th impression, 2020 (second, enlarged, edition 1993; first edition, 1988).
- State and Society in Iran: The Eclipse of the Qajar and the Emergence of the Pahlavis, tr. Hasan Afshar, Tehran: Nashr-e Markaz, 11th impression, 2020 (first edition, 2001).
- Fourteen Essays on Literature, Society, Philosophy and Economics (some of them translated from the English), 3rd impression, Tehran: Nashr-e Markaz, 2020 (first edition, 1995).
- Hedayat's The Blind Owl (a critical monograph), Tehran: Nashr-e Markaz, 9th impression, 2020 (first edition, 1995).
- Sadeq Hedayat and the Death of the Author, Tehran: Nashr-e Markaz, 7th impression, 2018; (first edition, 1993).
- Adam Smith and the Wealth of Nations (an abridged translation and with 100-page introduction), Tehran: Amir Kabir, seventh impression, 2019 (first edition, 1979).
- History, Culture, Politics, selected essays, ed. Mohamad Sadeqi, Tehran: Enteshar, third impression, 2019 (first edition, 2017).
- Musaddiq and the Struggle for Power in Iran, tr. Farzaneh Taheri edition, Tehran: Nashr-e Markaz, 4th impression 2018 (first edition 1994).
- Eight Essays on Contemporary History and Literature, Tehran: Nashr-e Markaz, 4th impression 2018 (first edition, 2006).
- Sadeq Hedayat and the Death of the Author, Tehran: Nashr-e Markaz, 7th impression, 2018; (first edition, 1993).
- Iran, The Short-Term Society and three other essays, tr. Abdollah Kowsari, Tehran Nashr-e Ney, 13th impression, 2018; (first edition), 2012.
- Sa'di, the Poet of Love, Life and Compassion, tr. Kazem Firuzmand, Tehran: Namak, 2016.
- Essays in Memory of Khalil Maleki (co-edited with Amir Pichdad), Tehran: Enteshar, 2016.
- Satire and Irony in The Works of Sadeq Hedayat, second edition, Tehran: Pardis-e Danesh, 2016; Toronto: Ketab-e Iran Nameh, 2015.
- The Political Memoirs of Khalil Maleki (Maleki's manuscript, edited and with a 250-page introduction), Tehran: Enteshar, 4th impression 2015 (second edition, 1988).
- Searching for the Long-Term Society, ed., Karim Arghandehpour, Tehran: Nashr-e Ney, 2014 (second impression, 2014).
- That Verse Was Delayed, I Told Her, the second book of Homa Katouzian's poetry, Tehran: Nashr-e Markaz, 2014.
- A Song of Innocence, the first book of Homa Katouzian's poems, Tehran: Nashr-e Markaz, third impression, 2014 (second enlarged edition 2004; first edition, 1997).
- Iran, The Short-Term Society and other essays, tr. Abdollah Kowsari, Tehran: Nashr-e Ney, 5th impression 2014 (first edition, 2012).
- The Dialectic of State and Society in Iran, tr. Alireza Tayyeb, Tehran: Nashr- e Ney, 11th impression, 2014 (first edition 2002).
- Ahmad Kasravi's The Revolt of Sheykh Mohammad Khiyabani (Kasravi's unpublished manuscript, edited and annotated, and with an 82-page introduction) Tehran: Nashr-e Markaz, fourth impression, 2014 (first edition, 1997).
- Democracy, Arbitrary Rule and the Popular Movement of Iran, 6th impression, Tehran: Nashr-e Markaz, 2014 (first editions, Nashr-e Markaz. 1993, and London and Washington: Mehregan, 1993).
- Jamalzadeh and His Literature, second edition, Tehran: Sokhan, 2011 (first edition, Tehran: Shahab, 2003).
- Golchin-e Sa'di: Golestan, Ghazal-ha, Bustan, Qasideh-ha, Tehran: Nashr-e Markaz, 2009.
- Khalil Maleki's Letters, ed. (with Amir Pichdad), Tehran: Nashr-e Markaz, 2003.
- Satire and Irony in Hedayat, Stockholm: Arash, 2003.
- Iran Nameh, guest ed. Special Issue on Seyyed Hasan Taqizadeh, 21, 1&2, spring and summer 2003.
- Khalil Maleki's The Clash of Ideas, edited with an introduction (with Amir Pichdad), Tehran: Nashr-e Markaz, 2nd 1997 (first edition, 1995).
- Ideology and Method in Economics, tr. M. Qa'ed, Tehran: Nashr-e Markaz, 1995.
- Universities and Higher Education Today (Persian translation of Herbert Butterfield's book and with a 25-page introduction), second edition, Tehran: Teacher Training University, 1978; first edition, Shiraz: Pahlavi University Press, 1974.
- International Economic Theory (an advanced textbook), Tehran: Tehran University Press, 1973.
