= Abu Bakr ibn Sa'd =

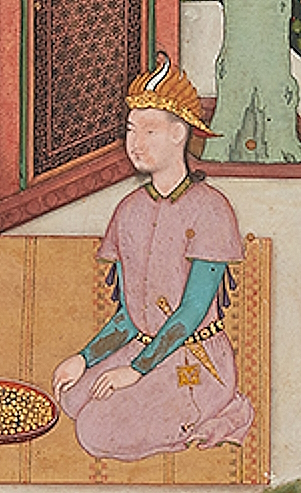
- Abu Bakr ibn Sa'd seated. Made in Mughal India, dated 1604

Atabeg of Fars
- Reign: 1226 – 18 May 1260
- Predecessor: Sa'd I
- Successor: Sa'd II
- Died: 18 May 1260
- Issue: Sa'd II
- Dynasty: Salghurids
- Father: Sa'd I
- Religion: Sunni Islam

Abu Bakr ibn Sa'd (Persian: اتابک مظفرالدین ابوبکر بن سعد بن زنگی), also known as Muzaffar al-Din Qutlugh Khan, was the Salghurid atabeg (ruler) of Fars from 1226 to 1260. He was the son and successor of Sa'd I.

== Background ==
Since 1148, the southern Iranian region of Fars had been ruled by the Turkoman Salghurid dynasty. Abu Bakr was the son of Sa'd I (r. 1198–1226), the Salghurid atabeg (ruler) of Fars. Before his succession to the throne, Abu Bakr attempted to seize power by rebelling in Shiraz against his father during the latter's conflict with two princes of the Khwarazmian Empire. He was, however, defeated by local troops and imprisoned. Just before his father's death on 5 November 1226, Abu Bakr was released and subsequently became the new atabeg.

== Reign ==
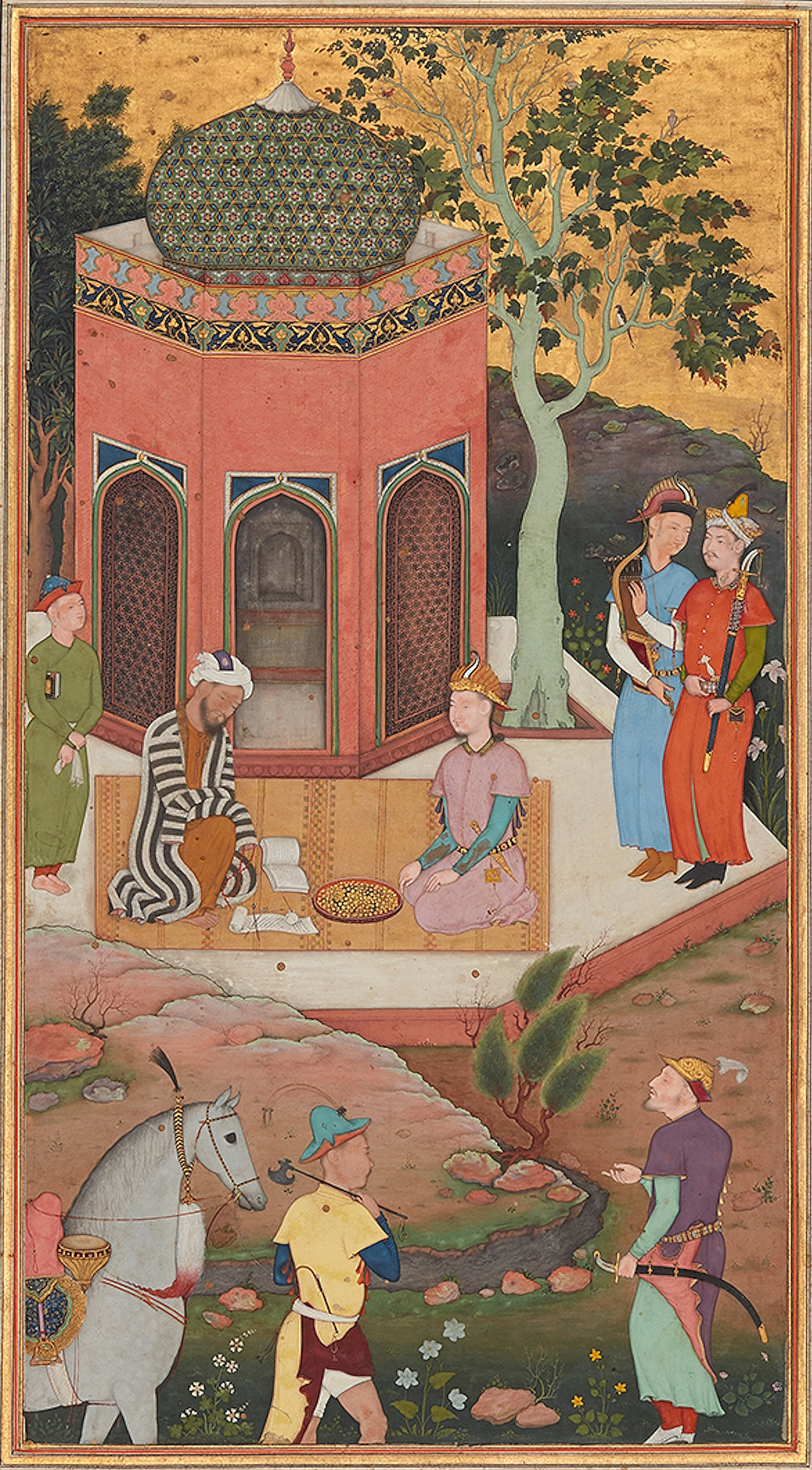
Folio depicting Abu Bakr ibn Sa'd (seated right) and the Persian poet Saadi Shirazi (seated left). Made in Mughal India, dated 1604

On 12 November 1230, Abu Bakr captured the Kish Island, thus giving him access to the trade between the Persian Gulf and India, where he could enforce dues on it. In August 1236, Abu Bakr seized the islands of Bahrayn, which was officially part of the Abbasid Caliphate. This resulted in a long struggle against its Arab inhabitants.

Following the occupation of northern Iran and Baghdad by Ilkhanid ruler Hulagu Khan (r. 1256–1265), Abu Bakr declared his allegiance to him by sending his son Sa'd II to the Mongol court at Baghdad. During Sa'd II's assignment, Abu Bakr died, on 18 May 1260. Sa'd II thus succeeded him, but died en route at Tafresh due to illness after ruling for twelve or eighteen days.

According to the modern historian John Limbert, Abu Bakr's death marked the start of the decline of the Salghurids, as his successors were either "drunkards, braggarts, or children," contrary to the previous "harsh and tough-minded Salghurid rulers."

== Court culture and local traditions ==
Abu Bakr was highly interested in learning, and had a circle of scholars and artists such as Saadi Shirazi (died 1291/92), who resided at his court. Saadi used his pen name in admiration of Abu Bakr, and also dedicated his first major work to the latter, the Bustan. During this period, culture flourished in Fars; Abu Bakr ordered the construction of many hospitals and high-level religious establishments which attracted many scholars.

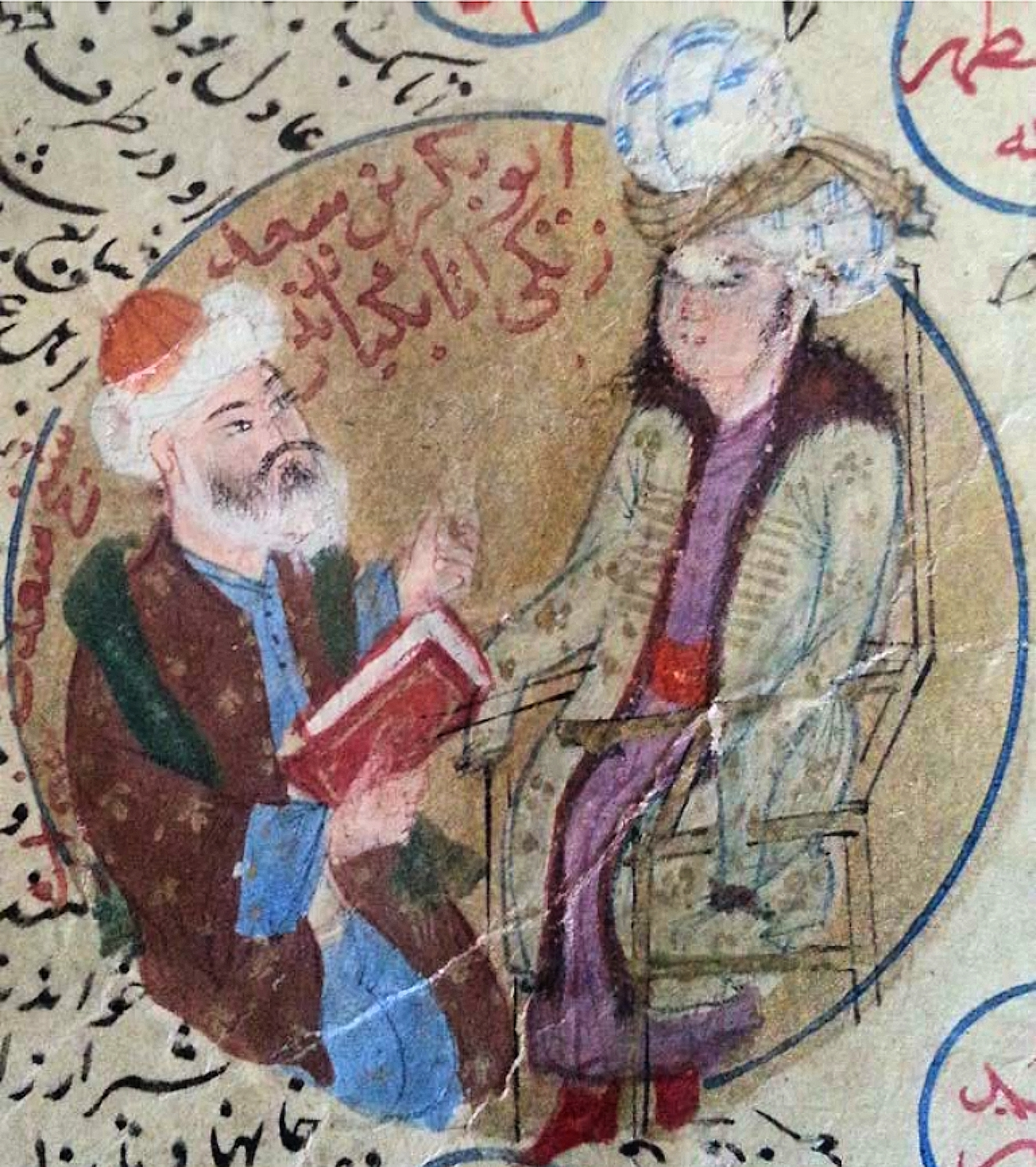
The poet Saadi Shirazi with enthroned Atabeg Abu Bakr ibn Sa'd. Cemʿ-i Tārīh, Museum of Ethnography, Ankara, No. 8457.

According to local traditions, Abu Bakr's minister Amir Muqarrab al-Din Mas'ud discovered the burial place of Ahmad, a brother of the eight Imam Ali al-Ridha (died 818). He was identified by the seal ring he wore. Consequently, the locals saw light emerging from a hill, where they allegedly found the burial place of Ahmad's brother Husayn. Abu Bakr had the hill dug, where they found an unscathed body holding a Quran and a sword.

== Sources ==
- Ibrahim, Lutpi (1979). "Al-Baydāwī's Life and Works". Islamic Studies. 18: 311–321. JSTOR 20847119. (registration required)
- Kamola, Stefan (2019). Making Mongol History Rashid al-Din and the Jamiʿ al-Tawarikh. Edinburgh University Press. ISBN 978-1474421423.
- Limbert, John (2004). Shiraz in the Age of Hafez. University of Washington Press. ISBN 978-0295983912.
- Spuler, B. (1983). "Abū Bakr b. Saʿd". In Yarshater, Ehsan (ed.). Encyclopædia Iranica. Vol. I/3: Ablution, Islamic–Abū Manṣūr Heravı̄. London and New York: Routledge & Kegan Paul. p. 261. ISBN 978-0-71009-092-8.
- Spuler, B. (1987). "Atābakān-e Fārs". In Yarshater, Ehsan (ed.). Encyclopædia Iranica. Vol. II/8: Aśoka IV–Āṯār al-Wozarāʾ. London and New York: Routledge & Kegan Paul. pp. 894–896. ISBN 978-0-71009-108-6.
- Taner, Melis (2020). "Illustrated Manuscripts Attributed to Baghdad". Caught in a whirlwind: a cultural history of Ottoman Baghdad as reflected in its illustrated manuscripts. Leiden; Boston: Brill. ISBN 978-9004412699.
