= Sa'd II =

Salghurid ruler of Fars (c. 1260)

Sa'd II was the Salghurid atabeg (ruler) of Fars briefly in 1260. While he was returning from an attendance with the Ilkhanate, his father Abu Bakr ibn Sa'd (r. 1226–1260) died. Sa'd II thus succeeded him, but died en route at Tafresh due to illness. He was succeeded by his young son Muhammad I ibn Sa'd.

== Sources ==
- Limbert, John (2004). Shiraz in the Age of Hafez. University of Washington Press. ISBN 978-0295983912.
- Spuler, B. (1987). "Atābakān-e Fārs". In Yarshater, Ehsan (ed.). Encyclopædia Iranica. Vol. II/8: Aśoka IV–Āṯār al-Wozarāʾ. London and New York: Routledge & Kegan Paul. pp. 894–896. ISBN 978-0-71009-108-6.
