= Music of the Spheres (disambiguation) =

Music of the Spheres or Musica universalis is an ancient philosophical concept that regards proportions in the movements of celestial bodies as a form of music.

Music of the Spheres may also refer to:

== Literature ==
- Music of the Spheres, a Star Trek novel by Margaret Wander Bonanno which was rewritten and published under the title Probe
- Music of the Spheres, a book written by Guy Murchie, originally published in 1961

== Music ==
=== Albums ===
- A Coldplay project:
  - Music of the Spheres Vol. I: From Earth with Love, 2021, or its title track
  - Music of the Spheres Vol. II: Moon Music, 2024
  - Music of the Spheres World Tour, a 2022 concert tour promoting the albums
- Music of the Spheres (Ian Brown album), 2001
- Music of the Spheres (Mike Oldfield album), 2008
- Music of the Spheres, a 2011 vinyl box set by The 13th Floor Elevators

=== Songs and compositions ===
- Music of the Spheres (German Sphärenklänge), a waltz by Josef Strauss, 1868
- Music of the Spheres (Langgaard), a 1918 composition for soprano, chorus and orchestra by Rued Langgaard
- Music of the Spheres, a 1938 composition for electronic instruments by Johanna Beyer
- Music of the Spheres, a 2004 composition for brass band by Philip Sparke
- Music of the Spheres and Music of the Spheres 2 (Incendiary Lemons), two 2011 compositions by Mike Morasky for the Portal 2 soundtrack
- "Music of the Spheres" (Destiny), a 2013 composition by Marty O’Donnell, Michael Salvatori and Paul McCartney for the video game Destiny

== Films ==
- Coldplay – Music of the Spheres: Live at River Plate, 2023

== Television ==
- "Music of the Spheres" (Doctor Who), a 2008 mini-episode of Doctor Who made for The Proms
- "Music of the Spheres" (The Outer Limits), a 1997 episode of The Outer Limits
- "Music of the Spheres" (Touch), an episode of Touch
- "Music of the Spheres", an episode of Clangers
- "Music of the Spheres," an episode of The Ascent of Man
