= Apple Martin =

American socialite (born 2004)

- Born: Apple Blythe Alison Martin; 14 May 2004 (age 22); London, England
- Citizenship: United Kingdom; United States
- Education: Vanderbilt University
- Occupations: Media personality; model
- Years active: 2006–present
- Parents: Chris Martin (father); Gwyneth Paltrow (mother)
- Relatives: Brad Falchuk (stepfather); Blythe Danner (grandmother); Bruce Paltrow (grandfather); Jake Paltrow (uncle)

Apple Blythe Alison Martin (born 14 May 2004) is an English-American socialite. She is the daughter of singer Chris Martin of Coldplay and actress Gwyneth Paltrow.

== Early life and education ==
Apple Blythe Alison Martin was born in London on 14 May 2004, to Chris Martin and Gwyneth Paltrow. She has a younger brother, Moses Bruce Paltrow Martin (born 8 April 2006). Her maternal grandmother is actress Blythe Danner. Her parents divorced in 2016.

Apple Martin attracted media attention within hours of her birth due to her unique name. Coldplay released a song titled "I Am Your Baby's Daddy" under the name "The Nappies" in anticipation of her birth. The inspiration behind the band's 2005 single "Speed of Sound" was Chris Martin becoming a father. Actor Simon Pegg and Coldplay guitarist Jonny Buckland are her godfathers.

Martin graduated from Crossroads School in Santa Monica, California in 2022. She attended Vanderbilt University in Nashville, beginning in September 2022, where she is a member of the Kappa Kappa Gamma sorority. She made her society debut at the Le Bal des Débutantes in Paris on 30 November 2024, wearing a custom blue Valentino gown.

== Public life ==
Martin made her television debut at the age of two, in the third episode in the third season of the VH1 series VH1: All Access. The episode, "20 Cutest Celebrity Babies", was broadcast on 7 November 2006. She appeared in the fourth episode of the Netflix documentary series The Goop Lab. The episode, "The Health-Span Plan", was released on 24 January 2020.

Martin attended her first fashion show at Chanel's fashion show at Paris Fashion Week in Paris, on 24 January 2023. She has been credited as a songwriter on the Coldplay single "feelslikeimfallinginlove", from the band's tenth studio album, Moon Music. She also contributed to the songs "Let Somebody Go" and "One World".
