= Coldplay – Music of the Spheres: Live at River Plate =

2023 concert film by Coldplay

- Theatrical release poster
- Directed by: Paul Dugdale
- Based on: Music of the Spheres World Tour
- Produced by: Simon Fisher; Sam Seager
- Starring: Guy Berryman; Jonny Buckland; Will Champion; Chris Martin
- Cinematography: Brett Turnbull
- Edited by: Simon Bryant
- Music by: Coldplay
- Production companies: SiFi Films; Infinity Station Films
- Distributed by: Trafalgar Releasing
- Release date: 19 April 2023
- Running time: 138 minutes
- Country: United Kingdom
- Language: English
- Box office: $8.4 million

Coldplay – Music of the Spheres: Live at River Plate, often referred to as simply Live at River Plate, is a concert film documenting a 2022 performance by British rock band Coldplay during their Music of the Spheres World Tour. Directed by Paul Dugdale, produced by Simon Fisher and Sam Seager, and distributed by Trafalgar Releasing, it was originally transmitted to cinemas in 81 countries under the title Live Broadcast from Buenos Aires, setting a record for live theatrical events. The final version of the project was released on 19 April 2023 and marked the launch of Infinity Station Films, Coldplay's newfound production company.

== Development ==
=== Background ===
A day before the release of Music of the Spheres (2021), Coldplay announced they would be embarking on their eighth concert tour to promote the album, consequently marking their return to live entertainment after the COVID-19 pandemic. On 8 September 2022, the band revealed Live Broadcast from Buenos Aires, a global transmission of one of their 10 shows at Estadio River Plate, Argentina. It was the first worldwide event in history to be screened from Latin America. Direction was handled by Paul Dugdale and distribution by Trafalgar Releasing, which premiered Coldplay: A Head Full of Dreams back in 2018.

=== Release ===
On 1 March 2023, Coldplay declared that a director's cut named Coldplay – Music of the Spheres: Live at River Plate would be released in the upcoming months. This updated version of the film included visuals captured using 30 cameras, racing drones and 360-degree techniques. Variety also informed that the sound was remastered and there was an exclusive behind-the-scenes extra. Similarly, the guest appearances from H.E.R., Golshifteh Farahani, and Jin were maintained. Screenings first occurred on 19 and 23 April, with panoramic and 4DX formats available in addition to the standard ones. To further promote them, the "A Sky Full of Stars" performance was published on YouTube. On 11 May 2024, Live Nation streaming platform Veeps began to rent out the film.

== Reception ==
=== Box office ===
The original broadcast grossed $8.4 million over the weekend. Screenings were hosted in cinemas from 81 countries, breaking the record for a live theatrical release. Chart peaks worldwide include number one in Argentina, Chile, Mexico and the Netherlands; number two in Brazil, Germany and Italy; number three in Spain and the United Kingdom; and number 10 in Australia. IndieWire's Tom Brueggemann mentioned that the transmission would have reached number nine in the United States if non-movies were counted, since it drew more than $1 million in revenue from 833 theaters. CJ 4DPlex highlighted the definitive cut among the releases that contributed to a 70% increase in its ticket sales.

=== Reviews ===
Writing for MadMass, Mattia Salvi described the show as engaging and "technically impeccable", praising Coldplay for their musical versatility. He then concluded the review giving four stars out of five to the concert film. Movieplayer's Federico Vascotto said that the performance was a psychedelic, hyper-dynamic and breathtaking experience made to "turn heads in the cinema", rating it with three and a half stars out of five. His criticism was most prominent towards the behind-the-scenes segment, which he pointed out it should have been more detailed and interesting, since much content "was left between the lines". Nevertheless, Vascotto called the film a great gift for fans of the band.

== Film set list ==
This set list was taken from the 28 October 2022 concert in Buenos Aires, Argentina. It does not represent all shows throughout the tour.

1. "Flying" (from E.T. the Extra-Terrestrial)
2. "Music of the Spheres" (intro)
3. "Higher Power"
4. "Adventure of a Lifetime"
5. "Paradise"
6. "The Scientist" (with elements of "Oceans")
7. "Viva la Vida"
8. "Hymn for the Weekend"
9. "Let Somebody Go" (with H.E.R.)
10. "De Música Ligera" (Soda Stereo cover)
11. "Yellow" (with elements of "Neon Forest")
12. "Human Heart"
13. "People of the Pride"
14. "Clocks"
15. "Infinity Sign" (with elements of "Music of the Spheres II" and "Every Teardrop Is a Waterfall")
16. "Something Just Like This" (performed in American Sign Language)
17. "Midnight" (with elements of Lone's "Blue Moon Tree")
18. "My Universe"
19. "A Sky Full of Stars"
20. "Don't Panic"
21. "Baraye" (Shervin Hajipour cover with Golshifteh Farahani)
22. "Sunrise" (with Louis Armstrong's speech from "What a Wonderful World")
23. "Humankind"
24. "Fix You"
25. "The Astronaut" (with Jin)
26. "Biutyful"
27. "A Wave" (outro)

== See also ==
- List of British films of 2023
- List of highest-grossing concert films
