= Feelslikeimfallinginlove =

2024 single by Coldplay

Single by Coldplay

from the album Moon Music
- Released: 21 June 2024
- Recorded: 2023
- Genre: Pop rock; soft rock
- Length: 3:56
- Label: Parlophone; Atlantic
- Songwriters: Guy Berryman; Jonny Buckland; Will Champion; Chris Martin; Apple Martin; Max Martin; Jon Hopkins; Tim Rutili
- Producers: Max Martin; Oscar Holter; Bill Rahko; Daniel Green; Michael Ilbert

Coldplay singles chronology
"Let Somebody Go" (2022)	"Feelslikeimfallinginlove" (2024)	"We Pray" (2024)

Music video
- "Feelslikeimfallinginlove" on YouTube

"Feelslikeimfallinginlove" (stylised in all lowercase) is a song by British rock band Coldplay. It was released on 21 June 2024 through Parlophone in the United Kingdom and Atlantic in the United States. Written by all members of the band—along with Max Martin, Jon Hopkins and Apple Martin—the track samples Tim Rutili's "Funeral Singers" and was the lead single for their tenth studio album, Moon Music. PPL ranked it as the tenth-most played song of the year on radio and television in the United Kingdom, the highest placement for a band on their chart. "Feelslikeimfallinginlove" was also nominated for Song of the Year at the Brit Awards 2025.

== Background and composition ==
On 13 June 2024, Coldplay announced through their social media profiles that the song would be released on 21 June. The song was written by the band members and produced by Max Martin, Oscar Holter, Bill Rahko, Daniel Green and Michael Ilbert. It also samples "Funeral Singers", as performed by Sylvan Esso and written by Tim Rutili.

== Critical reception ==
=== Reviews ===
"Feelslikeimfallinginlove" received generally positive reviews from music critics. Andrew Unterberger from Billboard described the song as "Coldplay generally doing what they do best: love songs with moody verses and blood-rush choruses that you can remember after a single listen". Stereogum's Chris DeVille wrote "Despite the involvement of a pop mastermind like Max Martin, who also worked on 2021's crossover-minded Music of the Spheres, [it] comes off a bit more like mid-2000s imperial Coldplay with a bit more sparkle". Writing for Uproxx, Derrick Rossignol praised the work as a "lush and uplifting number".

=== Rankings ===
List of critic rankings
Publication	Description	Result	Ref.
3voor12	Songs of the Year 2024	48	
Amazon Music	Best Songs of 2024	33	
Apple Music	The 50 Best Songs of 2024	33	
Deezer	The 20 Best Songs of 2024	5	
Phoenix FM	32 Best Songs of 2024	Placed	

== Accolades ==
List of awards and nominations
Year	Ceremony	Category	Result	Ref.
2024	Ciclope Festival	Music Video – Animation	Nominated	
2024	LIAF Awards	Audience Voting – Music Video	Won	
2024	Los 40 Music Awards	International Song of the Year	Nominated	
2024	MTV Video Music Awards	Best Rock Video	Nominated	
2024	MTV Video Music Awards	Video for Good	Nominated	
2024	RTHK International Pop Poll Awards	Top 10 International Gold Songs	Won	
2024	UK Music Video Awards	Best Pop Video	Nominated	
2024	UK Music Video Awards	Best Animation in a Video	Won	
2025	Anibar Animation Festival	Animated Music Video	Won	
2025	Annie Awards	Best Sponsored	Nominated	
2025	Berlin Music Video Awards	Best Animation (Blinkink)	Won	
2025	Brit Awards	Song of the Year	Nominated	
2025	Hito Music Awards	Western Song of the Year	Won	
2025	Music Awards Japan	Best International Rock Song in Japan	Won	

== Music video ==
Route of the music video for the Zerb remix at Yrjönkatu, Helsinki.

The music video for "Feelslikeimfallinginlove" was shot at the Odeon of Herodes Atticus in Athens, Greece. Local publications claimed that it had a budget of €3 million, ranking among the most expensive of all time. Footage was directed by Los Angeles-based director Ben Mor and released on 1 July 2024. It included Natasha Ofili and the Coro de Manos Blancas joining Coldplay to perform the song in American Sign Language. July is celebrated as Disability Pride Month. An animated lyric video produced by 15 different artists came out on 22 July. The song's Zerb remix has a video as well, filmed in the streets of Helsinki and released on 2 August.

== Live performances ==
On 16 June 2024, during the Music of the Spheres World Tour in Budapest, the band performed "Feelslikeimfallinginlove" for the first time ever in public. The band also performed the song at the Glastonbury Festival in Pilton, Somerset on 29 June 2024.

== Track listing ==
Digital single

1. "Feelslikeimfallinginlove" – 3:57

Digital (Zerb x Coldplay)

1. "Feelslikeimfallinginlove" (Zerb x Coldplay) – 3:56

== Personnel ==
Coldplay

- Chris Martin – vocals, keyboards, guitar
- Jonny Buckland – guitar
- Guy Berryman – bass
- Will Champion – drums, percussion, backing vocals

== Charts ==
=== Weekly charts ===
Weekly chart performance
Chart (2024–2025)	Peak position
Argentina Hot 100 (Billboard)	94
Argentina Airplay (Monitor Latino)	7
Australia (ARIA)	54
Austria (Ö3 Austria Top 40)	3
Belgium (Ultratop 50 Flanders)	6
Belgium (Ultratop 50 Wallonia)	6
Bolivia Airplay (Monitor Latino)	11
Brazil Airplay (Crowley Charts)	69
Canada Hot 100 (Billboard)	82
Canada CHR/Top 40 (Billboard)	36
Canada Hot AC (Billboard)	21
Central America (Monitor Latino)	6
CIS Airplay (TopHit)	50
Croatia International Airplay (Top lista)	2
Czech Republic Airplay (ČNS IFPI)	1
Estonia Airplay (TopHit)	2
Finland (Suomen virallinen lista)	34
France (SNEP)	66
Germany (GfK)	31
Global 200 (Billboard)	57
Greece International (IFPI)	23
Hungary (Editors' Choice Top 40)	8
Iceland (Tónlistinn)	28
Ireland (IRMA)	17
Italy (FIMI)	80
Italy Airplay (EarOne)	2
Japan Hot Overseas (Billboard Japan)	2
Latvia Airplay (LaIPA)	1
Lebanon (Lebanese Top 20)	3
Lithuania Airplay (TopHit)	10
Malta Airplay (Radiomonitor)	1
Netherlands (Dutch Top 40)	12
Netherlands (Single Top 100)	33
New Zealand (Recorded Music NZ)	17
New Zealand Hot Singles (RMNZ) Zerb remix	20
Norway (VG-lista)	36
Poland (Polish Airplay Top 100)	8
Portugal (AFP)	83
Romania Airplay (TopHit)	69
San Marino Airplay (SMRTV Top 50)	2
Serbia Airplay (Radiomonitor)	15
Slovakia Airplay (ČNS IFPI)	6
Slovakia Singles Digital (ČNS IFPI)	76
South Korea BGM (Circle)	70
South Korea Download (Circle)	87
Spain (PROMUSICAE)	82
Sweden (Sverigetopplistan)	73
Switzerland (Schweizer Hitparade)	19
Turkey International Airplay (Radiomonitor Türkiye)	2
United Arab Emirates (IFPI)	19
UK Singles (Official Charts)	16
US Billboard Hot 100	81
US Adult Contemporary (Billboard)	28
US Adult Pop Airplay (Billboard)	10
US Hot Rock & Alternative Songs (Billboard)	12
US Pop Airplay (Billboard)	26
US Rock & Alternative Airplay (Billboard)	11
Venezuela Airplay (Record Report)	43

=== Monthly charts ===
Monthly chart performance
Chart (2024)	Peak position
CIS Airplay (TopHit)	55
Czech Republic (Rádio – Top 100)	1
Estonia Airplay (TopHit)	5
Lithuania Airplay (TopHit)	11
Romania Airplay (TopHit)	73
Slovakia (Rádio Top 100)	8

=== Year-end charts ===
Year-end chart performance
Chart (2024)	Position
Belgium (Ultratop 50 Flanders)	43
Belgium (Ultratop 50 Wallonia)	67
CIS Airplay (TopHit)	191
Estonia Airplay (TopHit)	19
France Airplay (SNEP)	16
Iceland (Tónlistinn)	78
Italy Airplay (EarOne)	19
Netherlands (Dutch Top 40)	38
Poland (Polish Airplay Top 100)	53
Spain Airplay (PROMUSICAE)	17
US Hot Rock & Alternative Songs (Billboard)	73
Venezuela Rock (Record Report)	11

Chart (2025)	Position
Argentina Anglo Airplay (Monitor Latino)	44
Belgium (Ultratop 50 Flanders)	126

== Certifications ==
Certifications
Region	Certification	Certified units/sales
Australia (ARIA)	Platinum	70,000^{‡}
Austria (IFPI Austria)	Gold	15,000^{‡}
Canada (Music Canada)	Gold	40,000^{‡}
France (SNEP)	Platinum	200,000^{‡}
New Zealand (RMNZ)	Platinum	30,000^{‡}
Spain (Promusicae)	Gold	30,000^{‡}
Switzerland (IFPI Switzerland)	Gold	15,000^{‡}
United Kingdom (BPI)	Platinum	600,000^{‡}
^{‡} Sales+streaming figures based on certification alone.

== Release history ==
Release dates and formats
Region	Date	Format	Version	Label	Ref.
Various	21 June 2024	Digital download; streaming	Original	Parlophone; Atlantic	
Various	2 August 2024	Digital download; streaming	Zerb x Coldplay	Parlophone; Atlantic	
Italy	21 June 2024	Radio airplay	Original	Warner	

== See also ==
- List of number-one singles of 2024 (Spain)
- List of German airplay number-one songs of 2024
- List of top 10 singles in 2024 (France)
- List of number-one songs of the 2020s (Czech Republic)
