= List of German airplay number-one songs of 2024 =

The Official German Airplay Chart is an airplay chart compiled by Nielsen Music Control on behalf of Bundesverband Musikindustrie (Federal Association of Phonographic Industry).

== Chart history ==
Issue date	Title	Artist(s)	Ref.
5 January	"Houdini"	Dua Lipa	
12 January	"Overdrive"	Ofenbach featuring Norma Jean Martine	
19 January	"Houdini"	Dua Lipa	
26 January	"I'll Be There"	Robin Schulz, Rita Ora and Tiago PZK	
2 February	"Houdini"	Dua Lipa	
9 February	"Houdini"	Dua Lipa	
16 February	"Houdini"	Dua Lipa	
23 February	"Am I Enough"	Loi	
1 March	"Stumblin' In"	Cyril	
8 March	"Stumblin' In"	Cyril	
15 March	"Head Down"	Lost Frequencies and Bastille	
22 March	"Head Down"	Lost Frequencies and Bastille	
29 March	"Head Down"	Lost Frequencies and Bastille	
5 April	"Head Down"	Lost Frequencies and Bastille	
12 April	"Head Down"	Lost Frequencies and Bastille	
19 April	"Whatever"	Kygo and Ava Max	
26 April	"Whatever"	Kygo and Ava Max	
3 May	"Beat of Your Heart"	Purple Disco Machine and Àsdìs	
10 May	"Texas Hold 'Em"	Beyoncé	
17 May	"Texas Hold 'Em"	Beyoncé	
24 May	"Simple Life"	Leony	
31 May	"Simple Life"	Leony	
7 June	"Simple Life"	Leony	
14 June	"I Don't Wanna Wait"	David Guetta and OneRepublic	
21 June	"I Don't Wanna Wait"	David Guetta and OneRepublic	
28 June	"Belong Together"	Mark Ambor	
5 July	"Belong Together"	Mark Ambor	
12 July	"I Don't Wanna Wait"	David Guetta and OneRepublic	
19 July	"Espresso"	Sabrina Carpenter	
26 July	"Stargazing"	Myles Smith	
2 August	"Stargazing"	Myles Smith	
9 August	"Stargazing"	Myles Smith	
16 August	"Stargazing"	Myles Smith	
23 August	"Feelslikeimfallinginlove"	Coldplay	
30 August	"Feelslikeimfallinginlove"	Coldplay	
6 September	"Feelslikeimfallinginlove"	Coldplay	
13 September	"Feelslikeimfallinginlove"	Coldplay	
20 September	"Feelslikeimfallinginlove"	Coldplay	
27 September	"Feelslikeimfallinginlove"	Coldplay	
4 October	"Birds of a Feather"	Billie Eilish	
11 October	"Birds of a Feather"	Billie Eilish	
18 October	"Wave"	Fast Boy and Raf	
25 October	"Dancing in the Flames"	The Weeknd	
1 November	"Dancing in the Flames"	The Weeknd	
8 November	"Dancing in the Flames"	The Weeknd	
15 November	"Dancing in the Flames"	The Weeknd	
22 November	"Dancing in the Flames"	The Weeknd	
29 November	"Dancing in the Flames"	The Weeknd	
6 December	"Dancing in the Flames"	The Weeknd	
13 December	"Dancing in the Flames"	The Weeknd	
20 December	"Dancing in the Flames"	The Weeknd	
27 December	"Forever Young"	David Guetta, Alphaville and Ava Max	
