= Let Somebody Go =

2022 single by Coldplay and Selena Gomez

Single by Coldplay and Selena Gomez

from the album Music of the Spheres
- Released: 7 February 2022
- Recorded: 2019–2021
- Genre: Pop; soft rock
- Length: 3:32 (single version); 4:01 (album version); 4:09 (piano version); 3:17 (Kygo remix); 3:14 (Ofenbach remix)
- Label: Parlophone; Atlantic
- Songwriters: Guy Berryman; Jonny Buckland; Will Champion; Chris Martin; Max Martin; Olivia Waithe; Oscar Holter; Leland Wayne; Bill Rahko
- Producers: Max Martin; Oscar Holter; Rik Simpson; Jon Hopkins; Daniel Green; Bill Rahko; Metro Boomin

Coldplay singles chronology
"My Universe" (2021)	"Let Somebody Go" (2022)	"Feelslikeim fallinginlove" (2024)

Selena Gomez singles chronology
"999" (2021)	"Let Somebody Go" (2022)	"Calm Down" (remix) (2022)

Music video
- "Let Somebody Go" on YouTube

"Let Somebody Go" is a song by British rock band Coldplay and American singer Selena Gomez, recorded for the band's ninth studio album, Music of the Spheres. It was produced by Max Martin, Oscar Holter, Rik Simpson, Daniel Green and Bill Rahko, with additional production by Metro Boomin. Parlophone released the track as the third single from Music of the Spheres on 7 February 2022 on digital download and streaming platforms. Because the album was nominated for Album Of The Year at 65th Annual Grammy Awards, Selena Gomez received a second nomination as a featured artist thanks to her contribution on that project.

== Writing and production ==
Creative director Phil Harvey stated both him and Martin have been fans of Gomez, commenting she has a "unique, evocative and mysterious" tone. He initially tried to persuade the band to include the song in their eighth album Everyday Life (2019). Meanwhile, Martin noted "she's an angel" and her voice is in what he "would call 'the Rihanna bag' which are voices that are gifts to humanity". Bassist Guy Berryman explained the collaboration:

"This is just a really lovely ballad. And quite early on we realized it needed a female counterpart to the vocal." He added, "And we were very grateful that when we asked Selena to sing on it, she loved the song and was happy to do so. Collaborations in general are something that we've done more of recently. We never really used to do it before. When we were younger, we kind of locked ourselves in a room and felt we had to prove everything ourselves. But I think as time has gone on, it's become more interesting for us to work with other people from different parts of the world, different genres. It just adds color and character to the music".

They finished the track together in April 2021. The song features lyrics written by Apple Martin, daughter of frontman Chris Martin and Gwyneth Paltrow; the father stated that Apple "gave me this amazing chord that I'd never thought of. So she's on there".

== Music video ==
A space-themed lyric video featuring animated handwritten lyrics was released on 15 October 2021. The video was directed by Pilar Zeta and Victor Scorrano and depicts Calypso, one of the celestial bodies in the fictional solar system The Spheres. A music video directed by Dave Meyers was announced on 3 February 2022, and was released on 7 February 2022. The music video was filmed in October 2021.

== Live performances ==
"Let Somebody Go" was first performed live on The Late Late Show with James Corden by Coldplay and Selena Gomez on the show's 18 October 2021 episode. On 2 February 2022, Chris Martin performed a solo version of the song on The Ellen DeGeneres Show. On 1 November 2022, Coldplay performed the song together with Argentine singer Tini, at Estadio River Plate during their Music of the Spheres World Tour. On 4 October 2023, Coldplay & Selena Gomez performed the song at the Rose Bowl.

== Critical reception ==
"Let Somebody Go" received positive reviews by most critics, who considered it a highlight for the album. Jon Dolan from Rolling Stone called it a "soft-focus study in post-breakup solemnity that's got more warmth and grace than most artists' crushed-out valentines". The track was also named one of the best songs of the year by Aftonbladet (#24), as they cited it as a "delicious music with only one signal: Chris Martin's habit of writing howling and presumptuous arena signs". Similarly, Cosmopolitan included it on their "55 Best Songs of 2021" list at number 21 and mentioned the collaboration was "unexpectedly awesome". The New York Post, on the other hand, ranked "Let Somebody Go" as the fifth worst song of 2021, considering it the anti-"Yellow".

== Accolades ==
List of awards and nominations
Year	Organization	Category	Result	Ref.
2022	BreakTudo Awards	Best International Video	Nominated	
2022	NRJ Music Awards	International Video of the Year	Nominated	
2022	People's Choice Awards	The Music Video of 2022	Nominated	
2022	RTHK International Pop Poll Awards	Top 10 International Gold Songs	Nominated	
2023	Art Directors Guild Awards	Short Format: Webseries or Music Video (François Audouy)	Nominated	

== Personnel ==
Coldplay

- Guy Berryman – bass
- Jonny Buckland – guitar
- Will Champion – drums
- Chris Martin – vocals, keyboards, acoustic guitar

Additional musicians

- Selena Gomez – vocals

Technical personnel

- Max Martin – programming, production
- Oscar Holter – programming, production
- Rik Simpson – additional production
- Jon Hopkins – production
- Daniel Green – production
- Bill Rahko – production

== Charts ==
Weekly chart performance
Chart (2021–2023)	Peak position
Australia (ARIA)	66
Austria (Ö3 Austria Top 40)	69
Canada Hot 100 (Billboard)	45
Czech Republic Singles Digital (ČNS IFPI)	78
France (SNEP)	115
Germany (GfK)	74
Global 200 (Billboard)	32
Hungary (Single Top 40)	34
Ireland (IRMA)	25
Italy Airplay (EarOne)	29
Japan Hot Overseas (Billboard)	19
Lithuania (AGATA)	40
Mexico Airplay (Billboard)	42
Mexico Ingles Airplay (Billboard)	8
Netherlands (Dutch Top 40 Tipparade)	21
Netherlands (Single Top 100)	53
New Zealand Hot Singles (RMNZ)	4
Norway (VG-lista)	19
Poland Airplay (ZPAV)	19
Portugal (AFP)	44
San Marino (SMRRTV Top 50)	21
Slovakia Airplay (ČNS IFPI)	74
Slovakia (Singles Digitál Top 100)	53
South Africa (RISA)	70
South Korea BGM (Gaon)	95
South Korea Download (Gaon)	94
Spain (Promusicae)	98
Sweden (Sverigetopplistan)	28
Switzerland (Schweizer Hitparade)	27
UK Singles (Official Charts)	24
US Billboard Hot 100	91
US Adult Pop Airplay (Billboard)	24
US Hot Rock & Alternative Songs (Billboard)	9

== Certifications ==
Certifications
Region	Certification	Certified units/sales
Brazil (Pro-Música Brasil)	Platinum	40,000^{‡}
France (SNEP)	Gold	100,000^{‡}
Italy (FIMI)	Gold	50,000^{‡}
New Zealand (RMNZ)	Gold	15,000^{‡}
Portugal (AFP)	Gold	5,000^{‡}
Spain (Promusicae)	Gold	30,000^{‡}
United Kingdom (BPI)	Silver	200,000^{‡}
^{‡} Sales+streaming figures based on certification alone.

== Release history ==
Release dates and formats
Country	Date	Format	Version	Label	Ref.
Various	7 February 2022	Digital download; streaming	Original	Parlophone; Atlantic	
Italy	11 February 2022	Radio airplay	Original	Warner	
United States	14 February 2022	Adult contemporary radio	Original	Atlantic	
Various	4 March 2022	Digital download; streaming	Single	Parlophone; Atlantic	
Various	11 March 2022	Digital download; streaming	Kygo remix	Parlophone; Atlantic	
Various	18 March 2022	Digital download; streaming	Piano	Parlophone; Atlantic	
Various	15 April 2022	Digital download; streaming	Ofenbach remix	Parlophone; Atlantic	
