= Music of the Spheres World Tour =

2022–2025 concert tour by Coldplay

- Tour by Coldplay
- Promotional poster
- Location: Asia; Europe; North America; South America; Oceania
- Associated albums: Music of the Spheres; Moon Music
- Start date: 18 March 2022
- No. of shows: 225
- Producer: Live Nation
- Attendance: 13.1 million
- Box office: $1.52 billion
- Website: coldplay.com/tour

Coldplay concert chronology
- A Head Full of Dreams Tour (2016–2017); Music of the Spheres World Tour (2022–2025); ...

The Music of the Spheres World Tour is the eighth concert tour undertaken by British rock band Coldplay. It is being staged to promote their ninth and tenth studio albums, Music of the Spheres (2021) and Moon Music (2024), respectively. The tour began at San José's Estadio Nacional de Costa Rica on 18 March 2022, paused at London's Wembley Stadium on 12 September 2025 and the band expect to restart in 2027. It marked their return to live performances after the COVID-19 pandemic, spanning 225 dates in 80 cities across 43 countries. They had not toured Everyday Life (2019) because of environmental concerns. A team of experts measured their CO_{2} emissions and devised strategies to reduce them over the following two years.

Coldplay announced the first shows on 14 October 2021, a day before Music of the Spheres was released. Similar to the Mylo Xyloto Tour (2011–2012), production elements involved pyrotechnics, confetti and lasers. However, adaptations were done to cut their carbon footprint. Other ideas included crafting the first rechargeable mobile show battery in the world with BMW and planting a tree for every ticket sold. Emissions fell by 59% in comparison to the group's previous tour, leading Time to rank Coldplay among the most influential climate action leaders. Pollstar stated that they have ushered in "a new era of sustainable touring".

With a global cultural impact, the Music of the Spheres World Tour grossed $1.52 billion in revenue from 13.1 million tickets, becoming the most-attended tour of all time and the first by a band to collect $1 billion. Coldplay also broke numerous venue records during the tour. The shows received widespread acclaim from music critics, who praised the group's stage presence, musicianship, versatility and joyfulness, as well as the overall production value. A concert film, Music of the Spheres: Live at River Plate, was released in cinemas around the world in 2023, featuring their performances in Buenos Aires.

== Background ==
Following the release of Coldplay's eighth studio album, Everyday Life (2019), lead singer and pianist Chris Martin told BBC News that the band would not tour until they could make shows more sustainable. The record was promoted through intimate charity events and a performance broadcast from the Amman Citadel via YouTube. A team of sustainability experts was commissioned to investigate their carbon footprint and reduce it over the next two years. On 14 October 2021, a day before Music of the Spheres came out, the group announced the first leg of the tour, officially marking their return to live performances after the COVID-19 pandemic. The statement was accompanied by a website that explained how Coldplay would tackle environmental issues across 12 fields, cutting emissions by half relative to the Head Full of Dreams Tour (2016–2017). Performances carried out before the trek included the inauguration of Climate Pledge Arena, as well as their Expo 2020 debut. San José was the first stop due to renewable energy in Costa Rica.

== Production ==
=== Stage, lighting and video ===
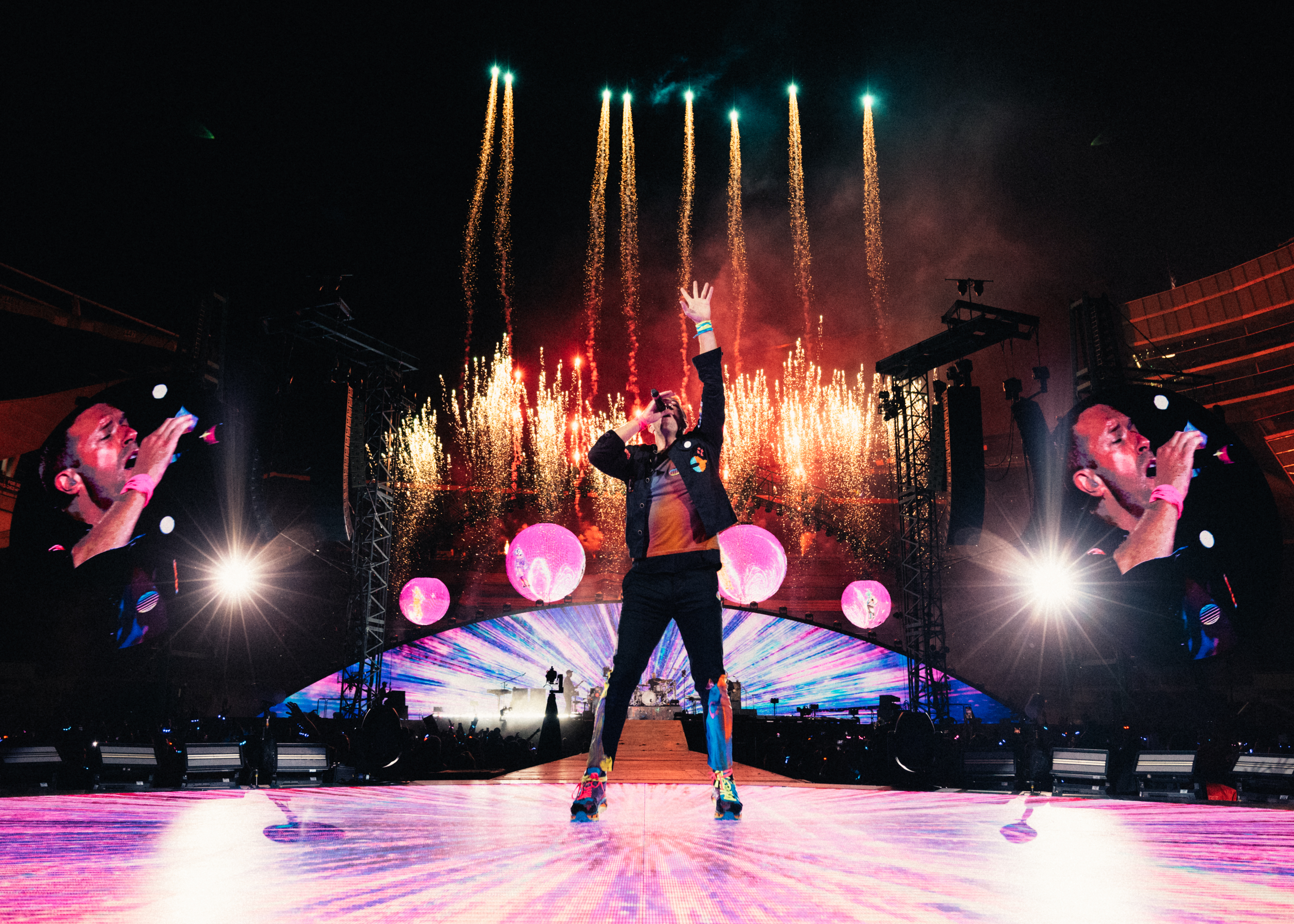
Coldplay adapted their stage and equipment to reduce the amount of resources needed to function

The stage was developed in a collaboration between production designer Misty Buckley and lighting designer Sooner Routhier, with Coldplay giving their own input in every aspect of the project. They were inspired by the musica universalis philosophy of ancient Greece, unfolding spherical patterns out from the stage in numerous directions. Other running concepts included "alien music festivals in space, love, people and togetherness". After turning her sketches into CAD drawings, Buckley made their layouts functional and decorated them with symbols from the tour's namesake album. The final design showed two 14-metre circular screens, four inflatable LED spheres and the Moonrise, an arched video wall spanning 44 metres wide and 6 metres high. ROE Visual and PRG Projects supplied the products.

For the ground structure, TAIT Towers built three round stages linked by runways. They were made of lightweight, reusable materials such as recycled steel, while the modular framework allowed Coldplay to make seamless transitions between areas and provide extra vantage points to watch them perform. Along with BMW, the band set up the first rechargeable mobile show battery in the world. It was powered by wind turbines installed on delay towers, solar blankets laid on empty seats and hydrotreated vegetable oil. Two kinetic floors and at least 15 stationary bicycles were arranged to interact with the public as well.

Maintaining their sustainability plans, Coldplay upgraded equipment to incorporate low-energy displays, lasers and lighting sets. Routhier acquired about 600 colour fixtures for the show through Upstaging, favouring IP65-rated products due to their weather resistance. Except for the spotlight system, all the gear was LED-based. Its pieces were suspended from pylons across the venue and fixed in circular configurations, reinforcing patterns with flowing movements. The band wanted to induce the feeling of moving through the seven chakras, leading Routhier to vaguely abide by their colours. In terms of video production, the stage hardware featured 26 cameras. Five were operated automatically and eight were placed near musical instruments. The digital media team created real-time visuals and effects using Notch. To broadcast footage, the camera crew obtained eight Disguise GX 2C servers and a Grass Valley Karrera 4 M/E switcher, while their Ereca Stage Racer 2 units granted control over audio and video signals on a single fiber.

=== Sound and special effects ===
Front of house duties were overseen by Dan Green and Tony Smith, who worked with Coldplay on their previous tour. They renewed the sound system and split the central control into unique racks for each band member, improving their flexibility and integration across departments. Green scaled down his outboard gear as well, extensively relying on effect plugins. The hangs, ground subs, front fills and delays were all supplied by d&b audiotechnik, totaling more than 200 speakers and 110 amplifiers. Products from both the J and SL series were used on tour, reducing power consumption and noise pollution. For control, the sound team had a DiGiCo SD7 console and a Quantum engine. In-ear monitors were primarily Wisycom MTK952 units, as their wide frequency range alleviated the need to carry multiple sets. Lithium batteries on radio communication devices such as wireless microphones and walkie-talkies were replaced by NiMH packages. On special effects, pyrotechnics adopted new formulas to curtail harmful chemicals; balloons were sourced from recyclable material; and confetti cannons adjusted to require less compressed gas for ignition, releasing biodegradable paper. Coldplay also moved from Xylobands to PixMob wristbands made of sugarcane, minimising production by collecting, sterilising and refurbishing them. Lastly, the show had an oversized disco ball with lasers inside.

=== Logistics and transport ===
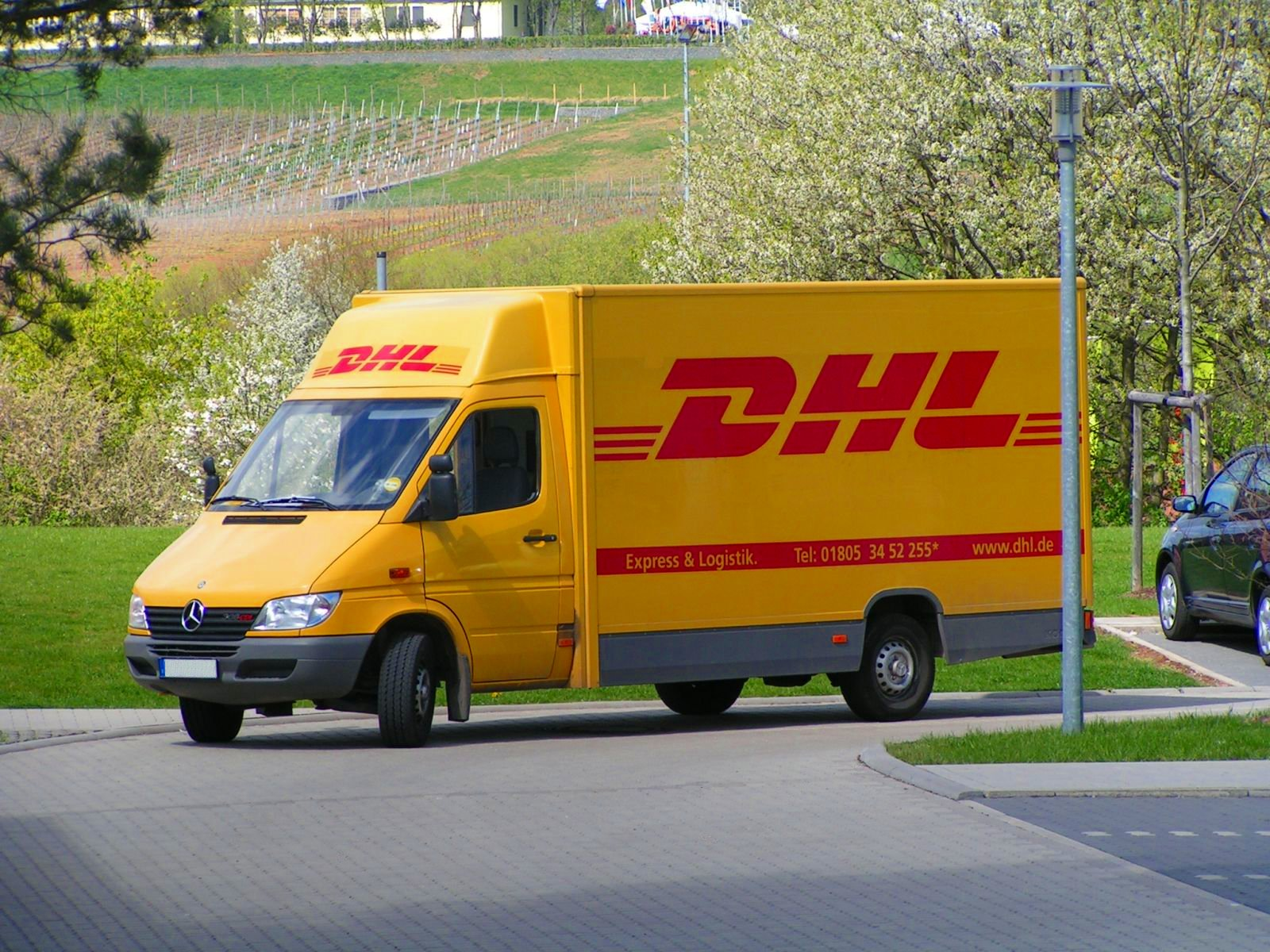
DHL was the main logistics and transport partner for the tour

Coldplay used around 30 trucks and 10 buses to carry their stage and equipment. The fleet consisted of electric vehicles or was fueled with biofuel whenever possible. A sustainability agreement was sent to all venues in advance to verify which environmental policies they could follow, helping the band incorporate local resources into the concerts. Routes were planned to limit air travel, favouring cities accessible to audiences from surrounding regions. The crew relied on both commercial and charter flights, but prioritised the former. Extra fees to harness sustainable aviation fuel were paid at all times, whether for themselves or others.

The product was originally supplied by Neste, but Coldplay severed ties with the company after public accusations of greenwashing. They announced a partnership with DHL for logistics and transport months later. SAP was enlisted to develop a mobile app featuring exclusive photos, videos, news updates and a travel calculator. Fans could also redeem a discount code at the group's merchandise store by opting for cleaner journeys. All of their vendors were selected to provide environmentally conscious pieces, packaged in recycled paper, card or compostable bags whenever possible. The band requested evidence of ethical working conditions as well.

=== Other endeavours ===
To reduce food waste on the road, catering menus adopted plant-based and meat-free options. Coldplay sourced them locally, donated surplus to food banks and composted their organic scraps. Regarding water use, they asked venues to implement aerated taps, low-flushing toilets and minimise hydraulic pressure. Attendees were encouraged to bring reusable bottles and fill them at designated stations. The group endorsed numerous organisations, including Climeworks, the Ocean Cleanup and Sea Shepherd UK. One Tree Planted nurtured a sapling for every ticket sold in forest reserves. A team led by professor John E. Fernández at the Massachusetts Institute of Technology (MIT) was responsible for observing Coldplay's progress on tour, with unavoidable emissions neutralised according to the Oxford principles. The band donated £2.1 million to environmental causes in 2021 as well. For inclusivity, resources entailed SubPac vests, sign language interpreters, touch experiences and a KultureCity sensory refuge station. They also launched the Infinity Ticket program, which offered $20 admissions for fans who could not afford the standard prices. Such entries were non-transferable, available only in pairs and assigned to random seats at the box office on concert day. In 2025, the residency at Wembley Stadium became the first completely operated on solar, wind and kinetic power.

== Opening acts ==
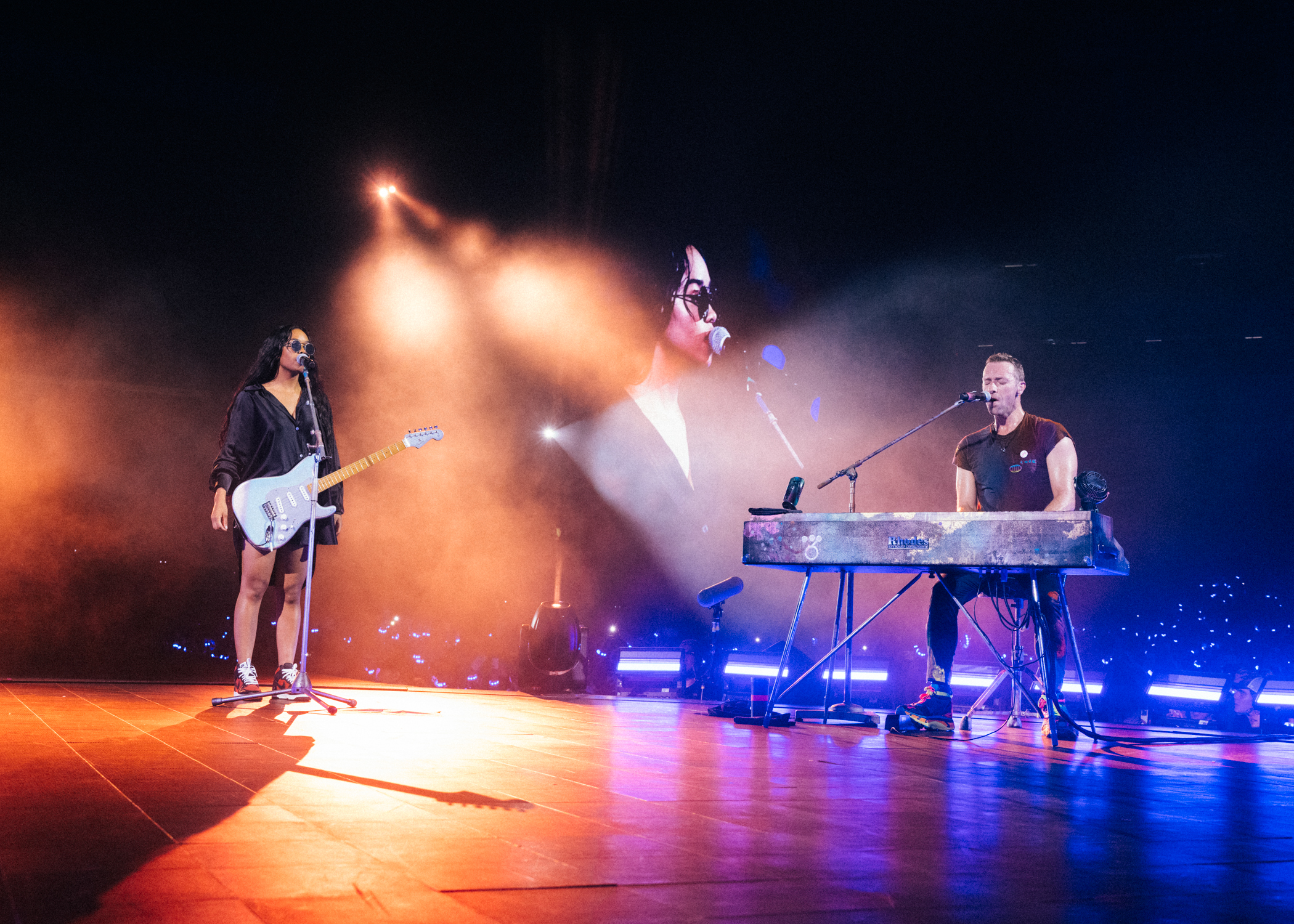
American singer H.E.R. was among the most frequent opening acts

Most of the tour included two supporting acts at each concert, with priority given to up-and-coming female singers. In 2022, H.E.R. opened for Coldplay in Argentina, Costa Rica, Santo Domingo, the United States, and Europe along with a regional musician. London Grammar replaced the singer on select dates from the latter territory, while Camila Cabello assumed the role completely in Peru, Colombia and Chile. Mexico had exclusively national guests, with Carla Morrison and DannyLux performing. Zoe Wees was invited for Berlin but substituted by Alli Neumann due to illness. Clara Cava backed up Zoe Gotusso in Buenos Aires for the same reason.

In 2023, Chvrches supported Coldplay in Brazil and Europe. They followed the established template and collaborated with a new local act at every stop, occasionally being swapped for Griff. On 31 May and 1 June, Manchester featured a surprise set from the Oasis Academy Temple Steel Band before the openers. Jada cancelled her guest appearance in Copenhagen after pregnancy complications, which led to Oh Land claiming the spot. H.E.R. returned when the tour visited North America for the second time, accompanied by 070 Shake and Bobby Gonz in all performances rather than a different artist in each city.

Similar to Mexico, only regional talent was recruited for Asia. Those included Yoasobi, Accusefive, Jasmine Sokko and Rriley. Coldplay also teamed up with the West Australian government for a contest in Perth, inviting two musicians to play along with Thelma Plum, Amy Shark and Tash Sultana. In 2024, the band had Maisie Peters, Janelle Monáe and Maggie Rogers taking turns as primary guests, while the secondary slot belonged to local performers again. Melbourne, Sydney and Auckland were originally scheduled to receive PinkPantheress, but she dropped her set due to health issues. Ayra Starr, Emmanuel Kelly and Shone opened instead. Aside from two concerts in Goyang and Kingston upon Hull, all the 2025 dates featured Elyanna. Her partners for the year included Jasleen Royal, Marf, Twice, Willow, Jim Ward, and Gustavo Dudamel. (Note: Conducting the Simón Bolívar Symphony Orchestra of Venezuela.)

== Concert synopsis ==
=== Main structure ===
Divided into four acts, the concert lasted over two hours and represented "a journey traveling outwards into the unknown to then come home having learned something new". Two guest speakers welcomed attendees and introduced a video showing Coldplay's sustainability efforts. It ran for about two minutes, using "Light Through the Veins" (2009) by Jon Hopkins as the soundtrack. The first act, Planets, explored the belief in a greater magic and the decision to search for it. A live feed exhibited the band members walking to the stage, greeting fans and heading to their respective places while "Flying" (1982) by John Williams transitioned into "Music of the Spheres" and "Higher Power", setting off numerous fireworks and confetti cannons. Once the song ended, Martin removed his jacket and guitarist Jonny Buckland started playing "Adventure of a Lifetime" as giant balls were thrown to the crowd. This was followed by "Paradise", which included extended parts based on call-and-repeat exchanges. A short excerpt of "Oceans" marked the beginning of "The Scientist" and Martin sat at the piano for the first time during the night. He thanked the audience while singing, occasionally incorporating covers as well.

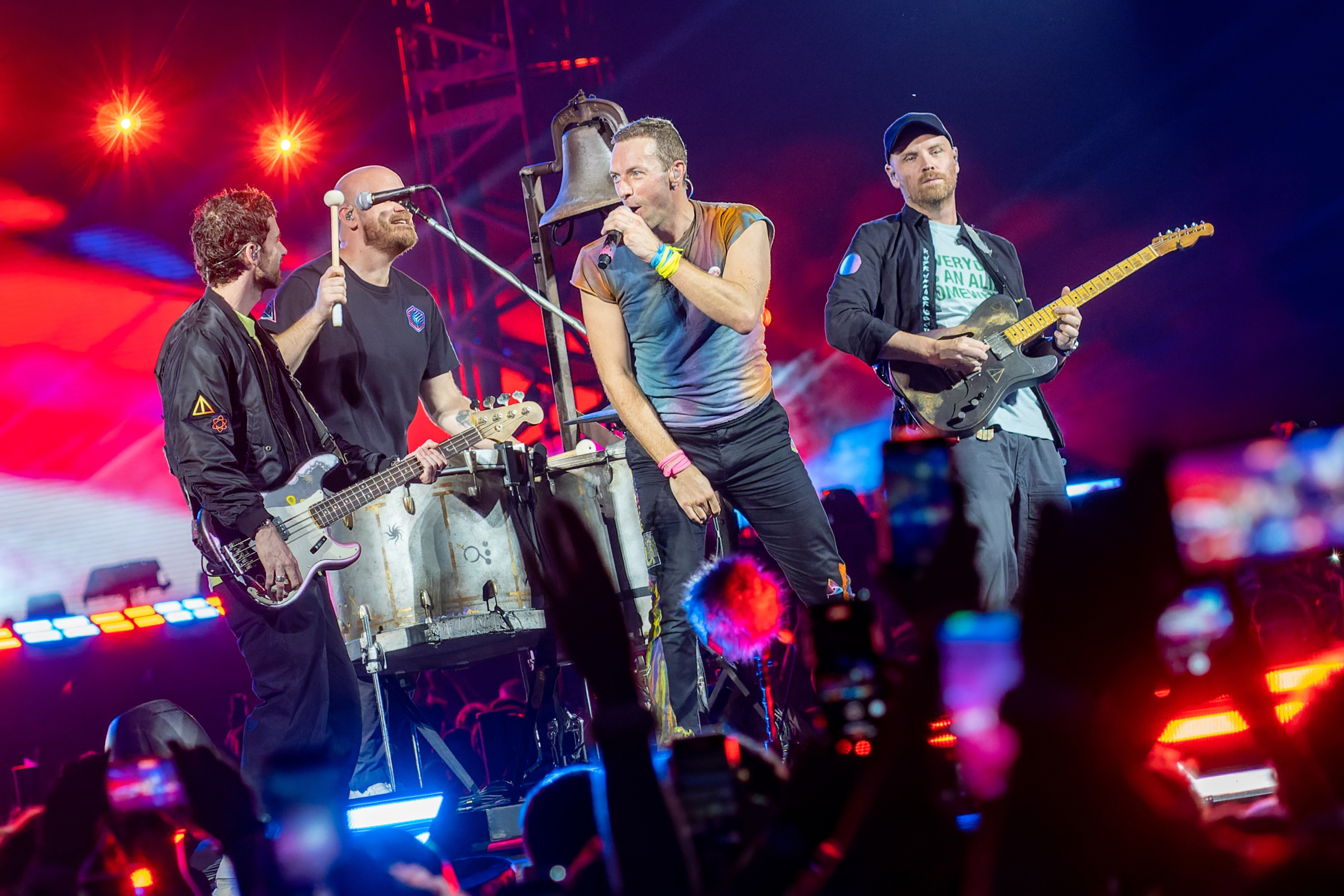
Coldplay performing "Viva la Vida" at Wembley Stadium, London

Footage of the performance was then sped-up, reversed and played back when Coldplay made their way to the B-stage for Moons, an act that symbolised life's difficult phases and experiences. The interlude flowed into "Viva la Vida", with drummer Will Champion directing the chants throughout the song. White, red and blue visuals were used as a reference to the French Revolution. Buckland kicked off "Hymn for the Weekend" by playing the keyboard next. During the last chorus, Martin pretended to be drunk and stumbled on stage, dropping his facade right before another blast of confetti was released into the public.

The show continued with a piano version of "Let Somebody Go", featuring one of the opening acts or a fan who was chosen in advance on select dates. Buckland, Champion and bassist Guy Berryman moved to the main stage for a break in the meantime, returning only for the rotational slot, when the band performed songs such as "In My Place", "Politik", "Orphans" and "Coloratura". Golden lights were emitted from the wristbands right after to begin "Yellow", which was played under a giant disco ball. For the last chorus, Martin asked people near the stage to turn around, face those at the back of the visited stadium and dedicate the lyrics to them.

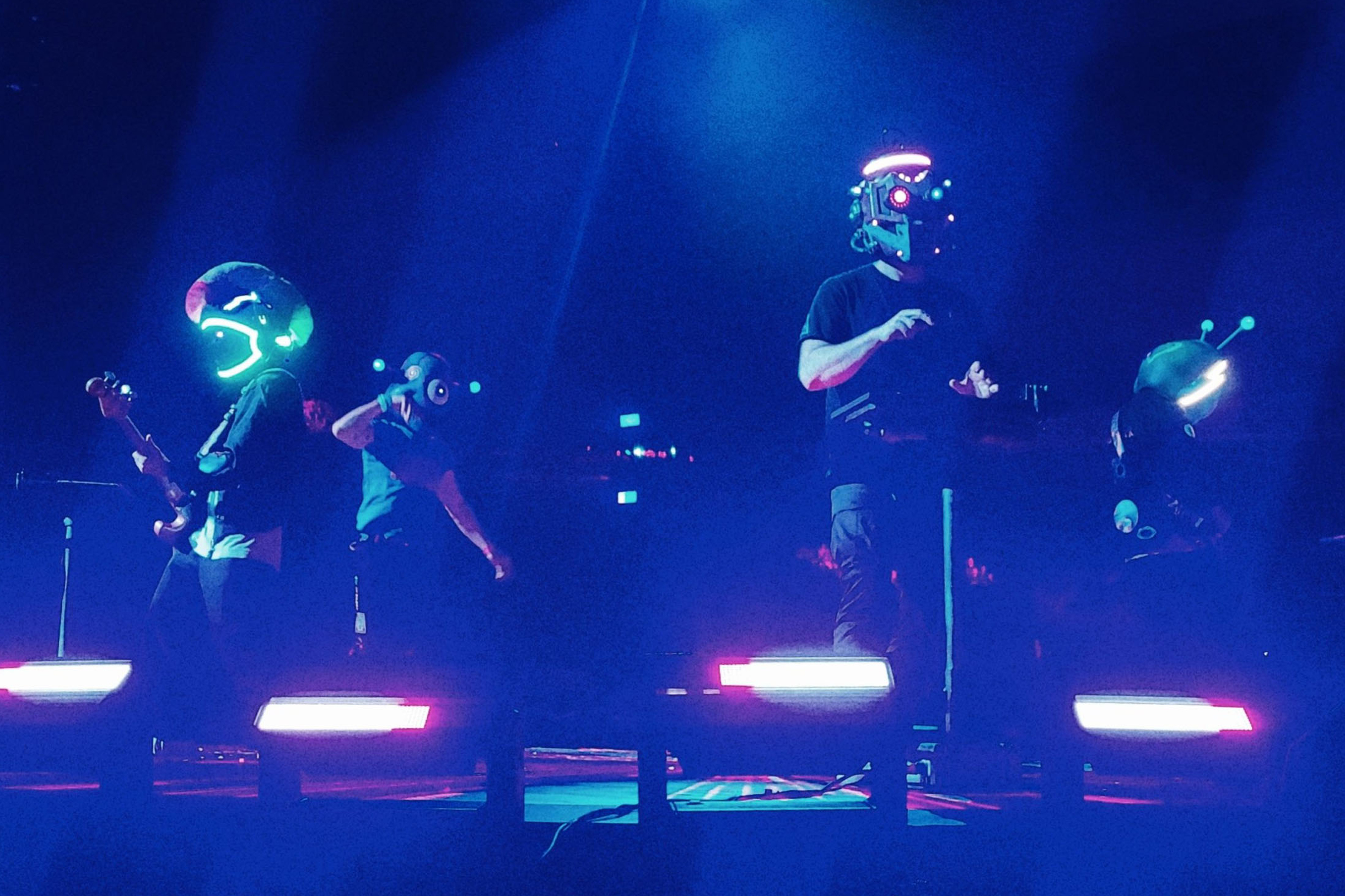
Coldplay performing "Aeterna" at Estádio Couto Pereira, Curitiba

Large red hearts appeared across the stands to launch the third act, Stars. It was based on meeting extraterrestrial beings and embracing others of all backgrounds, starting with "Human Heart". Puppet character Angel Moon mimicked the vocals originally recorded by We Are King. The segment was eventually followed by "People of the Pride", which used various flashing lights and flamethrowers. Martin often waved a pride flag taken from the audience during the song. Next in the set, Coldplay performed "Clocks" amid green lasers in reference to the visual backdrop they had on the Rush of Blood to the Head Tour (2002–2003).

A secondary section called The Lightclub started with "Infinity Sign" being played while the band donned custom helmets. "Something Just Like This" was then interpreted in American Sign Language, before switching to a remix of "Midnight". Once the intermission ended, they removed their extra gear to present "My Universe", featuring the members of BTS on the screens and vocal cues directed at the public during the outro. Proceeding with the concert, "A Sky Full of Stars" unfolded normally until Martin interrupted the song for a brief discussion with Berryman, Buckland and Champion. He then encouraged attendees to put their phones away before kicking off again.

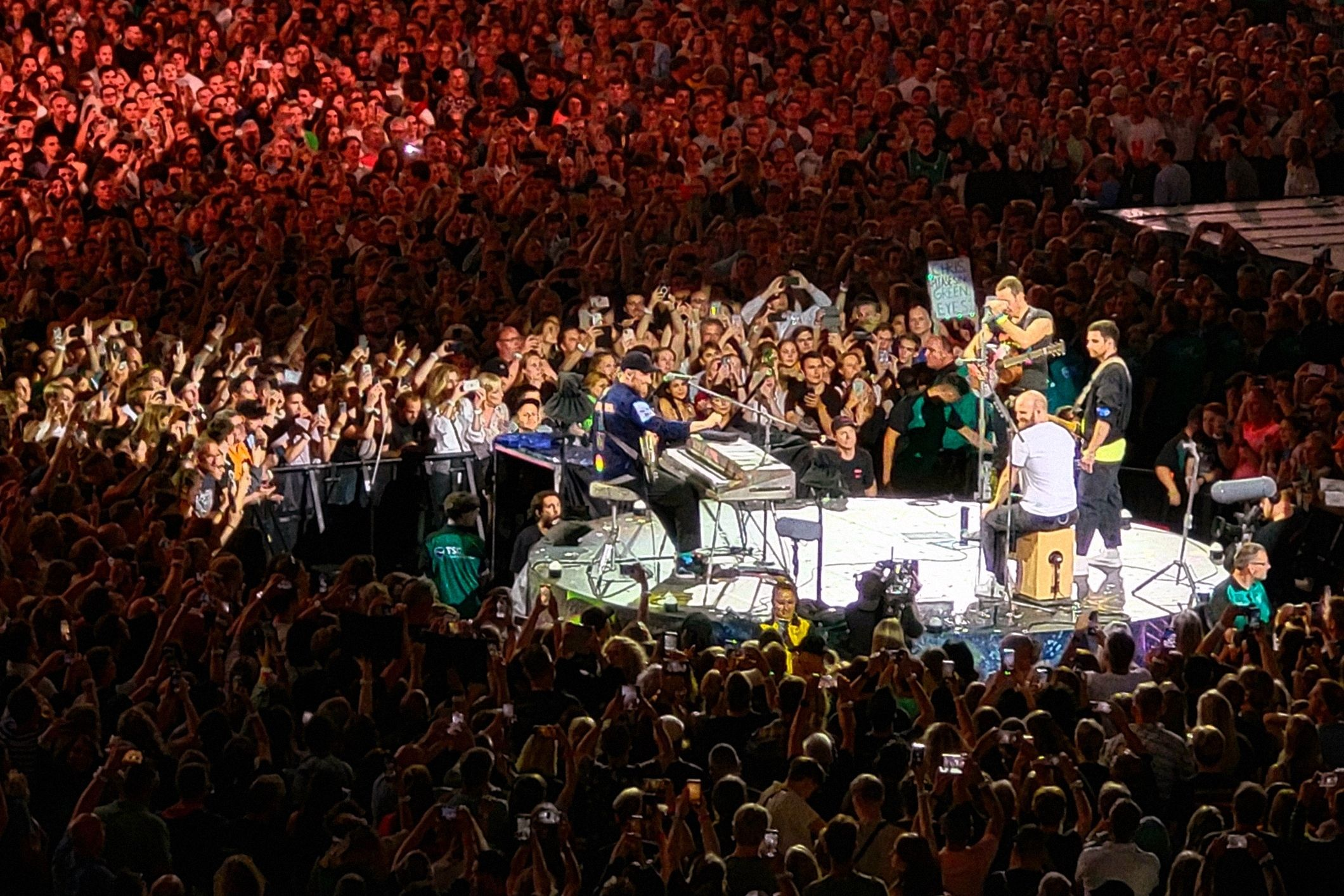
Coldplay performing "Sparks" at the Johan Cruyff Arena, Amsterdam

Home, the fourth and final act, outlined a newfound sense of self-love and appreciation for the diversity of all beings. "Sunrise" played over Louis Armstrong's spoken introduction to "What a Wonderful World" (1967) while the band moved to the C-stage for an acoustic set. They generally performed tracks from Parachutes (2000), followed by a cover, improvisation or guest appearance. The section was also used for acknowledgments, with Martin thanking the tour crew, naming his bandmates for the audience and inviting everyone to raise their arms to send love out into the universe. A fireworks display concluded the latter dynamic.

Coldplay then returned to the main stage for "Humankind" and "Fix You", which included golden lights similar to "Yellow". The last song of the night was "Biutyful", featuring Angel Moon and her group The Weirdos. Butterfly-shaped confetti rained down on the crowd during its outro, while fireworks lit up the sky again. Finally, the central screen exhibited the phrase "Believe in love" after a blast of party streamers closed the show. Berryman, Buckland, Champion and Martin interacted with fans before leaving, sometimes handing over drumsticks or guitar picks as souvenirs. The production credits rolled to the sound of "A Wave" in the background.

=== Changes ===
Prior to Bogotá, "Paradise" lacked extended parts, "Charlie Brown" maintained a permanent position on the set list and "Sunrise" introduced the Stars act. Starting from São Paulo, "Let Somebody Go" gave way to the Songbook, where Martin performed a track chosen by the public. Coldplay updated the Lightclub as well, taking turns between "Hymn for the Weekend" (Seeb remix) and "Something Just Like This". "Aeterna" replaced "Midnight" depending on the pick. Singapore fixed "The Jumbotron Song" at the C-stage, with lyrics improvised about the person on the screens. In Budapest, the band cut "Biutyful" to make "Feelslikeimfallinginlove" the finale. Martin Garrix's "Breakaway" (2024) became part of the Lightclub following their Glastonbury Festival appearance. It featured a pre-designated security guard dancing with them on stage. "Humankind" was removed in Rome to bring "Good Feelings". Coldplay performed it after "Fix You" and invited attendees to wear the diffraction glasses handed out before the show to magnify its visuals. Dublin and Melbourne added "We Pray" and "All My Love" to the set list permanently. The former succeeded "Clocks", while the latter wrapped up the Moons act.

== Commercial performance ==
Coldplay broke numerous touring records worldwide. Billboard ranked them as the top group of the year in 2022 ($342.1 million from 3.8 million tickets), 2023 ($342.5 million from 3.2 million tickets), 2024 ($400.9 million from 3 million tickets), and 2025 ($464.4 million from 3.5 million tickets). Their first European leg sold 1 million admissions in a single day. Extra dates were scheduled at venues including Stade de France and King Baudouin Stadium, where the band performed a record-breaking four times. The achievement was later reproduced at Estadio Nacional de Chile, while their Estadio River Plate visit reached the 10-show milestone. By making $49.7 million from 626,841 entries in Buenos Aires, they earned the highest gross and attendance for a boxscore report in South American history. Over the course of March 2023, Coldplay became the act with most concerts in a row at the Couto Pereira (2), Nilton Santos (3) and Morumbi (6) stadiums. Revenue at the latter surpassed $40.1 million, an unprecedented figure in Brazil.

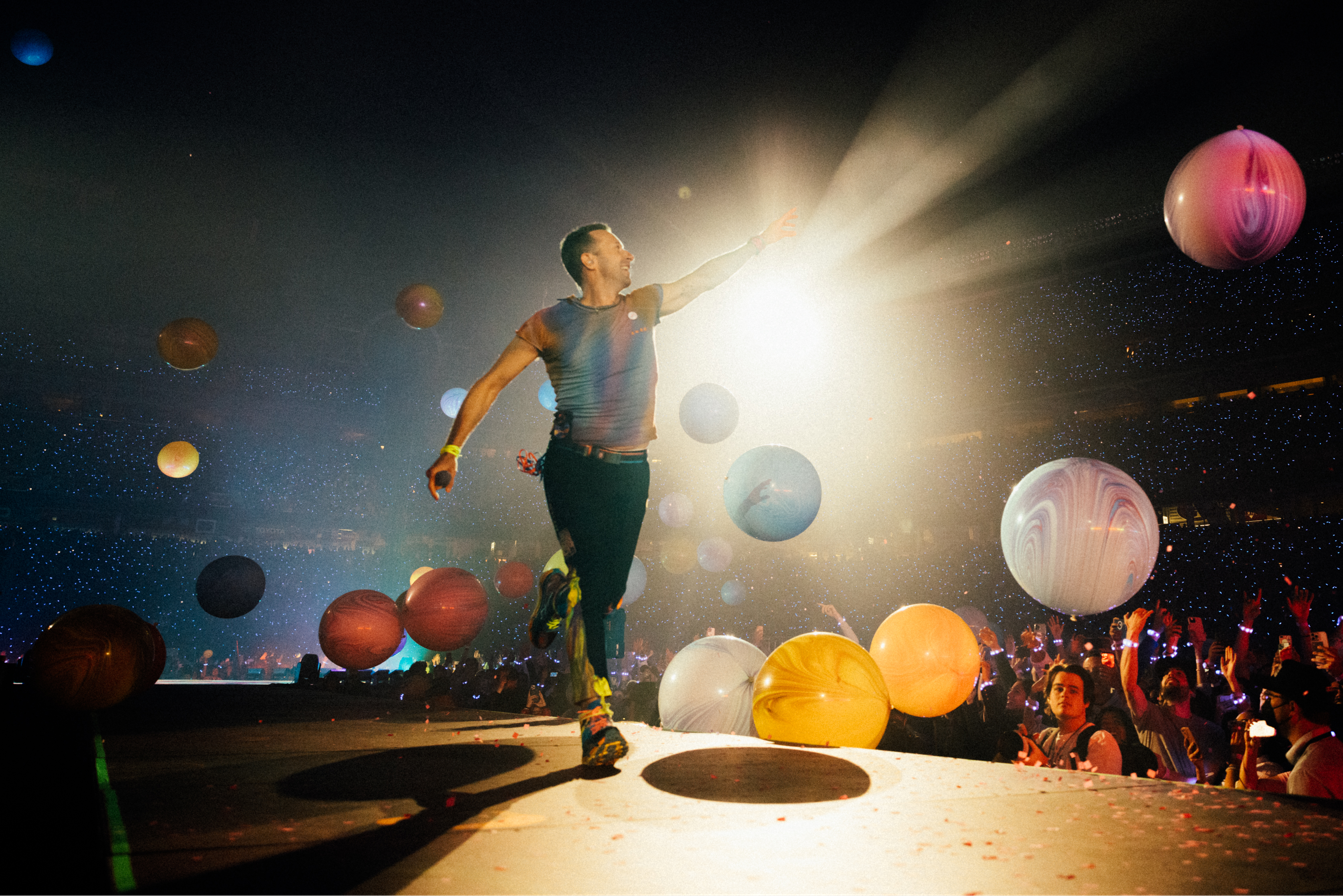
Coldplay have the biggest tour of all time in Europe and Latin America

The second run across Europe shifted 1.4 million tickets in a day, marking the fastest sales for a band at the time. It was also the quickest in general since Robbie Williams' Close Encounters Tour, which set the record at 1.6 million back in 2005. More than 812,000 users vied for admissions in the United Kingdom, overloading the British Ticketmaster server multiple times. News outlets registered extensive online queues in Portugal (450,000), Spain (350,000), Italy (700,000), and the Netherlands (700,000) as well. Coldplay established new records at the Cidade de Coimbra, Lluís Companys, and San Siro stadiums.

Following dates continued to attract overwhelming demand, surpassing 1.7 million people in Indonesia; 400,000 in Malaysia; 365,000 in Australia; and 1 million in Singapore, where the group arranged a six-night residency. SM Tickets had to suspend internet sales in the Philippines due to a server crash. In Taiwan, entries sold out in three minutes for the first concert and six for the second, both of which were unprecedented among Western musicians. Held on 15 November 2023, the show at Gelora Bung Karno Stadium generated $13.9 million, the most for an individual engagement in Southeast Asia.

In the ensuing months, Coldplay broke the record for consecutive performances at Arena Națională (2), Merkur Spiel-Arena (3), Eden Park (3), Helsinki Olympic Stadium (4), and Ernst-Happel-Stadion (4). Over 200,000 buyers sought Auckland tickets, while Vienna drew 600,000 potential customers. Queues for India and Hong Kong gathered 13 million and 500,000 users, respectively. The Narendra Modi Stadium concerts had the largest indoor attendances of the 21st century as well. In September 2024, they moved 800,000 entries in a day for the third British leg, which included 10 dates at the Wembley Stadium. Additionally, the third North American run topped 700,000 tickets sold over a single morning. Coldplay grossed $1.52 billion from 13.1 million admissions in 223 reported shows, securing the most attended tour of all time and the first by a group to earn $1 billion. Regionally, the Music of the Spheres World Tour achieved the highest revenue and turnout in European and Latin American history.

== Critical reception ==
=== North America ===
The tour received widespread acclaim from music critics worldwide. (Note: Attributed to the Evening Standard, Gaffa, Rock & Pop, Rolling Stone India, The Sydney Morning Herald, and Toronto Star.) Andrew Chamings from San Francisco Chronicle said that despite his "cynicism, Coldplay's show was a joyous, bright, cathartic post-pandemic triumph". Writing for Houston Press, Marco Torres called it "a beautiful dream, with balloons flying around, confetti bursting from air cannons and lasers shooting from the stage through the smoke" as the group performed. Fort Worth Star-Telegram's Mac Engel claimed that Martin showed all of the skills that make him one of the top performers of his generation and made Cotton Bowl feel intimate with a powerful set. In her review for Chicago Sun-Times, Selena Fragassi credited the concerts with setting the bar for what tours could be like in the future. Similarly, Christopher A. Daniel from The Atlanta Journal-Constitution praised the production values as "reminiscent of the art rock foundation paved by bands like Genesis, Kraftwerk and Pink Floyd", adding that Coldplay are set to become a "must-see legendary act". Furthermore, Philip Cosores of Uproxx opined that "there is no wasted energy, with every bit of the set time used to create memories and impact the audience". He also concluded that if environmental concerns become the norm for touring, the band's status as an essential contemporary artist "will take on greater meaning than just the legacy of their music". In a more mixed review, Ed Masley told The Arizona Republic that their use of the Weirdos during segments of the performance felt awkward, while "Biutyful" did not work well as a closer.

=== Europe ===
Regioactive's Torsten Reitz declared that they were "full of energy and much more powerful than on record", mastering both upbeat and quiet moments. Marine Pineau wrote that Coldplay lived up to their reputation as a live act and lauded the band for their showmanship in her review for Virgin Radio. Alexis Petridis from The Guardian praised the tour for being a "genuinely immersive" experience which gave depth to its namesake album through an inventive approach, rating the residency at Wembley Stadium with five stars. Kate Solomon of The Times considered it a "triumphant homecoming", awarded Coldplay four stars and commended their musicianship. The Telegraph's Neil McCormick hailed them as "modern masters" of stadium entertainment and granted the same score. Writing a five-star piece for NME, Hannah Mylrea stated that the band offered a masterclass in how a massive pop show can be done. Wilson Ledo from CNN Portugal noted the concert had a lasting euphoria and praised how Martin interacted with the public. In his Muzikalia review, Pau Clot mentioned that Coldplay "cannot be matched by anyone on this planet today". Göteborgs-Posten's Johan Lindqvista highlighted the stage presence of the group and concluded they are "more than special effects". Mark Beaumont of The Independent called their Glastonbury Festival set "the spectacle of a lifetime". On the other hand, Rolling Stone UK's Will Richards insisted that the midsection was drawn-out and had more potential. Vicky Jessop from The Standard defined it as "wildly uneven".

=== South America ===
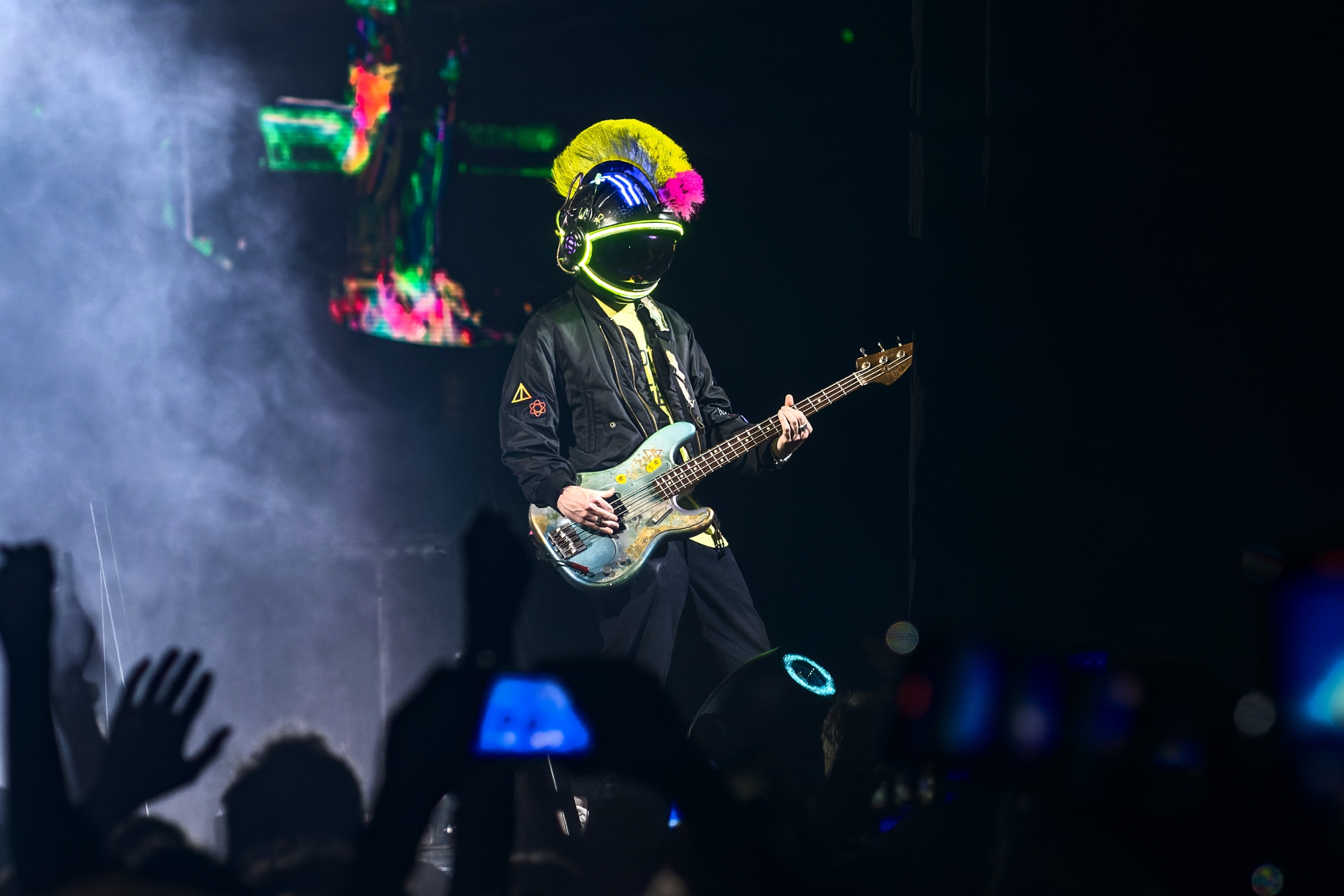
Berryman performing "Infinity Sign" at Wembley Stadium, London

Felipe Branco Cruz from Veja affirmed that Coldplay "reinvented the concept of arena rock" with their Rock in Rio performance, turning fans into protagonists of the show rather than just spectators and carrying on the legacy of spectacles that transcend music, first established by groups like Pink Floyd, Queen and U2. Writing for UOL, Yolanda Reis argued it is "undeniable" they are "true showmen" and defined the concert as unforgettable. Roberto Medina, the founder and president of the festival, said "there has only been one moment like tonight, Freddie Mercury in 1985. It was incredible, it was memorable".

El Comercio's Juan Carlos Fangacio Arakaki praised their Lima set lists for being complete, diverse and well distributed. Pablo Figueroa stated on CNN Chile that Coldplay managed to deliver one of the best music events in the country since its transition to democracy. An editorial from Infobae lauded the group's versatility while performing in Buenos Aires. Mauro Apicella of La Nación declared that they are leading the way in stadium technology and innovation. Omelete writer Caio Coletti described Berryman's bass as "irresistibly pulsating" and upheld that Champion proved to be a good backing vocalist by guiding the "Viva la Vida" chants.

=== Asia–Pacific ===
Saori Yoshiba described the show as "a mixture of openness and intimate intensity" on Barks, adding that she experienced a "night where the power of music and the energy of a live performance left a lasting, euphoric feeling". Writing for CNN Indonesia, Muhammad Feraldi Hifzurahman opined that Coldplay "are truly [something] you should try at least once in your life", praising the chemistry the band had with their fans. However, the review included only four stars out of five because the organisers of the venue did not managed the public well. Sam Mead of The Music stated that "over two decades in, this is [the group] at their best—hard-hitting, punchy grooves". The West Australian's Caleb Runciman defended that Coldplay were responsible for the greatest event in Optus Stadium history, delivering "a concert, theatre production and light show all in one". He underscored their musical prowess as well, giving them five stars. Poppy Reid from Rolling Stone Australia said that the band solidified their status among the most visionary live acts, consistently blending hits with visual wonders. Conversely, The Guardian Australia's Rosamund Brennan questioned the audience engagement while recent material was played. Gregorio Larrazabal applauded the inclusion of national guests on his piece for the Manila Bulletin, illustrating it as a spectacle of global and local melodies intertwining.

== Accolades ==
List of awards and nominations
| Year | Ceremony | Category | Result | Ref. |
|---|---|---|---|---|
| 2023 | Guinness World Records | Highest-Grossing Music Tour by a Group – Current Year | Broken | |
| 2023 | iHeartRadio Music Awards | Tour of the Year | Won | |
| 2023 | Parnelli Awards | Lighting Company of the Year (Upstaging) | Nominated | |
| 2023 | Parnelli Awards | Lighting Designer of the Year (Sooner Routhier) | Nominated | |
| 2023 | Parnelli Awards | Lighting Director of the Year (Shaheem Litchmore) | Nominated | |
| 2023 | Parnelli Awards | Production Designer of the Year (Misty Buckley) | Nominated | |
| 2023 | Parnelli Awards | Sound Company of the Year (Firehouse Productions) | Nominated | |
| 2023 | Parnelli Awards | Video Director of the Year (Ant Barrett) | Nominated | |
| 2023 | Pollstar Awards | Major Tour of the Year | Nominated | |
| 2023 | Pollstar Awards | Rock Tour of the Year | Nominated | |
| 2023 | Pollstar Awards | WhizBang Award | Won | |
| 2023 | Pollstar Awards | Live Music Is Better Award | Nominated | |
| 2023 | Pollstar Women of Live Awards | Tour Manager (Marguerite Nguyen) | Honoree | |
| 2023 | Ticketmaster Awards | Concert of the Year – Poland | Nominated | |
| 2023 | Ticketmaster Awards | Best International Concert – France | Won | |
| 2023 | Ticketmaster Awards | Most Anticipated Event of 2023 – Italy | Won | |
| 2023 | TPi Awards (Note: The TPi Awards was established in 2002 to honour excellence in global live entertainment based on a public-voted selection process.) | Live Production of the Year | Nominated | |
| 2024 | The Arthur Awards | The Gaffer (Chris Kansy) | Won | |
| 2024 | Guinness World Records | Highest Attendance for a Music Tour | Won | |
| 2024 | Guinness World Records | Highest-Grossing Music Tour by a Group (Note: Coldplay grossed $1.52 billion while the record belonged to U2's 360° Tour (2009–2011) at $736.4 million.) | Won | |
| 2024 | iHeartRadio Music Awards | Favorite Tour Photographer (Anna Lee) | Nominated | |
| 2024 | People's Choice Awards | The Concert Tour of the Year | Nominated | |
| 2024 | Pollstar Awards | Pop Tour of the Year | Nominated | |
| 2024 | Pollstar Awards | Road Warrior of the Year (Marguerite Nguyen) | Nominated | |
| 2024 | RTS Craft & Design Awards | Director – Multicamera (Janet Fraser Crook) | Won | |
| 2024 | Ticketmaster Awards | Concert of the Year – Sweden | Won | |
| 2024 | Ticketmaster Awards | Concert of the Year – Switzerland | Won | |
| 2024 | Ticketmaster Awards | Most Anticipated Event of 2024 – Australia | Nominated | |
| 2024 | Ticketmaster Awards | Most Anticipated Event of 2024 – France | Won | |
| 2024 | Ticketmaster Awards | Most Anticipated Event of 2024 – Germany | Won | |
| 2024 | Ticketmaster Awards | Most Anticipated Event of 2024 – Italy | Won | |
| 2024 | Ticketmaster Awards | Most Anticipated Event of 2024 – New Zealand | Won | |
| 2025 | Access All Areas Awards (Note: The Access All Areas Awards was established in 2022 to honour excellence in live entertainment based on a peer-voted selection process.) | Live Event of the Year – Middle East & Africa | Won | |
| 2025 | Guinness World Records | Longest Residency by a Musician at Wembley Stadium (Single Run) | Broken | |
| 2025 | iHeartRadio Music Awards | Favorite Surprise Guest (Selena Gomez Songbook) | Nominated | |
| 2025 | Middle East Event Awards | Best Entertainment Production | Nominated | |
| 2025 | Middle East Event Awards | Best Event Marketing Campaign of the Year | Won | |
| 2025 | Middle East Event Awards | Best Music Event | Won | |
| 2025 | Middle East Event Awards | Best Sustainability Initiative | Nominated | |
| 2025 | Parnelli Awards | Lighting Director of the Year (Shaheem Litchmore) | Nominated | |
| 2025 | Pollstar Awards | Major Tour of the Year | Nominated | |
| 2025 | Pollstar Awards | Rock Tour of the Year | Nominated | |
| 2025 | Pollstar Women of Live Awards | Tour Manager (Marguerite Nguyen) | Honoree | |
| 2025 | RTS Programme Awards | Live Event (Glastonbury Festival 2024) | Nominated | |
| 2025 | Ticketmaster Awards | Event of the Year – Austria | Won | |
| 2025 | Ticketmaster Awards | Music Event of the Year – Greece | Won | |
| 2025 | Ticketmaster Awards | International Concert of the Year – France | Won | |
| 2025 | TPiMEA Awards (Note: The TPiMEA Awards was established in 2018 to honour excellence in Middle Eastern and African live entertainment based on a public-voted selection process.) | Outstanding Event Production of the Year | Won | |
| 2025 | TurnTable Music Awards | Outstanding Achievement in Live Performance (Ayra Starr) | Won | |
| 2026 | The Arthur Awards | Top Tour | Nominated | |
| 2026 | iHeartRadio Music Awards | Favorite Tour Tradition ("The Jumbotron Song") | Won | |
| 2026 | iHeartRadio Music Awards | Favorite Tour Photographer (Anna Lee) | Nominated | |
| 2026 | Las Culturistas Culture Awards | PDA of the Year ("The Jumbotron Song") | Nominated | |
| 2026 | Pollstar Awards | Pop Tour of the Year | Nominated | |

== Releases ==
On 17 July 2022, Coldplay launched an audio transmission from Stade de France on their tour app, titled Live in Paris. The third show at Estadio River Plate, held on 28 October, was part of Live Broadcast from Buenos Aires, a theatrical event directed by Paul Dugdale. Screenings were held in a record 81 countries and grossed $8.4 million. The band released a director's cut on 19 April 2023, under the name Music of the Spheres: Live at River Plate. Inspired by their shows at Stadio Diego Armando Maradona and arranged by Stillz, the short film Tutto Passa – A Tribute to Napoli premiered on 23 May 2024. The group's tenth studio album, Moon Music, launched on 4 October with songs recorded on the road. Coldplay also joined Disney+ Hotstar for Live in Ahmedabad, drawing more than 8.3 million views on 26 January 2025. Footage from the concerts at Wembley Stadium became available on 30 December, under Music of the Spheres World Tour: An Immersive Experience, for a limited run via Meta Horizon.

== Legacy ==
According to Pollstar's Eric Renner Brown, Coldplay have ushered into "a new era of sustainable touring" with the Music of the Spheres World Tour. Their efforts were considered unprecedented for a stadium concert run, since the band reduced CO_{2} emissions by 59% in their first two years of activity, planted 9 million trees in forest reserves, and had their methods adopted by Live Nation to provide green options to more artists. Furthermore, they were listed among the most influential climate action leaders in the world by Time. As the tour became a leading topic of news coverage in visited regions, it was also considered a media phenomenon. Mark Beaumont from The Times stated that the band regained public respect and credibility, which prompted a shift in attitude towards them.

Countries such as Portugal, Italy, and Malaysia experienced significant rises in ticket speculation due to high demand for their shows. Investigation of such cases inspired new legislation. The government of Indonesia decided to simplify their event permit process after Coldplay were not able to schedule more dates in the region. Media outlets informed that ticketless fans came together outside their respective venues in multiple cities to hear the band perform, including 34,000 in Munich. (Note: Sources: Barcelona; Zurich; Kaohsiung; Kuala Lumpur; Singapore; Helsinki; Munich; El Paso.) They boosted local economies as well, drawing comparisons to football tournaments like the Champions League. On music charts, their discography enjoyed a resurgence in sales and streams. To assist non-profit organisations, Coldplay teamed up with Global Citizen and the Love Button Global Movement, recruiting new volunteers at every tour stop.

== Set list ==
This set list was taken from the 1 June 2025 concert in Stanford, United States. It does not represent all shows throughout the tour.

Act I – Planets

1. "Flying" (from E.T. the Extra-Terrestrial)
2. "Music of the Spheres" (intro)
3. "Higher Power"
4. "Adventure of a Lifetime"
5. "Paradise"
6. "The Scientist" (with elements of "Oceans")

Act II – Moons

7. "Viva la Vida"
8. "Hymn for the Weekend"
9. Songbook
10. "God Put a Smile upon Your Face"
11. "Yellow"
12. "All My Love"

Act III – Stars

13. "Human Heart"
14. "People of the Pride"
15. "Clocks"
16. "We Pray"
17. "Infinity Sign" (with elements of "Music of the Spheres II" and "Every Teardrop Is a Waterfall")
18. "Something Just Like This" (performed in American Sign Language)
19. "Breakaway"
20. "My Universe"
21. "A Sky Full of Stars"

Act IV – Home

22. "Sunrise" (with Louis Armstrong's speech from "What a Wonderful World")
23. "Sparks"
24. "The Jumbotron Song"
25. "Fix You" (with elements of "Biutyful")
26. "Good Feelings"
27. "Feelslikeimfallinginlove"
28. "A Wave" (outro)

=== Details ===
- "God Put a Smile upon Your Face", "In My Place" and "The Scientist" featured Champion's lead vocals on select dates.
- "Don't Panic" featured Buckland and Champion's lead vocals on select dates.
- "Sparks" featured pedal steel guitar players on select dates. It was performed in Polish in Warsaw.
- "Magic" was performed in the local language during Act IV on select dates, occasionally featuring Coldplay's opening acts.
- "Something Just Like This", "Fix You" and "Biutyful" featured percussionists or choirs on select dates.
- "Cry Cry Cry" was performed during Act IV on select dates, featuring Lauren Mayberry.
- "All My Love" closed the show in Athens, Dublin, Kingston upon Hull, and London (2025).
- "Good Feelings" featured Coldplay's opening acts on select dates.
- "We Pray" featured local guests performing a new verse on select dates.
- "Human Heart" was shortened and performed without Martin starting from Melbourne.
- "Fix You" included elements of "Biutyful" starting from Melbourne.
- "Hot Body" was performed with Ayra Starr between "Good Feelings" and "Feelslikeimfallinginlove" in Miami Gardens.
- "Good Feelings" was omitted from the set list in Kingston upon Hull, and London (2025).

=== Highlights ===
The band performed covers, received guests, invited fans and improvised songs specifically for the occasion on numerous dates, skipping to the rest of the show otherwise.

Covers

- San José, 2022 – "Patriótica Costarricense".
- Santo Domingo, 2022 – "Bachata Rosa".
- Guadalupe, 2022 – "El Corrido de Monterrey".
- Mexico City, 2022 – "Amor Eterno".
- Warsaw, 2022 – "Sen o Warszawie".
- Buenos Aires, 2022 – "De Música Ligera".
- Coimbra, 2023 – "Balada da Despedida".
- Manchester, 2023 – "Sit Down".
- Naples, 2023 – "Napule È".
- Milan, 2023 – "Oh Mia Bèla Madunina".
- Zurich, 2023 – "Your Song".
- Copenhagen, 2023 – "Der Er et Yndigt Land".
- Gothenburg, 2023 – "Rocket Man" and "Everybody (Backstreet's Back)".
- Tokyo, 2023 – "The Astronaut".
- Helsinki, 2024 – "Happy Birthday to You".
- Dublin, 2024 – "Ride On".
- Ahmedabad, 2025 – "Vande Mataram " and "Maa Tujhe Salaam".
- Nashville, 2025 – "Changes".

Guests

- Zapopan, 2022 – Fher Olvera.
- Mexico City, 2022 – Huillo.
- Chicago, 2022 – Lupe Fiasco.
- East Rutherford, 2022 – Kylie Minogue and Bruce Springsteen.
- Atlanta, 2022 – Kelly Rowland.
- Warsaw, 2022 – Romario Punch.
- Brussels, 2022 – Davide Rossi and Sviatoslav Vakarchuk.
- London, 2022 – Craig David, Max Martin, Natalie Imbruglia, Jacob Collier, Benjamin Teacher, Shaznay Lewis, Simon Pegg, Steve Coogan and Stormzy.
- Glasgow, 2022 – Edwyn Collins.
- Bogotá, 2022 – Manuel Turizo.
- Buenos Aires, 2022 – Golshifteh Farahani, Jin, Tini, Charly Alberti, Zeta Bosio and Turizo.
- São Paulo, 2023 – Seu Jorge, Sandy and Rael.
- Rio de Janeiro, 2023 – The Velosos (Moreno, Zeca and Tom), Seu Jorge, Milton Nascimento and Hamilton de Holanda.
- Coimbra, 2023 – Bárbara Bandeira, Ivandro, Carminho and 5ª Punkada.
- Barcelona, 2023 – Gipsy Kings.
- Manchester, 2023 – Aitch, Teacher and Tim Booth.
- Cardiff, 2023 – Kris Williams, Kelly Jones and the Bridgend Male Choir.
- Naples, 2023 – Rossi.
- Milan, 2023 – Rossi, Zucchero and Elisa.
- Zurich, 2023 – Roger Federer.
- Copenhagen, 2023 – Rossi.
- Vancouver, 2023 – Bryan Adams.
- San Diego, 2023 – Mzansi Youth Choir.
- Pasadena, 2023 – Collier, Stevie Mackey, We Are King, the Mzansi Youth Choir and Selena Gomez.
- Jakarta, 2023 – Maliq & D'essentials.
- Bocaue, 2024 – Lola Amour and Dilaw.
- Bangkok, 2024 – Zweed N' Roll.
- Athens, 2024 – ZAF.
- Bucharest, 2024 – Babasha.
- Décines-Charpieu, 2024 – This Is Our Home.
- Pilton, 2024 – Victoria Canal, the Baltic String Orchestra, Little Simz, Elyanna, the Kutis (Femi and Made), Laura Mvula, Michael J. Fox and Vula Malinga.
- Rome, 2024 – Rossi and Ayra Starr.
- Helsinki, 2024 – Kiurut.
- Munich, 2024 – Shawn Mendes.
- Dublin, 2024 – Little Simz, Burna Boy, Elyanna, Tini, Rossi and Aslan.
- Melbourne, 2024 – Ralph Macchio.
- Goyang, 2025 – Jin and Rosé.
- Nashville, 2025 – Keith Urban.
- Kingston upon Hull, 2025 – The Pink Singers.
- London, 2025 – The Pink Singers, Burna Boy, Pegg, Rossi, Tim Wheeler and the Kutis.

Songbooks

- Guadalupe, 2022 – "Gravity".
- Mexico City, 2022 – "Fly On" and "Green Eyes".
- Houston, 2022 – "Let Somebody Go".
- Lima, 2022 – "Til Kingdom Come".
- Santiago, 2022 – "Everglow".
- São Paulo, 2023 – "Charlie Brown", "Daddy" and "Everything's Not Lost".
- Rio de Janeiro, 2023 – "Strawberry Swing" and "Champion of the World".
- Coimbra, 2023 – "The Hardest Part" and "Magic".
- Barcelona, 2023 – "What's Love Got to Do with It".
- Manchester, 2023 – "Everyday Life", "A Rush of Blood to the Head" and "Up&Up".
- Naples, 2023 – "Trouble".
- Milan, 2023 – "Politik" and "Swallowed in the Sea".
- Amsterdam, 2023 – "Barbie Girl".
- Vancouver, 2023 – "In My Place".
- Singapore, 2024 – "Us Against the World".
- Bangkok, 2024 – "Warning Sign".
- Bucharest, 2024 – "Lost!".
- Budapest, 2024 – "Don't Look Back in Anger" and "Shiver".
- Decinés-Charpieu, 2024 – "Don't Panic".
- Vienna, 2024 – "Love Story", "Shake It Off" and "The 1".
- Dublin, 2024 – "Don't Forget Me".
- Miami Gardens, 2025 – "Every Teardrop Is a Waterfall".
- Kingston upon Hull, 2025 – "True Love".
- London, 2025 – "Jupiter" and "I Wanna Dance with Somebody (Who Loves Me)".

Improvisations

- Dallas, 2022 – "Dallas Every Day".
- Houston, 2022 – "Houston #2".
- Glendale, 2022 – "Phoenix, AZ".
- Chicago, 2022 – "Chicago Song".
- Landover, 2022 – "Washington, D.C. the Day We Got Set Free".
- Philadelphia, 2022 – "Philadelphia Song".
- Tampa, 2022 – "Tampa Bay on a Tuesday".
- Gothenburg, 2023 – "Jennifer's Birthday Song".
- Vancouver, 2023 – "Leo's Birthday Song".
- Perth, 2023 – "Song for Australia" and "Song for Shane".
- Kuala Lumpur, 2023 – "Malaysian Rain".
- Bocaue, 2024 – "Local Traffic Song".
- Denver, 2025 – "Rain in Colorado".

== Tour dates ==
List of 2022 concerts
| Date (2022) | City | Country | Venue | Opening acts | Attendance | Revenue |
|---|---|---|---|---|---|---|
| 18 March | San José | Costa Rica | Estadio Nacional de Costa Rica | H.E.R. MishCatt | 86,199 / 86,199 | $5,687,127 |
| 19 March | San José | Costa Rica | Estadio Nacional de Costa Rica | H.E.R. MishCatt | 86,199 / 86,199 | $5,687,127 |
| 22 March | Santo Domingo | Dominican Republic | Estadio Olímpico Félix Sánchez | H.E.R. La Marimba | 30,524 / 30,524 | $2,571,873 |
| 25 March | Guadalupe (Note: Labelled as Monterrey in promotional material.) | Mexico | Estadio BBVA | Carla Morrison; DannyLux | 112,262 / 112,262 | $8,996,432 |
| 26 March | Guadalupe | Mexico | Estadio BBVA | Carla Morrison; DannyLux | 112,262 / 112,262 | $8,996,432 |
| 29 March | Zapopan (Note: Labelled as Guadalajara in promotional material.) | Mexico | Estadio Akron | Carla Morrison; DannyLux | 90,153 / 90,153 | $8,190,681 |
| 30 March | Zapopan | Mexico | Estadio Akron | Carla Morrison; DannyLux | 90,153 / 90,153 | $8,190,681 |
| 3 April | Mexico City | Mexico | Foro Sol | Carla Morrison; DannyLux | 259,591 / 259,591 | $19,544,924 |
| 4 April | Mexico City | Mexico | Foro Sol | Carla Morrison; DannyLux | 259,591 / 259,591 | $19,544,924 |
| 6 April | Mexico City | Mexico | Foro Sol | Carla Morrison; DannyLux | 259,591 / 259,591 | $19,544,924 |
| 7 April | Mexico City | Mexico | Foro Sol | Carla Morrison; DannyLux | 259,591 / 259,591 | $19,544,924 |
| 6 May | Dallas | United States | Cotton Bowl | H.E.R. Leila Pari | 58,669 / 58,669 | $6,065,763 |
| 8 May | Houston | United States | NRG Stadium | H.E.R. Alaina Castillo | 46,959 / 46,959 | $5,413,072 |
| 12 May (Note: The concert in Glendale on 12 May 2022 was originally planned for 3 May 2022, but it was rescheduled due to logistical reasons.) | Glendale (Note: Labelled as Phoenix in promotional material.) | United States | State Farm Stadium | H.E.R. Kacy Hill | 42,849 / 42,849 | $3,542,528 |
| 15 May (Note: The concert in Santa Clara on 15 May 2022 was originally planned for 23 April 2022, but it was rescheduled due to logistical reasons.) | Santa Clara | United States | Levi's Stadium | H.E.R. Bobby Gonz | 50,791 / 50,791 | $5,861,025 |
| 28 May | Chicago | United States | Soldier Field | H.E.R. Drama | 107,072 / 107,072 | $10,969,930 |
| 29 May | Chicago | United States | Soldier Field | H.E.R. Drama | 107,072 / 107,072 | $10,969,930 |
| 1 June | Landover (Note: Labelled as Washington, D.C. in promotional material.) | United States | FedExField | H.E.R. Shaed | 47,133 / 47,133 | $5,196,389 |
| 4 June | East Rutherford | United States | MetLife Stadium | H.E.R. Bea Miller | 117,240 / 117,240 | $13,153,892 |
| 5 June | East Rutherford | United States | MetLife Stadium | H.E.R. Bea Miller | 117,240 / 117,240 | $13,153,892 |
| 8 June | Philadelphia | United States | Lincoln Financial Field | H.E.R. Lizzy McAlpine | 57,415 / 57,415 | $5,606,712 |
| 11 June | Atlanta | United States | Mercedes-Benz Stadium | H.E.R. Mariah the Scientist | 54,059 / 54,059 | $5,913,613 |
| 14 June | Tampa | United States | Raymond James Stadium | H.E.R. Gigi | 55,980 / 55,980 | $6,300,175 |
| 2 July | Frankfurt | Germany | Deutsche Bank Park | H.E.R. Alli Neumann | 138,282 / 138,282 | $13,745,935 |
| 3 July | Frankfurt | Germany | Deutsche Bank Park | H.E.R. Alli Neumann | 138,282 / 138,282 | $13,745,935 |
| 5 July | Frankfurt | Germany | Deutsche Bank Park | London Grammar; Alli Neumann | 138,282 / 138,282 | $13,745,935 |
| 8 July | Warsaw | Poland | PGE Narodowy | H.E.R. Mery Spolsky | 57,574 / 57,574 | $4,576,813 |
| 10 July | Berlin | Germany | Olympiastadion | London Grammar; Alli Neumann | 216,535 / 216,535 | $20,389,783 |
| 12 July | Berlin | Germany | Olympiastadion | H.E.R. Alli Neumann | 216,535 / 216,535 | $20,389,783 |
| 13 July | Berlin | Germany | Olympiastadion | H.E.R. Alli Neumann | 216,535 / 216,535 | $20,389,783 |
| 16 July | Saint-Denis (Note: Labelled as Paris in promotional material.) | France | Stade de France | H.E.R. Gaumar | 318,331 / 318,331 | $28,035,164 |
| 17 July | Saint-Denis | France | Stade de France | H.E.R. Gaumar | 318,331 / 318,331 | $28,035,164 |
| 19 July | Saint-Denis | France | Stade de France | London Grammar; Lous and the Yakuza | 318,331 / 318,331 | $28,035,164 |
| 20 July | Saint-Denis | France | Stade de France | London Grammar; Lous and the Yakuza | 318,331 / 318,331 | $28,035,164 |
| 5 August | Brussels | Belgium | King Baudouin Stadium | H.E.R. Lous and the Yakuza | 224,719 / 224,719 | $20,007,105 |
| 6 August | Brussels | Belgium | King Baudouin Stadium | H.E.R. Lous and the Yakuza | 224,719 / 224,719 | $20,007,105 |
| 8 August | Brussels | Belgium | King Baudouin Stadium | London Grammar; Lous and the Yakuza | 224,719 / 224,719 | $20,007,105 |
| 9 August | Brussels | Belgium | King Baudouin Stadium | London Grammar; Lous and the Yakuza | 224,719 / 224,719 | $20,007,105 |
| 12 August | London | England | Wembley Stadium | H.E.R. Griff | 464,839 / 464,839 | $49,209,920 |
| 13 August | London | England | Wembley Stadium | H.E.R. Griff | 464,839 / 464,839 | $49,209,920 |
| 16 August | London | England | Wembley Stadium | London Grammar; Ibibio Sound Machine | 464,839 / 464,839 | $49,209,920 |
| 17 August | London | England | Wembley Stadium | H.E.R. Ibibio Sound Machine | 464,839 / 464,839 | $49,209,920 |
| 20 August | London | England | Wembley Stadium | London Grammar; Laura Mvula | 464,839 / 464,839 | $49,209,920 |
| 21 August (Note: The concert in London on 21 August 2022 was originally planned for 19 August 2022, but it was rescheduled due to a London Underground strike.) | London | England | Wembley Stadium | London Grammar; Laura Mvula | 464,839 / 464,839 | $49,209,920 |
| 23 August | Glasgow | Scotland | Hampden Park | H.E.R. Nina Nesbitt | 106,209 / 106,209 | $10,402,757 |
| 24 August | Glasgow | Scotland | Hampden Park | London Grammar; Nina Nesbitt | 106,209 / 106,209 | $10,402,757 |
| 10 September (Note: The concert in Rio de Janeiro on 10 September 2022 was part of the Rock in Rio festival.) | Rio de Janeiro | Brazil | Barra Olympic Park | —N/a | —N/a | —N/a |
| 13 September (Note: The concert in Lima on 13 September 2022 was originally planned for 20 September 2022, but it was rescheduled due to logistical reasons.) | Lima | Peru | Estadio Nacional del Perú | Camila Cabello; Andrea Martinez | 85,845 / 85,845 | $9,242,799 |
| 14 September | Lima | Peru | Estadio Nacional del Perú | Camila Cabello; Andrea Martinez | 85,845 / 85,845 | $9,242,799 |
| 16 September | Bogotá | Colombia | Estadio El Campín | Camila Cabello; Mabiland | 89,825 / 89,825 | $8,062,927 |
| 17 September | Bogotá | Colombia | Estadio El Campín | Camila Cabello; Mabiland | 89,825 / 89,825 | $8,062,927 |
| 20 September | Santiago | Chile | Estadio Nacional de Chile | Camila Cabello; Princesa Alba | 256,916 / 256,916 | $15,886,887 |
| 21 September | Santiago | Chile | Estadio Nacional de Chile | Camila Cabello; Princesa Alba | 256,916 / 256,916 | $15,886,887 |
| 23 September | Santiago | Chile | Estadio Nacional de Chile | Camila Cabello; Princesa Alba | 256,916 / 256,916 | $15,886,887 |
| 24 September | Santiago | Chile | Estadio Nacional de Chile | Camila Cabello; Princesa Alba | 256,916 / 256,916 | $15,886,887 |
| 25 October | Buenos Aires | Argentina | Estadio River Plate | H.E.R. Zoe Gotusso | 626,841 / 626,841 | $49,695,814 |
| 26 October | Buenos Aires | Argentina | Estadio River Plate | H.E.R. Zoe Gotusso | 626,841 / 626,841 | $49,695,814 |
| 28 October | Buenos Aires | Argentina | Estadio River Plate | H.E.R. Zoe Gotusso | 626,841 / 626,841 | $49,695,814 |
| 29 October | Buenos Aires | Argentina | Estadio River Plate | H.E.R. Zoe Gotusso | 626,841 / 626,841 | $49,695,814 |
| 1 November | Buenos Aires | Argentina | Estadio River Plate | H.E.R. Zoe Gotusso | 626,841 / 626,841 | $49,695,814 |
| 2 November | Buenos Aires | Argentina | Estadio River Plate | H.E.R. Clara Cava | 626,841 / 626,841 | $49,695,814 |
| 4 November | Buenos Aires | Argentina | Estadio River Plate | H.E.R. Zoe Gotusso | 626,841 / 626,841 | $49,695,814 |
| 5 November | Buenos Aires | Argentina | Estadio River Plate | H.E.R. Zoe Gotusso | 626,841 / 626,841 | $49,695,814 |
| 7 November | Buenos Aires | Argentina | Estadio River Plate | H.E.R. Zoe Gotusso | 626,841 / 626,841 | $49,695,814 |
| 8 November | Buenos Aires | Argentina | Estadio River Plate | H.E.R. Zoe Gotusso | 626,841 / 626,841 | $49,695,814 |

List of 2023 concerts
| Date (2023) | City | Country | Venue | Opening acts | Attendance | Revenue |
|---|---|---|---|---|---|---|
| 10 March (Note: The concerts in São Paulo on 10–18 March 2023 were originally planned for 15–22 October 2022 at Allianz Parque, but they were rescheduled due to illness.) | São Paulo | Brazil | Estádio do Morumbi | Chvrches; Elana Dara | 439,651 / 439,651 | $40,104,881 |
| 11 March | São Paulo | Brazil | Estádio do Morumbi | Chvrches; Elana Dara | 439,651 / 439,651 | $40,104,881 |
| 13 March | São Paulo | Brazil | Estádio do Morumbi | Chvrches; Elana Dara | 439,651 / 439,651 | $40,104,881 |
| 14 March | São Paulo | Brazil | Estádio do Morumbi | Chvrches; Elana Dara | 439,651 / 439,651 | $40,104,881 |
| 17 March | São Paulo | Brazil | Estádio do Morumbi | Chvrches; Elana Dara | 439,651 / 439,651 | $40,104,881 |
| 18 March | São Paulo | Brazil | Estádio do Morumbi | Chvrches; Elana Dara | 439,651 / 439,651 | $40,104,881 |
| 21 March | Curitiba | Brazil | Estádio Couto Pereira | Chvrches; Clara x Sofia | 85,776 / 85,776 | $8,126,841 |
| 22 March | Curitiba | Brazil | Estádio Couto Pereira | Chvrches; Clara x Sofia | 85,776 / 85,776 | $8,126,841 |
| 25 March (Note: The concerts in Rio de Janeiro on 25 and 26 March 2023 were originally planned for 11 and 12 October 2022, but they were rescheduled due to illness.) | Rio de Janeiro | Brazil | Estádio Olímpico Nilton Santos | Chvrches; Clara x Sofia | 211,012 / 211,012 | $17,204,664 |
| 26 March | Rio de Janeiro | Brazil | Estádio Olímpico Nilton Santos | Chvrches; Clara x Sofia | 211,012 / 211,012 | $17,204,664 |
| 28 March | Rio de Janeiro | Brazil | Estádio Olímpico Nilton Santos | Chvrches; Clara x Sofia | 211,012 / 211,012 | $17,204,664 |
| 17 May | Coimbra | Portugal | Estádio Cidade de Coimbra | Griff; Bárbara Bandeira | 208,284 / 208,284 | $21,473,885 |
| 18 May | Coimbra | Portugal | Estádio Cidade de Coimbra | Griff; Bárbara Bandeira | 208,284 / 208,284 | $21,473,885 |
| 20 May | Coimbra | Portugal | Estádio Cidade de Coimbra | Griff; Bárbara Bandeira | 208,284 / 208,284 | $21,473,885 |
| 21 May | Coimbra | Portugal | Estádio Cidade de Coimbra | Griff; Bárbara Bandeira | 208,284 / 208,284 | $21,473,885 |
| 24 May | Barcelona | Spain | Estadi Olímpic Lluís Companys | Chvrches; Hinds | 224,761 / 224,761 | $27,262,896 |
| 25 May | Barcelona | Spain | Estadi Olímpic Lluís Companys | Chvrches; Hinds | 224,761 / 224,761 | $27,262,896 |
| 27 May | Barcelona | Spain | Estadi Olímpic Lluís Companys | Chvrches; Ona Mafalda | 224,761 / 224,761 | $27,262,896 |
| 28 May | Barcelona | Spain | Estadi Olímpic Lluís Companys | Chvrches; Ona Mafalda | 224,761 / 224,761 | $27,262,896 |
| 31 May | Manchester | England | Etihad Stadium | Chvrches; Porij | 195,874 / 195,874 | $24,164,085 |
| 1 June | Manchester | England | Etihad Stadium | Chvrches; Porij | 195,874 / 195,874 | $24,164,085 |
| 3 June | Manchester | England | Etihad Stadium | Chvrches; Porij | 195,874 / 195,874 | $24,164,085 |
| 4 June | Manchester | England | Etihad Stadium | Chvrches; Porij | 195,874 / 195,874 | $24,164,085 |
| 6 June | Cardiff | Wales | Principality Stadium | Chvrches; Hana Lili | 119,280 / 119,280 | $14,151,135 |
| 7 June | Cardiff | Wales | Principality Stadium | Chvrches; Hana Lili | 119,280 / 119,280 | $14,151,135 |
| 21 June | Naples | Italy | Stadio Diego Armando Maradona | Chvrches; Laila al Habash | 93,341 / 93,341 | $9,856,532 |
| 22 June | Naples | Italy | Stadio Diego Armando Maradona | Chvrches; Laila al Habash | 93,341 / 93,341 | $9,856,532 |
| 25 June | Milan | Italy | San Siro | Chvrches; Mara Sattei | 249,560 / 249,560 | $29,439,180 |
| 26 June | Milan | Italy | San Siro | Chvrches; Mara Sattei | 249,560 / 249,560 | $29,439,180 |
| 28 June | Milan | Italy | San Siro | Chvrches; Mara Sattei | 249,560 / 249,560 | $29,439,180 |
| 29 June | Milan | Italy | San Siro | Chvrches; Mara Sattei | 249,560 / 249,560 | $29,439,180 |
| 1 July | Zurich | Switzerland | Letzigrund | Griff; Caroline Alves | 95,055 / 95,055 | $14,972,413 |
| 2 July | Zurich | Switzerland | Letzigrund | Griff; Caroline Alves | 95,055 / 95,055 | $14,972,413 |
| 5 July | Copenhagen | Denmark | Parken Stadium | Griff; Oh Land | 98,646 / 98,646 | $12,230,710 |
| 6 July | Copenhagen | Denmark | Parken Stadium | Griff; Oh Land | 98,646 / 98,646 | $12,230,710 |
| 8 July | Gothenburg | Sweden | Ullevi | Griff; Luciia | 267,180 / 267,180 | $26,242,821 |
| 9 July | Gothenburg | Sweden | Ullevi | Griff; Luciia | 267,180 / 267,180 | $26,242,821 |
| 11 July | Gothenburg | Sweden | Ullevi | Griff; Luciia | 267,180 / 267,180 | $26,242,821 |
| 12 July | Gothenburg | Sweden | Ullevi | Griff; Luciia | 267,180 / 267,180 | $26,242,821 |
| 15 July | Amsterdam | Netherlands | Johan Cruyff Arena | Griff; Zoë Tauran | 217,609 / 217,609 | $30,322,573 |
| 16 July | Amsterdam | Netherlands | Johan Cruyff Arena | Griff; Zoë Tauran | 217,609 / 217,609 | $30,322,573 |
| 18 July | Amsterdam | Netherlands | Johan Cruyff Arena | Griff; Zoë Tauran | 217,609 / 217,609 | $30,322,573 |
| 19 July | Amsterdam | Netherlands | Johan Cruyff Arena | Griff; Zoë Tauran | 217,609 / 217,609 | $30,322,573 |
| 20 September | Seattle | United States | Lumen Field | H.E.R. 070 Shake; Bobby Gonz | 60,342 / 60,342 | $8,124,415 |
| 22 September | Vancouver | Canada | BC Place | H.E.R. 070 Shake; Bobby Gonz | 89,645 / 89,645 | $12,405,572 |
| 23 September | Vancouver | Canada | BC Place | H.E.R. 070 Shake; Bobby Gonz | 89,645 / 89,645 | $12,405,572 |
| 27 September | San Diego | United States | Snapdragon Stadium | H.E.R. 070 Shake; Bobby Gonz | 64,130 / 64,130 | $10,355,147 |
| 28 September | San Diego | United States | Snapdragon Stadium | H.E.R. 070 Shake; Bobby Gonz | 64,130 / 64,130 | $10,355,147 |
| 30 September | Pasadena (Note: Labelled as Los Angeles in promotional material.) | United States | Rose Bowl | H.E.R. 070 Shake; Bobby Gonz | 136,043 / 136,043 | $19,019,116 |
| 1 October | Pasadena | United States | Rose Bowl | H.E.R. 070 Shake; Bobby Gonz | 136,043 / 136,043 | $19,019,116 |
| 6 November | Tokyo | Japan | Tokyo Dome | Yoasobi | 97,267 / 97,267 | $13,726,445 |
| 7 November | Tokyo | Japan | Tokyo Dome | Yoasobi | 97,267 / 97,267 | $13,726,445 |
| 11 November | Kaohsiung | Taiwan | Kaohsiung National Stadium | Accusefive | 102,949 / 102,949 | $15,159,017 |
| 12 November | Kaohsiung | Taiwan | Kaohsiung National Stadium | Accusefive | 102,949 / 102,949 | $15,159,017 |
| 15 November | Jakarta | Indonesia | Gelora Bung Karno Stadium | Rahmania Astrini | 78,541 / 78,541 | $13,893,822 |
| 18 November | Perth | Australia | Optus Stadium | Amy Shark; Thelma Plum; Adrian Dzvuke | 125,035 / 125,035 | $13,911,419 |
| 19 November | Perth | Australia | Optus Stadium | Tash Sultana; Thelma Plum; King Ibis | 125,035 / 125,035 | $13,911,419 |
| 22 November | Kuala Lumpur | Malaysia | Bukit Jalil National Stadium | Bunga | 81,387 / 81,387 | $10,918,567 |

List of 2024 concerts
| Date (2024) | City | Country | Venue | Opening acts | Attendance | Revenue |
|---|---|---|---|---|---|---|
| 19 January | Bocaue (Note: Labelled as Manila in promotional material.) | Philippines | Philippine Arena | Jikamarie | 96,079 / 96,079 | $15,425,466 |
| 20 January | Bocaue | Philippines | Philippine Arena | Jikamarie | 96,079 / 96,079 | $15,425,466 |
| 23 January | Singapore | | Singapore National Stadium | Jasmine Sokko; Jinan Laetitia | 321,113 / 321,113 | $43,362,248 |
| 24 January | Singapore | | Singapore National Stadium | Jasmine Sokko; Jinan Laetitia | 321,113 / 321,113 | $43,362,248 |
| 26 January | Singapore | | Singapore National Stadium | Jasmine Sokko; Jinan Laetitia | 321,113 / 321,113 | $43,362,248 |
| 27 January | Singapore | | Singapore National Stadium | Rriley; Jinan Laetitia | 321,113 / 321,113 | $43,362,248 |
| 30 January | Singapore | | Singapore National Stadium | Rriley; Jinan Laetitia | 321,113 / 321,113 | $43,362,248 |
| 31 January | Singapore | | Singapore National Stadium | Rriley; Jinan Laetitia | 321,113 / 321,113 | $43,362,248 |
| 3 February | Bangkok | Thailand | Rajamangala Stadium | Valentina Ploy | 106,027 / 106,027 | $16,878,888 |
| 4 February | Bangkok | Thailand | Rajamangala Stadium | Valentina Ploy | 106,027 / 106,027 | $16,878,888 |
| 8 June | Athens | Greece | Olympic Stadium | Maisie Peters; Antonia Kaouri | 139,459 / 139,459 | $14,659,813 |
| 9 June | Athens | Greece | Olympic Stadium | Maisie Peters; Antonia Kaouri | 139,459 / 139,459 | $14,659,813 |
| 12 June | Bucharest | Romania | Arena Națională | Maisie Peters; Emaa | 105,420 / 105,420 | $11,516,677 |
| 13 June | Bucharest | Romania | Arena Națională | Maisie Peters; Emaa | 105,420 / 105,420 | $11,516,677 |
| 16 June | Budapest | Hungary | Puskás Aréna | Maisie Peters; Solére | 166,771 / 166,771 | $17,042,753 |
| 18 June | Budapest | Hungary | Puskás Aréna | Maisie Peters; Solére | 166,771 / 166,771 | $17,042,753 |
| 19 June | Budapest | Hungary | Puskás Aréna | Maisie Peters; Solére | 166,771 / 166,771 | $17,042,753 |
| 22 June | Décines-Charpieu (Note: Labelled as Lyon in promotional material.) | France | Groupama Stadium | Janelle Monáe; Ronisia | 164,641 / 164,641 | $21,581,208 |
| 23 June | Décines-Charpieu | France | Groupama Stadium | Janelle Monáe; Ronisia | 164,641 / 164,641 | $21,581,208 |
| 25 June | Décines-Charpieu | France | Groupama Stadium | Janelle Monáe; Ronisia | 164,641 / 164,641 | $21,581,208 |
| 29 June (Note: The concert in Pilton on 29 June 2024 was part of the Glastonbury Festival.) | Pilton | England | Worthy Farm | —N/a | —N/a | —N/a |
| 12 July | Rome | Italy | Stadio Olimpico | Janelle Monáe; Rose Villain | 251,771 / 251,771 | $29,378,307 |
| 13 July | Rome | Italy | Stadio Olimpico | Janelle Monáe; Rose Villain | 251,771 / 251,771 | $29,378,307 |
| 15 July | Rome | Italy | Stadio Olimpico | Janelle Monáe; Rose Villain | 251,771 / 251,771 | $29,378,307 |
| 16 July | Rome | Italy | Stadio Olimpico | Janelle Monáe; Rose Villain | 251,771 / 251,771 | $29,378,307 |
| 20 July | Düsseldorf | Germany | Merkur Spiel-Arena | Janelle Monáe; Zoe Wees | 145,402 / 145,402 | $19,465,043 |
| 21 July | Düsseldorf | Germany | Merkur Spiel-Arena | Janelle Monáe; Zoe Wees | 145,402 / 145,402 | $19,465,043 |
| 23 July | Düsseldorf | Germany | Merkur Spiel-Arena | Janelle Monáe; Zoe Wees | 145,402 / 145,402 | $19,465,043 |
| 27 July | Helsinki | Finland | Helsinki Olympic Stadium | Maisie Peters; Alma | 178,033 / 178,033 | $23,311,075 |
| 28 July | Helsinki | Finland | Helsinki Olympic Stadium | Maisie Peters; Alma | 178,033 / 178,033 | $23,311,075 |
| 30 July | Helsinki | Finland | Helsinki Olympic Stadium | Maisie Peters; Alma | 178,033 / 178,033 | $23,311,075 |
| 31 July | Helsinki | Finland | Helsinki Olympic Stadium | Maisie Peters; Alma | 178,033 / 178,033 | $23,311,075 |
| 15 August | Munich | Germany | Olympiastadion | Maggie Rogers; Wilhelmine | 210,192 / 210,192 | $28,587,643 |
| 17 August | Munich | Germany | Olympiastadion | Maggie Rogers; Wilhelmine | 210,192 / 210,192 | $28,587,643 |
| 18 August | Munich | Germany | Olympiastadion | Maggie Rogers; Wilhelmine | 210,192 / 210,192 | $28,587,643 |
| 21 August | Vienna | Austria | Ernst-Happel-Stadion | Maggie Rogers; Oska | 251,399 / 251,399 | $33,030,164 |
| 22 August | Vienna | Austria | Ernst-Happel-Stadion | Maggie Rogers; Oska | 251,399 / 251,399 | $33,030,164 |
| 24 August | Vienna | Austria | Ernst-Happel-Stadion | Maggie Rogers; Oska | 251,399 / 251,399 | $33,030,164 |
| 25 August | Vienna | Austria | Ernst-Happel-Stadion | Maggie Rogers; Oska | 251,399 / 251,399 | $33,030,164 |
| 29 August | Dublin | Ireland | Croke Park | Maggie Rogers; Aby Coulibaly | 329,200 / 329,200 | $49,520,804 |
| 30 August | Dublin | Ireland | Croke Park | Maggie Rogers; Aby Coulibaly | 329,200 / 329,200 | $49,520,804 |
| 1 September | Dublin | Ireland | Croke Park | Maggie Rogers; Aby Coulibaly | 329,200 / 329,200 | $49,520,804 |
| 2 September | Dublin | Ireland | Croke Park | Maggie Rogers; Aby Coulibaly | 329,200 / 329,200 | $49,520,804 |
| 30 October (Note: The concert in Melbourne on 30 October 2024 featured Bill Rahko on the bass instead of Berryman due to illness.) | Melbourne | Australia | Marvel Stadium | Ayra Starr; Emmanuel Kelly; Shone | 229,120 / 229,120 | $28,849,369 |
| 31 October | Melbourne | Australia | Marvel Stadium | Ayra Starr; Emmanuel Kelly; Shone | 229,120 / 229,120 | $28,849,369 |
| 2 November | Melbourne | Australia | Marvel Stadium | Ayra Starr; Emmanuel Kelly; Shone | 229,120 / 229,120 | $28,849,369 |
| 3 November | Melbourne | Australia | Marvel Stadium | Ayra Starr; Emmanuel Kelly; Shone | 229,120 / 229,120 | $28,849,369 |
| 6 November | Sydney | Australia | Accor Stadium | Ayra Starr; Emmanuel Kelly; Shone | 325,072 / 325,072 | $37,848,426 |
| 7 November | Sydney | Australia | Accor Stadium | Ayra Starr; Emmanuel Kelly; Shone | 325,072 / 325,072 | $37,848,426 |
| 9 November | Sydney | Australia | Accor Stadium | Ayra Starr; Emmanuel Kelly; Shone | 325,072 / 325,072 | $37,848,426 |
| 10 November | Sydney | Australia | Accor Stadium | Ayra Starr; Emmanuel Kelly; Shone | 325,072 / 325,072 | $37,848,426 |
| 13 November | Auckland | New Zealand | Eden Park | Ayra Starr; Emmanuel Kelly; Shone | 169,079 / 169,079 | $19,276,353 |
| 15 November | Auckland | New Zealand | Eden Park | Ayra Starr; Emmanuel Kelly; Shone | 169,079 / 169,079 | $19,276,353 |
| 16 November | Auckland | New Zealand | Eden Park | Ayra Starr; Emmanuel Kelly; Shone | 169,079 / 169,079 | $19,276,353 |

List of 2025 concerts
| Date (2025) | City | Country | Venue | Opening acts | Attendance | Revenue |
|---|---|---|---|---|---|---|
| 9 January | Abu Dhabi | United Arab Emirates | Zayed Sports City Stadium | Elyanna; Shone | 203,160 / 203,160 | $28,081,406 |
| 11 January | Abu Dhabi | United Arab Emirates | Zayed Sports City Stadium | Elyanna; Shone | 203,160 / 203,160 | $28,081,406 |
| 12 January | Abu Dhabi | United Arab Emirates | Zayed Sports City Stadium | Elyanna; Shone | 203,160 / 203,160 | $28,081,406 |
| 14 January | Abu Dhabi | United Arab Emirates | Zayed Sports City Stadium | Elyanna; Shone | 203,160 / 203,160 | $28,081,406 |
| 18 January | Navi Mumbai (Note: Labelled as Mumbai in promotional material.) | India | DY Patil Stadium | Jasleen Royal; Elyanna; Shone | 163,711 / 163,711 | $12,819,848 |
| 19 January | Navi Mumbai | India | DY Patil Stadium | Jasleen Royal; Elyanna; Shone | 163,711 / 163,711 | $12,819,848 |
| 21 January | Navi Mumbai | India | DY Patil Stadium | Jasleen Royal; Elyanna; Shone | 163,711 / 163,711 | $12,819,848 |
| 25 January | Ahmedabad | India | Narendra Modi Stadium | Jasleen Royal; Elyanna; Shone | 223,570 / 223,570 | $15,696,814 |
| 26 January | Ahmedabad | India | Narendra Modi Stadium | Jasleen Royal; Elyanna; Shone | 223,570 / 223,570 | $15,696,814 |
| 8 April | Hong Kong | China | Kai Tak Stadium | Marf; Elyanna | 183,980 / 183,980 | $32,941,256 |
| 9 April | Hong Kong | China | Kai Tak Stadium | Marf; Elyanna | 183,980 / 183,980 | $32,941,256 |
| 11 April | Hong Kong | China | Kai Tak Stadium | Marf; Elyanna | 183,980 / 183,980 | $32,941,256 |
| 12 April | Hong Kong | China | Kai Tak Stadium | Marf; Elyanna | 183,980 / 183,980 | $32,941,256 |
| 16 April | Goyang (Note: Labelled as Seoul in promotional material.) | South Korea | Goyang Stadium | Twice; Elyanna | 318,309 / 318,309 | $34,448,581 |
| 18 April | Goyang | South Korea | Goyang Stadium | Twice; Elyanna | 318,309 / 318,309 | $34,448,581 |
| 19 April | Goyang | South Korea | Goyang Stadium | Twice; Elyanna | 318,309 / 318,309 | $34,448,581 |
| 22 April | Goyang | South Korea | Goyang Stadium | Twice; Elyanna | 318,309 / 318,309 | $34,448,581 |
| 24 April | Goyang | South Korea | Goyang Stadium | Twice; Hanroro | 318,309 / 318,309 | $34,448,581 |
| 25 April | Goyang | South Korea | Goyang Stadium | Twice; Hanroro | 318,309 / 318,309 | $34,448,581 |
| 31 May | Stanford | United States | Stanford Stadium | Willow; Elyanna | 87,068 / 87,068 | $13,349,713 |
| 1 June | Stanford | United States | Stanford Stadium | Willow; Elyanna | 87,068 / 87,068 | $13,349,713 |
| 6 June | Paradise (Note: Labelled as Las Vegas in promotional material.) | United States | Allegiant Stadium | Willow; Elyanna | 100,335 / 100,335 | $13,959,982 |
| 7 June | Paradise | United States | Allegiant Stadium | Willow; Elyanna | 100,335 / 100,335 | $13,959,982 |
| 10 June | Denver | United States | Empower Field at Mile High | Willow; Elyanna | 62,580 / 62,580 | $7,827,735 |
| 13 June | El Paso | United States | Sun Bowl | Willow; Elyanna; Jim Ward | 93,816 / 93,816 | $11,796,828 |
| 14 June | El Paso | United States | Sun Bowl | Willow; Elyanna; Jim Ward | 93,816 / 93,816 | $11,796,828 |
| 7 July | Toronto | Canada | Rogers Stadium | Ayra Starr; Elyanna | 207,412 / 207,412 | $27,649,821 |
| 8 July | Toronto | Canada | Rogers Stadium | Ayra Starr; Elyanna | 207,412 / 207,412 | $27,649,821 |
| 11 July | Toronto | Canada | Rogers Stadium | Ayra Starr; Elyanna | 207,412 / 207,412 | $27,649,821 |
| 12 July | Toronto | Canada | Rogers Stadium | Ayra Starr; Elyanna | 207,412 / 207,412 | $27,649,821 |
| 15 July | Foxborough (Note: Labelled as Boston in promotional material.) | United States | Gillette Stadium | Ayra Starr; Elyanna | 112,462 / 112,462 | $15,676,908 |
| 16 July | Foxborough | United States | Gillette Stadium | Ayra Starr; Elyanna | 112,462 / 112,462 | $15,676,908 |
| 19 July | Madison | United States | Camp Randall Stadium | Ayra Starr; Elyanna; Shone | 58,139 / 58,139 | $7,536,623 |
| 22 July | Nashville | United States | Nissan Stadium | Ayra Starr; Elyanna; Bobby Gonz | 55,663 / 55,663 | $6,514,557 |
| 26 July | Miami Gardens (Note: Labelled as Miami in promotional material.) | United States | Hard Rock Stadium | Ayra Starr; Elyanna; Shone | 98,481 / 98,481 | $13,167,393 |
| 27 July | Miami Gardens | United States | Hard Rock Stadium | Ayra Starr; Elyanna; Shone | 98,481 / 98,481 | $13,167,393 |
| 18 August | Kingston upon Hull | England | Craven Park | Ayra Starr; Chiedu Oraka | 46,000 / 46,000 | $6,495,710 |
| 19 August | Kingston upon Hull | England | Craven Park | Ayra Starr; Chiedu Oraka | 46,000 / 46,000 | $6,495,710 |
| 22 August | London | England | Wembley Stadium | Ayra Starr; Elyanna; Gustavo Dudamel | 791,000 / 791,000 | $131,389,430 |
| 23 August | London | England | Wembley Stadium | Ayra Starr; Elyanna; Gustavo Dudamel | 791,000 / 791,000 | $131,389,430 |
| 26 August | London | England | Wembley Stadium | Elyanna; Chloe Qisha; Gustavo Dudamel | 791,000 / 791,000 | $131,389,430 |
| 27 August | London | England | Wembley Stadium | Elyanna; Chloe Qisha; Gustavo Dudamel | 791,000 / 791,000 | $131,389,430 |
| 30 August | London | England | Wembley Stadium | Beabadoobee; Elyanna; Gustavo Dudamel | 791,000 / 791,000 | $131,389,430 |
| 31 August | London | England | Wembley Stadium | Beabadoobee; Elyanna; Gustavo Dudamel | 791,000 / 791,000 | $131,389,430 |
| 3 September | London | England | Wembley Stadium | Tems; Elyanna; Gustavo Dudamel | 791,000 / 791,000 | $131,389,430 |
| 4 September | London | England | Wembley Stadium | Tems; Elyanna; Gustavo Dudamel | 791,000 / 791,000 | $131,389,430 |
| 6 September (Note: The concerts in London on 6 and 12 September 2025 were originally planned for 7 and 8 September 2025, but they were rescheduled due to a London Underground strike.) | London | England | Wembley Stadium | Tems; Elyanna; Gustavo Dudamel | 791,000 / 791,000 | $131,389,430 |
| 12 September | London | England | Wembley Stadium | Elyanna; Chloe Qisha; Andrés Ascanio | 791,000 / 791,000 | $131,389,430 |
| Total | | | | | 13,138,644 / 13,138,644 (100%) | $1,524,423,018 |

== Cancelled shows ==
List of cancelled concerts
| Date (2022) | City | Country | Venue | Reason | Ref. |
|---|---|---|---|---|---|
| 26 April | Inglewood | United States | SoFi Stadium | Logistic and production issues | |
| 30 April | Inglewood | United States | SoFi Stadium | Logistic and production issues | |

== Personnel ==
Credits adapted from the band's official tour book, which was released "In loving memory of Ben Farrey and Steve Strange".

Performing members

- Chris Martin – lead vocals, piano, keyboards, rhythm guitar
- Jonny Buckland – lead guitar, backing vocals, keyboards
- Guy Berryman – bass, backing vocals, keyboards, percussion
- Will Champion – drums, backing vocals, percussion

Management

- Phil Harvey – CEO, manager
- Arlene Moon – manager
- Mandi Frost – manager
- Jonathan Kessler – tour advisor
- Alex Pollock – tour advisor
- Marguerite Nguyen – tour manager
- Orla Clarke – assistant tour manager
- Andy Frost – road manager, head of security
- Kim-Maree Penn – band security
- Dan Green – audio producer
- Rik Simpson – broadcast producer
- Bill Rahko – Pro Tools director
- Chris Salmon – director of communications
- Sam Seager – head of visual content
- Lauren Rauch – management coordinator
- Lauren Evans – physiotherapist
- Valeska Voiges – band chef
- Emma Jane Randall – band assistant
- Jessie Collins – band assistant
- Claire Finbow – band assistant
- Ria Sioux Byers – band tour assistant
- Jen Milkis – assistant to Phil Harvey, creative coordinator
- Luke Howell – sustainability officer
- Bertie Knutzen – head of philanthropy
- Debs Wild – web ambassador

Audio

- Tony Smith – audio director
- Chris Wood – monitor engineer
- Nick Davis – monitor tech
- Ali Viles – RF tech
- James Smallwood – audio tech, RF tech assistant
- Matt Latham – studio tech
- Nick Mooney – audio crew chief

Audio crew

- Suzy Mucciarone
- Alex Hadjigeorgiou
- Dom Thorne
- Don Parks
- Simon Hall
- Joe Simmons
- Tim Grant
- Georgios Mavreas
- Alex Martinez

Wristbands

- Samantha Torres – lead pixel manager, crew chief
- Garrett Fleming – pixel manager
- Stuart Earnshaw – technician
- Alex Huggins – technician

Video

- Ant Barrett – multi camera director
- Josh Koffman – screens director
- Phil "Lippy" Johnston – video crew chief
- Pieter Laleman – head of LED
- Piotr Klimczyk – engineer, vision
- Chris Farrants – engineer, vision
- Owen Evans – engineer, media servers

Video crew

- Drew Welker – camera supervisor
- Gordon Davies – camera
- Micah Williams – camera
- Manan Patel – camera, AV tech
- Tina Clay – camera, AV tech
- Lisa Baker – camera, LED
- James Cronly – camera, LED
- Michael Cordier – camera, LED
- Jens Couckuijt – camera, LED
- Ritchie Cummins – camera, LED
- Maarten Deschacht – LED
- Percy Vermeulen – LED
- Tommy Kerckaert – LED

Video content

- Studio Flint
- Fray Studio
- North House
- Luke Halls Studio
- Victor Scorrano
- Impossible Brief
- Hello Charlie
- Pilar Zeta
- Conner Griffith
- Mixed Emotions London

Merch

- Paul Nolan – merchandise manager
- Martine Wilson – merchandise manager

Communications

- Turner Pollari – crew chief
- Dalton McGuire – radios, IT, communications

Production

- Chris Kansy – production manager
- Jake Berry – production consultant
- Eme Boucher – production coordinator
- Kim Van Loon – production coordinator
- Paul Traynor – stage manager
- Russell Glenn – technical stage manager
- Courtney Eusebio – tour accountant
- Nichole Garcia – ticketing
- Julia Whittle – show caller

Security

- David White – FoH security
- Adrian Murphy – BoH security

Backline

- Laurie Jenkins – crew chief, drum tech
- Craig Hope – guitar tech
- Matt McGinn – guitar tech
- Matt Tagliaferro – guitar tech
- Paul Newman – bass tech
- Eric Harris – keys and digital tech
- Dan Roe – Pro Tools tech
- Neil Cole – piano tech
- Nicolette Santino – Angel Moon

Wardrobe and backstage

- Beth Fenton – band clothing director, stylist
- Tiffany Henry – dressing rooms, grooming, wardrobe
- Fabio Borreani – dressing rooms assistant
- Kylie Morris – dressing rooms hospitality
- Tracy On – sous chef
- Minh Nguyen – utilities
- Michael Raven – laundry
- Poppy Ogilvy – band tour assistant
- Samara Henderson – BoH apprentice

Carpentry

- Flory Turner – head carpenter
- Michael Viehmeyer – inflatables, assistant stage manager

Carpenter crew

- Bryan Humphries
- Andrew Pearson
- Andy Turner
- Jan Legowski
- Steve Carlsen
- Pat Boyd
- Corey Settle

Power

- Mick McGillion – crew chief
- Neil Whybrow – electrician
- James Hardy – electrician
- John Hardy – electrician
- Mark Rennocks – generators operator

Lighting

- Shaheem Litchmore – lighting director
- Emilio Aguilar – FoH tech, operator
- Daric Bassan – lighting crew chief
- Dio Kollia – lighting apprentice

Lighting crew

- Luke Dobson
- Charlie Collins
- Kyle Rutkowski
- Kevin Royan
- Rob Corman-Savage
- Andrew Mueller
- Calvin Mosier
- Michelle Radogna
- Emma Hart
- Zach Boebel

Special effects

- Michael Barrett-Bourmier – crew chief
- Ashley Neal – effects operations, laser programming

Special effects crew

- Michael Hartle
- David Castillo
- Alan Grant
- Brien Carpenter
- Victor Negron
- Steffi Müller
- Thornsten Stein
- Bill Petrina

Design and art direction

- Coldplay
- Pilar Zeta
- Victor Scorrano

Photography and videography

- Marcus Haney
- Stevie Rae Gibbs
- Anna Lee
- P the Chemist

Creative

- Misty Buckley – creative director, production designer
- Richard Olivieri – art director
- Holly Molcher – assistant art director, design draughter
- Gloria Lamb – scenic art director, props
- Grant Draper – creative project manager
- Sooner Routhier – lighting designer
- David Kennedy – SFX effects designer
- Malcolm Birkett – technical set designer
- Leo Flint – video designer
- Dan Trenchard – video programmer
- Matthew Kemp – lighting programmer PixMob
- Luke Davies – assistant video designer

Charity representatives

- Rebecca White – Global Citizen
- Garrick Dawson – Love Button Global Movement
- Océane Bayard – KultureCity

Rigging crew

- Bjorn Melchert (lead rigger)
- Mark Kohorn
- George Werner
- Jonny Ackles

Energy zone

- Michelle Ochoa – automation
- Courtney Dodd – tech
- Shariff Lovett – tech
- Edwin Van Eekhout – energy floors
- Tim Jansen – energy floors
- Tim Benson – batteries

Barricades and cable ramps

- Bjorn Steegen – crew chief
- Koen Daems – tech

Live Nation promoters

- Jared Braverman
- Phil Bowdery
- Casey Green
- Sophia Burn
- Redd Barua-Norton

SJM promoters

- Simon Moran
- Andy Redhead
- Rob Ballantine
- Matt Woolliscroft

Live Nation touring

- Andrew Craig – in tour representative
- Ariel Bojeun – sustainability
- Lau Johannsen – VIP Nation

Booking agents

- Marty Diamond, Larry Webman – North America
- Josh Javor, Hannah Edds – ROW

Legal

- Gavin Maude
- Ryan Vince

Accounting

- Lester Dales
- Paul Makin
- Donna Nixon
- Shelley Goldin

Business management

- David Weise
- Rob Salzman
- Glenn Frank
- Dina Demas
- Diana Clark

Steel and advance

- Bart Durbin – site coordinator
- Robert Hale – site coordinator
- Erik Ehn – backstage advance coordinator
- Ross Brown – catering advance
- Samantha Smith – catering advance
- Chris Salmon – tour book words
- RabbitHole – tour book design

== See also ==
- List of Coldplay live performances
- List of Billboard Boxscore number-one concert series of the 2020s
- List of highest-grossing live music artists
- List of highest-grossing concert series at a single venue
- List of most-attended concert series at a single venue

== Notes ==
Cities

Others
