= List of awards and nominations received by Coldplay =

Accolades of British band

Coldplay awards and nominations
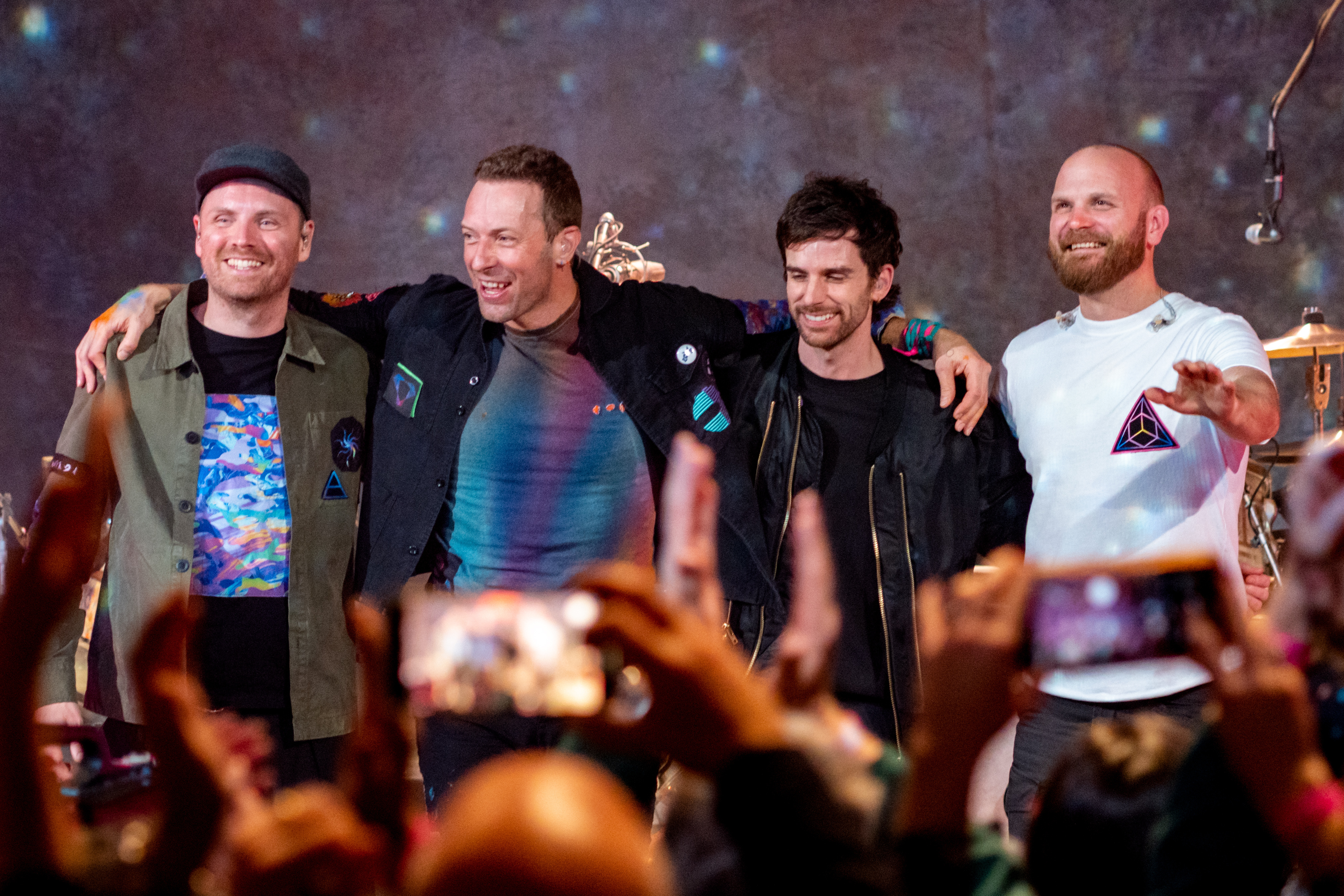
- Coldplay at Broadcasting House in 2021
Awards and nominations
Award	Wins	Nominations
American Music Awards	2	12
ASCAP London	25	25
Billboard Music Awards	9	30
Brit Awards	9	32
Cannes Lions	3	8
Circle Chart Music Awards	1	1
Clio Awards	7	7
Critics' Choice Awards	0	1
Echo Music Prize	4	8
Edison Awards	1	2
Fryderyk Awards	1	4
Gaffa Awards	18	31
Golden Globe Awards	0	1
Grammy Awards	7	39
Hito Music Awards	2	2
Hungarian Music Awards	1	9
Ivor Novello Awards	3	15
Japan Gold Disc Awards	3	3
Juno Awards	3	4
Los 40 Music Awards	3	15
Lunas del Auditorio	3	4
MAMA Awards	0	2
Melon Music Awards	1	2
Mercury Prize	0	3
MTV Europe Music Awards	8	31
MTV Video Music Awards	8	32
Musa Awards	2	2
Music Awards Japan	1	1
NME Awards	8	25
NRJ Music Awards	6	21
Premios Ondas	2	2
Premios Oye!	3	6
Q Awards	6	30
Swiss Music Awards	3	7
Webby Awards	9	10
Žebřík Music Awards	29	51

Totals (Note: Certain award groups do not simply award one winner. They acknowledge several different recipients, have runners-up, and have third place. Since this is a specific recognition and is different from losing an award, runner-up mentions are considered wins in this award tally. For simplification and to avoid errors, each award in this list has been presumed to have had a prior nomination.)
- Wins: 534
- Nominations: 1,091

British rock band Coldplay have received numerous industry awards and honorary accolades over the years. They were formed in London in 1997 by vocalist and pianist Chris Martin, guitarist Jonny Buckland, bassist Guy Berryman, drummer Will Champion and manager Phil Harvey. Their distinctions at the Brit Awards include having the most victories and nominations for a band in British Album of the Year (3 out of 6), British Group (4 out of 10), and overall (9 out of 32). Coldplay have earned 25 ASCAP London Music Awards and three Ivor Novello Awards as well, most notably Songwriters of the Year at both events. Their eight NME Awards culminated in the Godlike Genius trophy. The band also won six Q Awards and were Mercury Prize finalists thrice.

They received seven Grammy Awards from 39 nominations, the most for a British group after the Beatles. Recognitions span the alternative, rock and pop categories. In the Big Four, Coldplay picked up Record of the Year for "Clocks" in 2004; Song of the Year for "Viva la Vida" in 2009; and were considered for Album of the Year on three occasions. Further accolades include nine Billboard Music Awards, eight MTV Video Music Awards and two American Music Awards. The band took home nine Webby Awards as well, factoring honorary certificates. Two of their seven Clio Awards met the criteria for Gold level. Since 2006, they collected three Juno Awards for International Album of the Year, a record among foreign acts.

Coldplay also garnered eight MTV Europe Music Awards, while their 31 nominations are unprecedented for a band. Elsewhere in the region, they have been praised as the recipients of six NRJ Music Awards, four Echo Music Prizes, three Los 40 Music Awards and two Premios Ondas. A Rush of Blood to the Head (2002) is a Foreign Modern Rock Album of the Year winner at the Hungarian Music Awards. X&Y (2005) picked up Edison and Fryderyk honours in equivalent categories. Ghost Stories (2014) marked the first of three cumulative victories at the Swiss Music Awards. Their 18 Gaffa Awards and 29 Žebřík Music Awards include laurels Martin secured on his own. Additionally, works related to the group account for three Cannes Lions.

Viva la Vida or Death and All His Friends (2008) earned two Japan Gold Disc Awards, which were complemented by a third distinction for "My Universe" (2021). Coldplay have landed Circle Chart, Melon Music and MAMA Award nominations as well, taking home the former two. In 2025, "Feelslikeimfallinginlove" notched their first Best International Rock Song prize at the Music Awards Japan. It also became the second track from the band to claim Western Song of the Year at the Hito Music Awards. Lunas del Auditorio and Premios Oye! voters recognised them with three accolades each, while the Musa Awards committee granted two wins. Coldplay ventured into the film industry at times, rising to Critics' Choice and Golden Globe nominee status. "Atlas" (2013) and "Miracles" (2014) were both shortlisted for the Academy Awards. Several organisations provided the group cultural honours, including but not limited to an Earth Day Ambassador Award, the Key to the City of El Paso and Champion's honorary degree as Doctor of Music at the University of Southampton.

== Awards and nominations ==
List of awards and nominations
Ceremony	Year (Note: Indicates the year of ceremony. Each year is linked to the article about the awards held that year whenever possible.)	Recipient	Category	Result	Ref.
4Music Video Honours	2011	"Every Teardrop Is a Waterfall"	Best Video	Nominated	
4Music Video Honours	2012	"Princess of China" (w/ Rihanna)	Best Video	Nominated	
Access All Areas Awards (Note: The Access All Areas Awards was established in 2022 to honour excellence in live entertainment based on a peer-voted selection process.)	2025	Music of the Spheres World Tour	Live Event of the Year – Middle East & Africa	Won	
ADC Awards	2022	A Future Begins	Motion/Film/Gaming Craft: Use of Music/Sound	Bronze	
AICE Awards	2015	"Magic"	Music Video	Won	
AICP Post Awards	2015	"Magic"	Music Video	Won	
AICP Show	2017	"Up&Up"	Music Video	Won	
AICP Show	2025	"All My Love"	Performance	Won	
American Music Awards	2003	Coldplay	Favorite Alternative Artist	Nominated	
American Music Awards	2005	Coldplay	Favorite Alternative Artist	Nominated	
American Music Awards	2008	Coldplay	Artist of the Year	Nominated	
American Music Awards	2008	Coldplay	Favorite Pop/Rock Band, Duo or Group	Nominated	
American Music Awards	2008	Coldplay	Favorite Alternative Artist	Nominated	
American Music Awards	2008	Viva la Vida or Death and All His Friends	Favorite Pop/Rock Album	Nominated	
American Music Awards	2016	Coldplay	Favorite Alternative Artist	Nominated	
American Music Awards	2017	Coldplay	Favorite Pop/Rock Band, Duo or Group	Nominated	
American Music Awards	2017	A Head Full of Dreams Tour	Tour of the Year	Won	
American Music Awards	2022	Coldplay	Best Pop Duo or Group	Nominated	
American Music Awards	2022	Coldplay	Favorite Touring Artist	Won	
American Music Awards	2022	Music of the Spheres	Favorite Rock Album	Nominated	
Anděl Awards	2009	Viva la Vida or Death and All His Friends	Foreign Album of the Year	Won	
Andy Awards	2017	"Up&Up"	Video/Cinema – Direction	Bronze	
Andy Awards	2017	"Up&Up"	Video/Cinema – Special Effects	Silver	
Anibar Animation Festival	2025	"Feelslikeimfallinginlove"	Animated Music Video	Won	
Annie Awards	2025	"Feelslikeimfallinginlove"	Best Sponsored	Nominated	
APRA Awards	2007	"Talk"	Most Performed Foreign Work	Nominated	
APRA Awards	2013	"Paradise"	International Work of the Year	Nominated	
APRA Awards	2018	"Something Just Like This" (w/ the Chainsmokers)	International Work of the Year	Nominated	
ARIA Music Awards	2012	Coldplay	Best International Artist	Nominated	
ARIA Music Awards	2014	Coldplay	Best International Artist	Nominated	
ARIA Music Awards	2016	Coldplay	Best International Artist	Nominated	
ARIA Number 1 Chart Awards	2002	A Rush of Blood to the Head	Number 1 Album	Won	
ARIA Number 1 Chart Awards	2005	X&Y	Number 1 Album	Won	
ARIA Number 1 Chart Awards	2008	Viva la Vida or Death and All His Friends	Number 1 Album	Won	
ARIA Number 1 Chart Awards	2011	Mylo Xyloto	Number 1 Album	Won	
ARIA Number 1 Chart Awards	2014	Ghost Stories	Number 1 Album	Won	
ARIA Number 1 Chart Awards	2019	Everyday Life	Number 1 Album	Won	
ARIA Number 1 Chart Awards	2021	Music of the Spheres	Number 1 Album	Won	
ARIA Number 1 Chart Awards	2024	Moon Music	Number 1 Album	Won	
Arqiva Commercial Radio Awards	2013	Coldplay	PPL Most Played UK Artist on Commercial Radio	Won	
The Arthur Awards	2021	A Head Full of Dreams Tour	Tour of the Decade	Nominated	
The Arthur Awards	2026	Music of the Spheres World Tour	Top Tour	Nominated	
ASCAP London Music Awards	2002	"Yellow"	Award-Winning Songs	Won	
ASCAP London Music Awards	2003	"In My Place"	Award-Winning Songs	Won	
ASCAP London Music Awards	2004	"Clocks"	Award-Winning Songs	Won	
ASCAP London Music Awards	2005	"Clocks"	Award-Winning Songs	Won	
ASCAP London Music Awards	2006	"Speed of Sound"	Song of the Year	Won	
ASCAP London Music Awards	2006	"Speed of Sound"	Award-Winning Songs	Won	
ASCAP London Music Awards	2006	"Clocks"	Award-Winning Songs	Won	
ASCAP London Music Awards	2007	"Clocks"	Award-Winning Songs	Won	
ASCAP London Music Awards	2007	"Talk"	Award-Winning Songs	Won	
ASCAP London Music Awards	2009	"Viva la Vida"	Song of the Year	Won	
ASCAP London Music Awards	2009	"Viva la Vida"	Award-Winning Songs	Won	
ASCAP London Music Awards	2010	Coldplay	Songwriters of the Year	Won	
ASCAP London Music Awards	2010	"Viva la Vida"	Song of the Year	Won	
ASCAP London Music Awards	2010	"Viva la Vida"	Award-Winning Songs	Won	
ASCAP London Music Awards	2011	"Viva la Vida"	Award-Winning Songs	Won	
ASCAP London Music Awards	2012	"Viva la Vida"	Award-Winning Songs	Won	
ASCAP London Music Awards	2012	"Every Teardrop Is a Waterfall"	Award-Winning Songs	Won	
ASCAP London Music Awards	2012	"Paradise"	Award-Winning Songs	Won	
ASCAP London Music Awards	2013	"Viva la Vida"	Award-Winning Songs	Won	
ASCAP London Music Awards	2013	"Paradise"	Award-Winning Songs	Won	
ASCAP London Music Awards	2014	"Viva la Vida"	Award-Winning Songs	Won	
ASCAP London Music Awards	2014	"Paradise"	Award-Winning Songs	Won	
ASCAP London Music Awards	2016	"A Sky Full of Stars"	EDM-Winning Songs	Won	
ASCAP London Music Awards	2017	"Adventure of a Lifetime"	Hot 100-Winning Songs	Won	
ASCAP London Music Awards	2017	"Hymn for the Weekend"	Hot 100-Winning Songs	Won	
ASCAP Pop Music Awards	2004	"Clocks"	Most Performed Songs	Won	
ASCAP Pop Music Awards	2006	"Speed of Sound"	Most Performed Songs	Won	
ASCAP Pop Music Awards	2009	"Viva la Vida"	Most Performed Songs	Won	
ASCAP Pop Music Awards	2010	"Viva la Vida"	Most Performed Songs	Won	
ASCAP Pop Music Awards	2015	"A Sky Full of Stars"	Most Performed Songs	Won	
ASCAP Pop Music Awards	2018	"Something Just Like This" (w/ the Chainsmokers)	Most Performed Songs	Won	
ASCAP Pop Music Awards	2019	"Something Just Like This" (w/ the Chainsmokers)	Most Performed Songs	Won	
ASTRA Awards	2009	Max Masters: Coldplay	Outstanding Music Program or Coverage	Won	
Awwwards	2018	Coldplay Timeline	Best Website	Nominated	
BBC Music Awards	2014	"A Sky Full of Stars"	Song of the Year	Nominated	
BBC Music Awards	2016	Coldplay	British Artist of the Year	Won	
BBC Music Awards	2016	A Head Full of Dreams	Album of the Year	Nominated	
BBC Music Awards	2016	"Hymn for the Weekend"	Song of the Year	Nominated	
BBC Radio 1 Teen Awards	2011	Coldplay	Best British Music Act	Nominated	
BBC Radio 1 Teen Awards	2012	Mylo Xyloto	Best British Album	Nominated	
Billboard Live Music Awards	2005	Coldplay	Breakthrough Act	Nominated	
Billboard Live Music Awards	2016	A Head Full of Dreams Tour	Top Draw	Won	
Billboard Live Music Awards	2016	A Head Full of Dreams Tour	Top Tour	Nominated	
Billboard Live Music Awards	2016	Wembley Stadium, 15–19 June 2016	Top Boxscore	Won	
Billboard Live Music Awards	2017	A Head Full of Dreams Tour	Top Draw	Nominated	
Billboard Live Music Awards	2017	A Head Full of Dreams Tour	Top Tour	Nominated	
Billboard Music Awards	2003	"Clocks"	Digital Track of the Year	Nominated	
Billboard Music Awards	2012	Coldplay	Top Duo/Group	Nominated	
Billboard Music Awards	2012	Coldplay	Top Rock Artist	Won	
Billboard Music Awards	2012	Coldplay	Top Alternative Artist	Won	
Billboard Music Awards	2012	Mylo Xyloto	Top Rock Album	Won	
Billboard Music Awards	2012	Mylo Xyloto	Top Alternative Album	Won	
Billboard Music Awards	2012	"Paradise"	Top Rock Song	Nominated	
Billboard Music Awards	2012	"Paradise"	Top Alternative Song	Nominated	
Billboard Music Awards	2013	Coldplay	Top Duo/Group	Nominated	
Billboard Music Awards	2013	Coldplay	Top Touring Artist	Nominated	
Billboard Music Awards	2013	Coldplay	Top Rock Artist	Nominated	
Billboard Music Awards	2015	Coldplay	Top Rock Artist	Nominated	
Billboard Music Awards	2015	Ghost Stories	Top Rock Album	Won	
Billboard Music Awards	2015	"A Sky Full of Stars"	Top Rock Song	Nominated	
Billboard Music Awards	2016	A Head Full of Dreams	Top Rock Album	Nominated	
Billboard Music Awards	2017	Coldplay	Top Duo/Group	Nominated	
Billboard Music Awards	2017	Coldplay	Top Touring Artist	Nominated	
Billboard Music Awards	2017	Coldplay	Top Rock Artist	Nominated	
Billboard Music Awards	2017	A Head Full of Dreams Tour	Top Rock Tour	Won	
Billboard Music Awards	2018	Coldplay	Top Duo/Group	Nominated	
Billboard Music Awards	2018	Coldplay	Top Touring Artist	Nominated	
Billboard Music Awards	2018	A Head Full of Dreams Tour	Top Rock Tour	Nominated	
Billboard Music Awards	2018	"Something Just Like This" (w/ the Chainsmokers)	Top Radio Song	Nominated	
Billboard Music Awards	2018	"Something Just Like This" (w/ the Chainsmokers)	Top Collaboration	Nominated	
Billboard Music Awards	2018	"Something Just Like This" (w/ the Chainsmokers)	Top Dance/Electronic Song	Won	
Billboard Music Awards	2022	Music of the Spheres	Top Rock Album	Nominated	
Billboard Music Awards	2022	"My Universe" (w/ BTS)	Top Rock Song	Nominated	
Billboard Music Awards	2023	Coldplay	Top Rock Touring Artist	Won	
Billboard Music Awards	2024	Coldplay	Top Duo/Group	Nominated	
Billboard Music Awards	2024	Coldplay	Top Rock Touring Artist	Won	
Bizarre Awards	2002	Coldplay	Best Band	Won	
Bizarre Awards	2002	Coldplay	Best Live Act	Won	
Bizarre Awards	2002	A Rush of Blood to the Head	Best Album	Won	
Bizarre Awards	2005	Coldplay	Best Band	Won	
Bizarre Awards	2005	X&Y	Best Album	Won	
Bizarre Awards	2008	Coldplay	Best Rock	Won	
Bizarre Awards	2011	Mylo Xyloto	Best Album	Nominated	
BreakTudo Awards	2017	Coldplay	Best Group	Nominated	
BreakTudo Awards	2022	"Let Somebody Go" (w/ Selena Gomez)	Best International Video	Nominated	
Brit Awards	2001	Coldplay	British Group	Won	
Brit Awards	2001	Coldplay	British Breakthrough Act	Nominated	
Brit Awards	2001	Parachutes	British Album of the Year	Won	
Brit Awards	2001	"Yellow"	British Single of the Year	Nominated	
Brit Awards	2001	"Yellow"	British Video of the Year	Nominated	
Brit Awards	2002	"Trouble"	British Video of the Year	Nominated	
Brit Awards	2003	Coldplay	British Group	Won	
Brit Awards	2003	A Rush of Blood to the Head	British Album of the Year	Won	
Brit Awards	2006	Coldplay	British Group	Nominated	
Brit Awards	2006	Coldplay	British Live Act	Nominated	
Brit Awards	2006	X&Y	British Album of the Year	Won	
Brit Awards	2006	"Speed of Sound"	British Single of the Year	Won	
Brit Awards	2009	Coldplay	British Group	Nominated	
Brit Awards	2009	Coldplay	British Live Act	Nominated	
Brit Awards	2009	Viva la Vida or Death and All His Friends	British Album of the Year	Nominated	
Brit Awards	2009	"Viva la Vida"	British Single of the Year	Nominated	
Brit Awards	2010	A Rush of Blood to the Head	British Album – Last 30 Years	Nominated	
Brit Awards	2010	"Clocks"	British Live Performance – Last 30 Years	Nominated	
Brit Awards	2012	Coldplay	British Group	Won	
Brit Awards	2012	Mylo Xyloto	British Album of the Year	Nominated	
Brit Awards	2013	Coldplay	British Live Act	Won	
Brit Awards	2013	"Princess of China" (w/ Rihanna)	British Single of the Year	Nominated	
Brit Awards	2015	Coldplay	British Group	Nominated	
Brit Awards	2016	Coldplay	British Group	Won	
Brit Awards	2016	A Head Full of Dreams	British Album of the Year	Nominated	
Brit Awards	2017	"Hymn for the Weekend"	British Single of the Year	Nominated	
Brit Awards	2017	"Hymn for the Weekend"	British Video of the Year	Nominated	
Brit Awards	2020	Coldplay	British Group	Nominated	
Brit Awards	2022	Coldplay	British Group	Nominated	
Brit Awards	2022	Coldplay	British Alternative/Rock Act	Nominated	
Brit Awards	2025	Coldplay	British Group	Nominated	
Brit Awards	2025	"Feelslikeimfallinginlove"	Song of the Year	Nominated	
British Animation Awards	2002	"Don't Panic"	Public Choice – Music Video	Won	
British Animation Awards	2020	"Daddy"	Best Music Video	Won	
British Phonographic Industry	2023	Coldplay	Brit Billion Award	Won	
Broadcast Awards	2015	Coldplay: Ghost Stories	Best Music Programme	Won	
Broadcast Digital Awards	2020	Coldplay: Everyday Life – Live in Jordan	Best Sports or Live Event Coverage	Nominated	
BT Digital Music Awards	2002	Coldplay	Artist of the Year	Nominated	
BT Digital Music Awards	2004	"2000 Miles"	Best Artist Download	Won	
BT Digital Music Awards	2005	Coldplay	Best Official Site	Won	
BT Digital Music Awards	2005	Coldplay	Best Digital Music Community	Won	
BT Digital Music Awards	2008	Coldplay	Artist of the Year	Nominated	
BT Digital Music Awards	2008	Coldplay	Best Rock/Indie Artist	Won	
BT Digital Music Awards	2008	Coldplay	Best Official Music Website	Won	
BT Digital Music Awards	2008	Coldplaying	Best Unofficial Music Site	Nominated	
BT Digital Music Awards	2010	Coldplay	Best Official Site	Nominated	
BT Digital Music Awards	2010	Coldplaying	Best Fan Site	Nominated	
BT Digital Music Awards	2011	Coldplay	Best Official Site	Won	
BT Digital Music Awards	2011	Coldplaying	Best Fan Site	Won	
Buenos Aires Music Video Festival (Note: The Buenos Aires Music Video Festival was established in 2019 to honour excellence in music video craft based on a peer-voted selection process.)	2021	"Higher Power"	Best Visual Effects	Nominated	
Buenos Aires Music Video Festival	2021	"My Universe" (w/ BTS)	Favorite Video	Nominated	
Buenos Aires Music Video Festival	2021	"My Universe" (w/ BTS)	Favorite Kpop Video	Nominated	
Buenos Aires Music Video Festival	2021	"My Universe" (w/ BTS)	Best Lyric Video	Nominated	
Camerimage	2009	"Strawberry Swing"	Best Music Video	Nominated	
Camerimage	2009	"Strawberry Swing"	Best Cinematography in a Music Video	Nominated	
Camerimage	2012	"Paradise"	Best Music Video	Nominated	
Camerimage	2014	"Magic"	Best Music Video	Nominated	
Camerimage	2016	"Up&Up"	Best Music Video	Nominated	
Camerimage	2016	"Up&Up"	Best Cinematography in a Music Video	Nominated	
Camerimage	2020	"Champion of the World"	Best Music Video	Nominated	
Camerimage	2020	"Champion of the World"	Best Cinematography in a Music Video	Nominated	
Cannes Lions	2012	Back to the Start	Best Use of Music	Silver	
Cannes Lions	2016	"Adventure of a Lifetime" (w/ Beats)	Music Video – Brand and/or Product Integration	Nominated	
Cannes Lions	2017	"Up&Up"	Excellence in Music Video	Silver	
Cannes Lions	2017	"Up&Up"	Visual Effects	Silver	
Cannes Lions	2018	Coldplay: Unframed	Innovation in Branded Content	Nominated	
Cannes Lions	2022	A Future Begins	Use of Licensed/Adapted Music	Nominated	
Cannes Lions	2022	A Future Begins	Artist Content in Partnership with a Brand or a Cause	Nominated	
Cannes Lions	2025	"All My Love"	Media/Entertainment	Nominated	
Capital FM Awards	2003	Coldplay	London's Favourite Band	Won	
Capital FM Awards	2003	Coldplay	Favourite Music Website	Nominated	
Capital FM Awards	2003	A Rush of Blood to the Head	Capital Album Chart Award	Nominated	
Ciclope Festival	2016	"Up&Up"	Music Video – Direction	Nominated	
Ciclope Festival	2016	"Up&Up"	Music Video – Visual Effects	Gold	
Ciclope Festival	2020	"Trouble in Town"	Music Video	Nominated	
Ciclope Festival	2024	"Feelslikeimfallinginlove"	Music Video – Animation	Nominated	
Circle Chart Music Awards	2022	"My Universe" (w/ BTS)	Song of the Year – Digital Music (September)	Won	
Clio Awards	2012	Back to the Start	Film – Adapted Music	Gold	
Clio Awards	2020	"Daddy"	Film/Video Craft – Direction	Silver	
Clio Awards	2020	"Daddy"	Film/Video Craft – Animation	Silver	
Clio Awards	2022	A Future Begins	Use of Music in Film/Video – 61 Seconds to Five Minutes	Silver	
Clio Awards	2025	Moon Music	Design – Sustainability	Gold	
Clio Awards	2026	Moon Music (w/ Roblox)	Experience/Activation – Immersive/New Realities	Silver	
Clio Awards	2026	A Film for the Future (w/ Lightroom)	Experience/Activation – Immersive/New Realities	Bronze	
Creative Review Annual Awards	2020	"Daddy"	Entertainment – Music Video	Nominated	
Creative Review Annual Awards	2025	"Alien Hits / Alien Radio"	Entertainment – Music Video	Nominated	
Critics' Choice Movie Awards	2014	"Atlas"	Best Song	Nominated	
D&AD Awards	2002	"Don't Panic"	Music Video: Animation – Wood Pencil	Won	
D&AD Awards	2003	"The Scientist"	Music Video: Direction – Wood Pencil	Won	
D&AD Awards	2010	"Strawberry Swing"	Music Video: General Field – Graphite Pencil	Won	
D&AD Awards	2010	"Strawberry Swing"	Music Video: Animation – Yellow Pencil	Won	
D&AD Awards	2012	Back to the Start	Film Advertising Crafts: Use of Music – Wood Pencil	Won	
D&AD Awards	2017	"Up&Up"	Music Video: General Field – Wood Pencil	Won	
D&AD Awards	2017	"Up&Up"	Music Video: Special Effects – Graphite Pencil	Won	
D&AD Awards	2021	"Trouble in Town"	Music Video: Direction	Nominated	
Danish Music Awards	2001	Coldplay	Foreign Newcomer of the Year	Nominated	
Danish Music Awards	2003	A Rush of Blood to the Head	International Album of the Year	Nominated	
Danish Music Awards	2009	Viva la Vida or Death and All His Friends	International Album of the Year	Nominated	
Danish Music Awards	2012	Mylo Xyloto	International Album of the Year	Nominated	
Denver Film Critics Society	2014	"Atlas"	Best Original Song	Nominated	
Digiday Media Awards	2025	Moon Music (w/ Roblox)	Best Gaming/Esports Brand Activation	Won	
Digiday Media Awards	2025	Moon Music (w/ Roblox)	Best Use of Emerging Tech	Nominated	
Digital Spy Reader Awards	2011	Coldplay	Best Rock Band	1st place	
Digital Spy Reader Awards	2014	Coldplay	Best Group	3rd place	
Echo Music Prize	2003	Coldplay	Best International Alternative Group	Nominated	
Echo Music Prize	2004	Coldplay	International Group of the Year	Nominated	
Echo Music Prize	2004	Coldplay	Best International Alternative Group	Nominated	
Echo Music Prize	2006	Coldplay	International Group of the Year	Won	
Echo Music Prize	2009	Coldplay	Best International Rock/Pop Group	Won	
Echo Music Prize	2012	Coldplay	Best International Rock/Pop Group	Won	
Echo Music Prize	2015	Coldplay	Best International Rock/Pop Group	Nominated	
Echo Music Prize	2016	Coldplay	Best International Rock/Pop Group	Won	
Edison Awards	2003	A Rush of Blood to the Head	Best International Group Album	Nominated	
Edison Awards	2006	X&Y	Best International Group Album	Won	
Emma Gaala	2006	Coldplay	Foreign Artist of the Year	Nominated	
Emma Gaala	2009	Coldplay	Foreign Artist of the Year	Nominated	
Emma Gaala	2012	Coldplay	Foreign Artist of the Year	Nominated	
Empik Bestsellers Awards	2015	Ghost Stories	Foreign Music	Nominated	
Empik Bestsellers Awards	2016	A Head Full of Dreams	Foreign Music	Nominated	
European Festival Awards	2009	"Viva la Vida"	Festival Anthem of the Year	Won	
European Festival Awards	2011	Coldplay	Best Headliner	Won	
European Festival Awards	2011	"Viva la Vida"	Festival Anthem of the Year	Won	
Fryderyk Awards	2002	A Rush of Blood to the Head	Best Foreign Album	Nominated	
Fryderyk Awards	2005	X&Y	Best Foreign Album	Won	
Fryderyk Awards	2009	Viva la Vida or Death and All His Friends	Best Foreign Album	Nominated	
Fryderyk Awards	2012	Mylo Xyloto	Best Foreign Album	Nominated	
Gaffa Awards (Denmark)	2000	Coldplay	New International Artist of the Year	Won	
Gaffa Awards (Denmark)	2000	Parachutes	International Album of the Year	Nominated	
Gaffa Awards (Denmark)	2000	"Yellow"	International Hit of the Year	Nominated	
Gaffa Awards (Denmark)	2002	Coldplay	International Band of the Year	Won	
Gaffa Awards (Denmark)	2002	Chris Martin	International Male of the Year	Won	
Gaffa Awards (Denmark)	2002	A Rush of Blood to the Head	International Album of the Year	Won	
Gaffa Awards (Denmark)	2002	"In My Place"	International Hit of the Year	Won	
Gaffa Awards (Denmark)	2002	"The Scientist"	International Video of the Year	Won	
Gaffa Awards (Denmark)	2005	Coldplay	International Band of the Year	Won	
Gaffa Awards (Denmark)	2005	Chris Martin	International Male of the Year	Won	
Gaffa Awards (Denmark)	2005	X&Y	International Album of the Year	Won	
Gaffa Awards (Denmark)	2005	"Speed of Sound"	International Hit of the Year	Nominated	
Gaffa Awards (Denmark)	2005	"Fix You"	International Hit of the Year	Won	
Gaffa Awards (Denmark)	2008	Coldplay	International Band of the Year	Nominated	
Gaffa Awards (Denmark)	2008	Chris Martin	International Male of the Year	Won	
Gaffa Awards (Denmark)	2008	Viva la Vida or Death and All His Friends	International Album of the Year	Nominated	
Gaffa Awards (Denmark)	2008	"Viva la Vida"	International Hit of the Year	Nominated	
Gaffa Awards (Denmark)	2011	Coldplay	International Band of the Year	Won	
Gaffa Awards (Denmark)	2011	Chris Martin	International Male of the Year	Nominated	
Gaffa Awards (Denmark)	2011	Mylo Xyloto	International Album of the Year	Nominated	
Gaffa Awards (Denmark)	2011	"Paradise"	International Hit of the Year	Nominated	
Gaffa Awards (Denmark)	2014	Coldplay	International Band of the Year	Won	
Gaffa Awards (Denmark)	2018	Coldplay	International Band of the Year	Won	
Gaffa Awards (Denmark)	2018	Kaleidoscope EP	International Album of the Year	Nominated	
Gaffa Awards (Denmark)	2020	Coldplay	International Band of the Year	Won	
Gaffa Awards (Denmark)	2022	Coldplay	International Band of the Year	Nominated	
Gaffa Awards (Denmark)	2022	"Higher Power"	International Hit of the Year	Nominated	
Gaffa Awards (Sweden)	2011	Coldplay	Best Foreign Band	Won	
Gaffa Awards (Sweden)	2014	Coldplay	Best Foreign Band	Won	
Gaffa Awards (Sweden)	2016	"Hymn for the Weekend"	Best Foreign Song	Won	
Gaffa Awards (Sweden)	2022	"My Universe" (w/ BTS)	Best Foreign Song	Nominated	
Global Awards	2018	Coldplay	Best Group	Nominated	
Global Awards	2020	Coldplay	Best Group	Nominated	
Global Awards	2022	Coldplay	Best Group	Won	
Global Awards	2022	Coldplay	Best British Act	Nominated	
Global Awards	2022	Coldplay	Best Mass Appeal Artist	Nominated	
Global Awards	2023	Coldplay	Best Group	Won	
Global Awards	2023	Coldplay	Best Mass Appeal Artist	Nominated	
Gold Derby Awards	2014	"Atlas"	Best Song	Nominated	
Golden Globe Awards	2014	"Atlas"	Best Original Song	Nominated	
GQ Awards	2005	Coldplay	Band of the Year	Won	
Grammy Awards	2002	Parachutes	Best Alternative Music Album	Won	
Grammy Awards	2002	"Yellow"	Best Rock Song	Nominated	
Grammy Awards	2002	"Yellow"	Best Rock Performance by a Duo or Group with Vocals	Nominated	
Grammy Awards	2003	A Rush of Blood to the Head	Best Alternative Music Album	Won	
Grammy Awards	2003	"In My Place"	Best Rock Performance by a Duo or Group with Vocals	Won	
Grammy Awards	2004	"Clocks"	Record of the Year	Won	
Grammy Awards	2004	"The Scientist"	Best Short Form Music Video	Nominated	
Grammy Awards	2005	Live 2003	Best Long Form Music Video	Nominated	
Grammy Awards	2006	X&Y	Best Rock Album	Nominated	
Grammy Awards	2006	"Speed of Sound"	Best Rock Song	Nominated	
Grammy Awards	2006	"Speed of Sound"	Best Rock Performance by a Duo or Group with Vocals	Nominated	
Grammy Awards	2007	"Talk" (Note: "Talk" (Thin White Duke Mix) also won a Grammy Award for Best Remixed Recording, Non-Classical, credited to producer Jacques Lu Cont.)	Best Rock Performance by a Duo or Group with Vocals	Nominated	
Grammy Awards	2009	Viva la Vida or Death and All His Friends	Album of the Year	Nominated	
Grammy Awards	2009	Viva la Vida or Death and All His Friends	Best Rock Album	Won	
Grammy Awards	2009	"Viva la Vida"	Song of the Year	Won	
Grammy Awards	2009	"Viva la Vida"	Record of the Year	Nominated	
Grammy Awards	2009	"Viva la Vida"	Best Pop Performance by a Duo or Group with Vocals	Won	
Grammy Awards	2009	"Violet Hill"	Best Rock Song	Nominated	
Grammy Awards	2009	"Violet Hill"	Best Rock Performance by a Duo or Group with Vocals	Nominated	
Grammy Awards	2010	"Life in Technicolor II"	Best Rock Performance by a Duo or Group with Vocals	Nominated	
Grammy Awards	2010	"Life in Technicolor II"	Best Short Form Music Video	Nominated	
Grammy Awards	2012	"Paradise"	Best Pop Duo/Group Performance	Nominated	
Grammy Awards	2012	"Every Teardrop Is a Waterfall"	Best Rock Song	Nominated	
Grammy Awards	2012	"Every Teardrop Is a Waterfall"	Best Rock Performance	Nominated	
Grammy Awards	2013	Mylo Xyloto	Best Rock Album	Nominated	
Grammy Awards	2013	"Charlie Brown"	Best Rock Performance	Nominated	
Grammy Awards	2014	"Atlas"	Best Song Written for Visual Media	Nominated	
Grammy Awards	2014	Live 2012	Best Music Film	Nominated	
Grammy Awards	2015	Ghost Stories	Best Pop Vocal Album	Nominated	
Grammy Awards	2015	"A Sky Full of Stars"	Best Pop Duo/Group Performance	Nominated	
Grammy Awards	2015	Ghost Stories Live 2014	Best Music Film	Nominated	
Grammy Awards	2017	"Up&Up"	Best Music Video	Nominated	
Grammy Awards	2018	Kaleidoscope EP	Best Pop Vocal Album	Nominated	
Grammy Awards	2018	"Something Just Like This" (w/ the Chainsmokers)	Best Pop Duo/Group Performance	Nominated	
Grammy Awards	2021	Everyday Life (Note: Everyday Life also received a nomination for Best Recording Package, credited to Argentine art director Pilar Zeta.)	Album of the Year	Nominated	
Grammy Awards	2022	"Higher Power"	Best Pop Duo/Group Performance	Nominated	
Grammy Awards	2023	Music of the Spheres	Album of the Year	Nominated	
Grammy Awards	2023	Music of the Spheres	Best Pop Vocal Album	Nominated	
Grammy Awards	2023	"My Universe" (w/ BTS)	Best Pop Duo/Group Performance	Nominated	
Helpmann Awards	2009	Viva la Vida Tour	Best International Contemporary Concert	Nominated	
Helpmann Awards	2013	Mylo Xyloto Tour	Best International Contemporary Concert	Nominated	
Hit FM Music Awards (Note: The Hit FM Music Awards was held between 2008 and 2025 to honour excellence in Western music based on a public-voted process.)	2009	Coldplay	Band of the Year	Won	
Hit FM Music Awards	2009	"Viva la Vida"	Top 10 Singles of the Year	Won	
Hit FM Music Awards	2012	Coldplay	Group of the Year	Won	
Hit FM Music Awards	2012	"Paradise"	Top 10 Singles of the Year	Won	
Hit FM Music Awards	2015	"A Sky Full of Stars"	Top 10 Singles of the Year	Won	
Hit FM Music Awards	2016	Coldplay	Group of the Year	Won	
Hit FM Music Awards	2017	"Hymn for the Weekend"	Top 10 Singles of the Year	Won	
Hit FM Music Awards	2018	"Something Just Like This" (w/ the Chainsmokers)	Party Song of the Year	Won	
Hit FM Music Awards	2020	Coldplay	Group of the Year	Won	
Hit FM Music Awards	2020	"Orphans"	Rock Single of the Year	Won	
Hit FM Music Awards	2022	Coldplay	Group of the Year	Nominated	
Hit FM Music Awards	2022	"Higher Power"	Top 10 Singles of the Year	Won	
Hit FM Music Awards	2023	Coldplay	Group of the Year	Won	
Hit FM Music Awards	2023	"Biutyful"	Top 10 Singles of the Year	Won	
Hit FM Music Awards	2023	"Biutyful"	Most Creative Dolby Atmos Music Experience	Nominated	
Hit FM Music Awards	2025	Coldplay	Group of the Year	Won	
Hit FM Music Awards	2025	Coldplay	Live Act of the Year	Nominated	
Hito Music Awards	2009	"Viva la Vida"	Western Song of the Year	Won	
Hito Music Awards	2025	"Feelslikeimfallinginlove"	Western Song of the Year	Won	
Hollywood Film Awards	2013	"Atlas"	Hollywood Song Award	Won	
Hollywood Music in Media Awards	2014	"Wish I Was Here"	Best Original Song in a Feature Film	Nominated	
Huading Awards	2016	Coldplay	Best Global Idol Group	Nominated	
Huading Awards	2026	Coldplay	Most Popular Global Group	Won	
Humo's Pop Poll	2003	Coldplay	Best International Group	Won	
Humo's Pop Poll	2004	Coldplay	Best International Group	Won	
Humo's Pop Poll	2004	Chris Martin	Best International Male Singer	Won	
Humo's Pop Poll	2006	Coldplay	Best International Group	Won	
Humo's Pop Poll	2009	Coldplay	Best International Group	Won	
Humo's Pop Poll	2009	Chris Martin	Best International Male Singer	Won	
Humo's Pop Poll	2009	Viva la Vida or Death and All His Friends	Best International Album	Won	
Humo's Pop Poll	2010	Chris Martin	Best International Male Singer	Won	
Humo's Pop Poll	2020	Coldplay	Best International Group	Won	
Humo's Pop Poll	2022	Coldplay	Best International Act	Won	
Hungarian Music Awards	2003	A Rush of Blood to the Head	Foreign Modern Rock Album of the Year	Won	
Hungarian Music Awards	2006	X&Y	Foreign Modern Rock Album of the Year	Nominated	
Hungarian Music Awards	2009	Viva la Vida or Death and All His Friends	Foreign Alternative Album of the Year	Nominated	
Hungarian Music Awards	2013	Live 2012	Foreign Classic Pop/Rock Album of the Year	Nominated	
Hungarian Music Awards	2015	Ghost Stories	Foreign Modern Pop/Rock Album of the Year	Nominated	
Hungarian Music Awards	2016	A Head Full of Dreams	Foreign Alternative/Indie Rock Album of the Year	Nominated	
Hungarian Music Awards	2018	Kaleidoscope EP	Foreign Modern Pop/Rock Album of the Year	Nominated	
Hungarian Music Awards	2018	"Something Just Like This" (w/ the Chainsmokers)	Foreign Electronic Song of the Year	Nominated	
Hungarian Music Awards	2022	Music of the Spheres	Foreign Alternative/Indie Rock Album of the Year	Nominated	
IFPI Awards	2006	X&Y	Global Album of 2005	Won	
IFPI Awards	2009	Viva la Vida or Death and All His Friends	Global Album of 2008	Won	
IFPI Hong Kong Top Sales Awards	2005	X&Y	Top 10 Best-Selling Foreign Albums	Won	
iHeartRadio Music Awards	2017	Coldplay	Best Duo/Group of the Year	Nominated	
iHeartRadio Music Awards	2017	Coldplay	Alternative Rock Artist of the Year	Nominated	
iHeartRadio Music Awards	2017	A Head Full of Dreams Tour	Best Tour	Won	
iHeartRadio Music Awards	2017	"Hymn for the Weekend"	Best Music Video	Nominated	
iHeartRadio Music Awards	2018	"Something Just Like This" (w/ the Chainsmokers)	Song of the Year	Nominated	
iHeartRadio Music Awards	2018	"Something Just Like This" (w/ the Chainsmokers)	Best Collaboration	Won	
iHeartRadio Music Awards	2018	"Something Just Like This" (w/ the Chainsmokers)	Dance Song of the Year	Nominated	
iHeartRadio Music Awards	2018	"Something Just Like This" (w/ the Chainsmokers)	Titanium Award	Won	
iHeartRadio Music Awards	2023	Music of the Spheres World Tour	Tour of the Year	Won	
iHeartRadio Music Awards	2025	Selena Gomez Songbook	Favorite Surprise Guest	Nominated	
iHeartRadio Music Awards	2026	"The Jumbotron Song"	Favorite Tour Tradition	Won	
iHeartRadio Music Awards	2026	"We Pray" (Twice version)	Favorite K-Pop Collab	Nominated	
International Dance Music Awards	2004	"Clocks"	Best Alternative/Rock Dance Track	Won	
International Dance Music Awards	2006	"Speed of Sound"	Best Alternative/Rock Dance Track	Nominated	
International Dance Music Awards	2009	"Viva la Vida"	Best Alternative/Rock Dance Track	Nominated	
International Dance Music Awards	2012	"Paradise" (Fedde Le Grand remix)	Best Alternative/Rock Dance Track	Won	
International Dance Music Awards	2012	"Paradise" (Fedde Le Grand remix)	Best Progressive Track	Nominated	
Italian Music Awards	2001	Coldplay	Best International Group (1st Ceremony)	Nominated	
Italian Music Awards	2001	Coldplay	Best International Group (2nd Ceremony)	Nominated	
Italian Music Awards	2001	"Trouble"	Best International Single (2nd Ceremony)	Won	
Italian Music Awards	2002	Coldplay	Best International Group	Nominated	
Italian Music Awards	2003	Coldplay	Best International Group	Won	
Ivor Novello Awards	2001	"Trouble"	Best Song Musically and Lyrically	Nominated	
Ivor Novello Awards	2003	Coldplay	Songwriters of the Year	Won	
Ivor Novello Awards	2003	"In My Place"	Best Contemporary Song	Nominated	
Ivor Novello Awards	2004	"Clocks"	PRS Most Performed Work	Nominated	
Ivor Novello Awards	2006	"Speed of Sound"	PRS Most Performed Work	Nominated	
Ivor Novello Awards	2006	"Speed of Sound"	International Hit of the Year	Nominated	
Ivor Novello Awards	2006	"Fix You"	Best Song Musically and Lyrically	Nominated	
Ivor Novello Awards	2009	Viva la Vida or Death and All His Friends	Best Album	Nominated	
Ivor Novello Awards	2009	"Viva la Vida"	PRS Most Performed Work	Nominated	
Ivor Novello Awards	2009	"Viva la Vida"	Best-Selling British Song	Won	
Ivor Novello Awards	2013	"Paradise"	PRS Most Performed Work	Nominated	
Ivor Novello Awards	2017	"Adventure of a Lifetime"	PRS Most Performed Work	Nominated	
Ivor Novello Awards	2017	"Hymn for the Weekend"	PRS Most Performed Work	Won	
Ivor Novello Awards	2022	Coldplay	Songwriters of the Year	Nominated	
Ivor Novello Awards	2026	"Viva la Vida"	PRS Most Performed Work	Nominated	
Japan Gold Disc Awards	2009	Viva la Vida or Death and All His Friends	Album of the Year – Western	Won	
Japan Gold Disc Awards	2009	Viva la Vida or Death and All His Friends	Best 3 Albums – Western	Won	
Japan Gold Disc Awards	2022	"My Universe" (w/ BTS)	Song of the Year by Download – Western	Won	
Joox Malaysia Music Awards	2022	"My Universe" (w/ BTS)	International Top 5 Hits	Won	
Juno Awards	2006	X&Y	International Album of the Year	Won	
Juno Awards	2009	Viva la Vida or Death and All His Friends	International Album of the Year	Won	
Juno Awards	2012	Mylo Xyloto	International Album of the Year	Nominated	
Juno Awards	2017	A Head Full of Dreams	International Album of the Year	Won	
Kids' Choice Awards	2010	Coldplay	Favorite Music Group	Nominated	
Kids' Choice Awards	2015	Coldplay	Favorite Music Group	Nominated	
Kids' Choice Awards	2018	Coldplay	Favorite Music Group	Nominated	
Kids' Choice Awards	2024	Coldplay	Favorite Music Group	Nominated	
Kids' Choice Awards	2025	Coldplay	Favorite Music Group	Nominated	
Kids' Choice Awards Mexico	2022	"My Universe" (w/ BTS)	International Hit of the Year	Won	
KKBox Music Awards	2025	Coldplay	Top 100 Artists of the Year	Won	
Las Culturistas Culture Awards	2026	"The Jumbotron Song"	PDA of the Year	Nominated	
LIAF Awards	2024	"Feelslikeimfallinginlove"	Audience Voting – Music Video	Won	
Live UK Music Business Awards (Note: The Live UK Music Business Awards was established in 2010 to honour excellence in live entertainment based on a peer-voted selection process.)	2012	Mylo Xyloto Tour	Spectacle of the Year	Runner-up	
Live UK Music Business Awards	2016	Glastonbury Festival 2016	Spectacle of the Year	Runner-up	
Live UK Music Business Awards	2016	Glastonbury Festival 2016	Best Festival Performance	Won	
London International Awards (Note: The London International Awards was established in 1986 to honour excellence in advertising based on a peer-voted selection process.)	2012	Back to the Start	TV/Cinema/Online Film: Music – Grand LIA	Won	
London International Awards	2012	Back to the Start	TV/Cinema/Online Film: Music – Music Adaptation	Gold	
London International Awards	2012	"Paradise" (Shynola Version)	Music Video – Best Direction	Bronze	
London International Awards	2015	"Ink"	Music Video – Animation	Nominated	
London International Awards	2016	"Up&Up"	Music Video – Grand LIA	Won	
London International Awards	2016	"Up&Up"	Music Video – Best Music Video	Gold	
London International Awards	2016	"Up&Up"	Music Video – Best Direction	Gold	
London International Awards	2022	A Future Begins	Music & Sound – Music Adaptation	Nominated	
Los 40 Music Awards	2008	Coldplay	Best International Act	Won	
Los 40 Music Awards	2008	Viva la Vida Tour	Best Tour	Nominated	
Los 40 Music Awards	2012	Mylo Xyloto	Best International Album	Nominated	
Los 40 Music Awards	2014	Coldplay	Best International Act	Nominated	
Los 40 Music Awards	2016	Coldplay	International Act of the Year	Nominated	
Los 40 Music Awards	2016	A Head Full of Dreams	International Album of the Year	Nominated	
Los 40 Music Awards	2016	A Head Full of Dreams Tour	Tour of the Year	Nominated	
Los 40 Music Awards	2016	"Up&Up"	International Video of the Year	Won	
Los 40 Music Awards	2017	"Something Just Like This" (w/ the Chainsmokers)	International Song of the Year	Nominated	
Los 40 Music Awards	2021	"Higher Power"	International Video of the Year	Nominated	
Los 40 Music Awards	2023	Coldplay	Best International Live Artist	Nominated	
Los 40 Music Awards	2024	Coldplay	Best International Live Artist	Won	
Los 40 Music Awards	2024	"Feelslikeimfallinginlove"	Best International Song	Nominated	
Los 40 Music Awards	2025	Coldplay	Best International Artist or Group	Nominated	
Los 40 Music Awards	2025	Moon Music	Best International Album	Nominated	
Lunas del Auditorio	2004	Coldplay	Best Foreign Rock	Won	
Lunas del Auditorio	2007	Coldplay	Best Foreign Rock	Won	
Lunas del Auditorio	2010	Coldplay	Best Foreign Rock	Nominated	
Lunas del Auditorio	2016	Coldplay	Best Foreign Pop	Won	
MAMA Awards	2021	"My Universe" (w/ BTS)	Song of the Year	Nominated	
MAMA Awards	2021	"My Universe" (w/ BTS)	Best Collaboration	Nominated	
Melon Music Awards	2017	"Something Just Like This" (w/ the Chainsmokers)	Best Pop	Nominated	
Melon Music Awards	2021	"My Universe" (w/ BTS)	Best Collaboration	Won	
Melon Weekly Popularity Awards	2021	"My Universe" (w/ BTS)	Number 1 Single – Week of 4 October	Won	
Melon Weekly Popularity Awards	2021	"My Universe" (w/ BTS)	Number 1 Single – Week of 11 October	Won	
Melon Weekly Popularity Awards	2021	"My Universe" (w/ BTS)	Number 1 Single – Week of 18 October	Won	
Melon Weekly Popularity Awards	2021	"My Universe" (w/ BTS)	Number 1 Single – Week of 29 November	Won	
Melon Weekly Popularity Awards	2021	"My Universe" (w/ BTS)	Number 1 Single – Week of 6 December	Won	
Mercury Prize	2000	Parachutes	Album of the Year	Nominated	
Mercury Prize	2003	A Rush of Blood to the Head	Album of the Year	Nominated	
Mercury Prize	2005	X&Y	Album of the Year	Nominated	
Meteor Music Awards	2003	Coldplay	Best International Group	Won	
Meteor Music Awards	2006	Coldplay	Best Live Performance	Nominated	
Meteor Music Awards	2006	X&Y	Best International Album	Nominated	
Meteor Music Awards	2009	Coldplay	Best International Band	Nominated	
Meteor Music Awards	2009	Coldplay	Best International Live Performance	Nominated	
Meteor Music Awards	2009	Viva la Vida or Death and All His Friends	Best International Album	Nominated	
Meteor Music Awards	2010	Coldplay	Best International Live Performance	Nominated	
Middle East Event Awards	2025	Music of the Spheres World Tour	Best Entertainment Production	Nominated	
Middle East Event Awards	2025	Music of the Spheres World Tour	Best Event Marketing Campaign of the Year	Won	
Middle East Event Awards	2025	Music of the Spheres World Tour	Best Music Event	Won	
Middle East Event Awards	2025	Music of the Spheres World Tour	Best Sustainability Initiative	Nominated	
MTV Africa Music Awards	2008	Coldplay	Best Alternative Act	Nominated	
MTV Africa Music Awards	2009	Coldplay	Best Alternative Act	Nominated	
MTV Asia Awards	2002	Coldplay	Favorite Breakthrough Artist	Nominated	
MTV Asia Awards	2002	Coldplay	Favorite Rock Act	Nominated	
MTV Asia Awards	2003	Coldplay	Favorite Rock Act	Nominated	
MTV Asia Awards	2003	"In My Place"	Favorite Video	Nominated	
MTV Asia Awards	2004	"The Scientist"	Favorite Video	Nominated	
MTV Asia Awards	2006	Coldplay	Favorite Rock Act	Nominated	
MTV Europe Music Awards	2002	Coldplay	Best Group	Nominated	
MTV Europe Music Awards	2002	Coldplay	Best Rock	Nominated	
MTV Europe Music Awards	2002	Coldplay	Best UK & Ireland Act	Won	
MTV Europe Music Awards	2002	A Rush of Blood to the Head	Best Album	Nominated	
MTV Europe Music Awards	2003	Coldplay	Best Group	Won	
MTV Europe Music Awards	2005	Coldplay	Best Group	Nominated	
MTV Europe Music Awards	2005	Coldplay	Best Rock	Nominated	
MTV Europe Music Awards	2005	Coldplay	Best UK & Ireland Act	Won	
MTV Europe Music Awards	2005	X&Y	Best Album	Nominated	
MTV Europe Music Awards	2005	"Speed of Sound"	Best Song	Won	
MTV Europe Music Awards	2008	Coldplay	Best Act	Nominated	
MTV Europe Music Awards	2008	Viva la Vida or Death and All His Friends	Best Album	Nominated	
MTV Europe Music Awards	2008	"Viva la Vida"	Most Addictive Track	Nominated	
MTV Europe Music Awards	2009	Coldplay	Best World Stage Performance	Nominated	
MTV Europe Music Awards	2011	Coldplay	Best Rock	Nominated	
MTV Europe Music Awards	2011	Coldplay	Best Live Act	Nominated	
MTV Europe Music Awards	2011	Coldplay	Best UK & Ireland Act	Nominated	
MTV Europe Music Awards	2012	Coldplay	Best Rock	Nominated	
MTV Europe Music Awards	2014	Coldplay	Best Rock	Nominated	
MTV Europe Music Awards	2015	Coldplay	Best Rock	Won	
MTV Europe Music Awards	2016	Coldplay	Best Rock	Won	
MTV Europe Music Awards	2016	Coldplay	Best Live Act	Nominated	
MTV Europe Music Awards	2016	Coldplay	Best UK & Ireland Act	Nominated	
MTV Europe Music Awards	2016	"Up&Up"	Best Video	Nominated	
MTV Europe Music Awards	2017	Coldplay	Best Rock	Won	
MTV Europe Music Awards	2017	Coldplay	Best Live Act	Nominated	
MTV Europe Music Awards	2020	Coldplay	Best Rock	Won	
MTV Europe Music Awards	2021	Coldplay	Best Rock	Nominated	
MTV Europe Music Awards	2022	Coldplay	Best Live Act	Nominated	
MTV Europe Music Awards	2024	Coldplay	Best Rock	Nominated	
MTV Europe Music Awards	2024	Coldplay	Best Live Act	Nominated	
MTV Italian Music Awards	2015	Coldplay	#MTVAwardsStar	Nominated	
MTV Italian Music Awards	2016	Coldplay	Best International Band	Nominated	
MTV Italian Music Awards	2016	Coldplay	#MTVAwardsStar	Nominated	
MTV Italian Music Awards	2017	Coldplay	Artist Saga Award	Nominated	
MTV Italian Music Awards	2017	"Up&Up"	Best Music Video	Nominated	
MTV Latin America Awards	2002	Coldplay	Best International Rock Artist	Nominated	
MTV Latin America Awards	2003	Coldplay	Best International Rock Artist	Won	
MTV Latin America Awards	2005	Coldplay	Best International Rock Artist	Nominated	
MTV Latin America Awards	2006	Coldplay	Best International Rock Artist	Nominated	
MTV Latin America Awards	2008	Coldplay	Best International Rock Artist	Nominated	
MTV Latin America Awards	2009	Coldplay	Best International Rock Artist	Nominated	
MTV Millennial Awards	2022	"My Universe" (w/ BTS)	Global Hit of the Year	Won	
MTV Millennial Awards Brazil	2022	"My Universe" (w/ BTS)	Global Hit of the Year	Won	
MTV Video Music Awards	2001	"Yellow"	Best New Artist in a Video	Nominated	
MTV Video Music Awards	2002	"Trouble"	Best Breakthrough Video	Nominated	
MTV Video Music Awards	2002	"Trouble"	Best Art Direction	Won	
MTV Video Music Awards	2003	"The Scientist"	Best Group Video	Won	
MTV Video Music Awards	2003	"The Scientist"	Best Breakthrough Video	Won	
MTV Video Music Awards	2003	"The Scientist"	Best Direction in a Video	Won	
MTV Video Music Awards	2005	"Speed of Sound"	Video of the Year	Nominated	
MTV Video Music Awards	2005	"Speed of Sound"	Best Special Effects	Nominated	
MTV Video Music Awards	2005	"Speed of Sound"	Best Editing	Nominated	
MTV Video Music Awards	2005	"Speed of Sound"	Best Cinematography	Nominated	
MTV Video Music Awards	2008	"Violet Hill"	Best Special Effects	Nominated	
MTV Video Music Awards	2008	"Violet Hill"	Best UK Video	Nominated	
MTV Video Music Awards	2009	"Viva la Vida"	Best Rock Video	Nominated	
MTV Video Music Awards	2009	"Viva la Vida"	Best Art Direction	Nominated	
MTV Video Music Awards	2009	"Viva la Vida"	Best Editing	Nominated	
MTV Video Music Awards	2009	"Viva la Vida"	Best Cinematography	Nominated	
MTV Video Music Awards	2010	"Strawberry Swing"	Best Breakthrough Video	Nominated	
MTV Video Music Awards	2012	"Paradise"	Best Rock Video	Won	
MTV Video Music Awards	2012	"Princess of China" (w/ Rihanna)	Best Direction	Nominated	
MTV Video Music Awards	2012	"Princess of China" (w/ Rihanna)	Best Cinematography	Nominated	
MTV Video Music Awards	2016	"Adventure of a Lifetime"	Best Rock Video	Nominated	
MTV Video Music Awards	2016	"Up&Up"	Best Direction	Nominated	
MTV Video Music Awards	2016	"Up&Up"	Best Visual Effects	Won	
MTV Video Music Awards	2017	"A Head Full of Dreams"	Best Rock Video	Nominated	
MTV Video Music Awards	2020	"Orphans"	Best Rock Video	Won	
MTV Video Music Awards	2021	"Higher Power"	Best Visual Effects	Nominated	
MTV Video Music Awards	2022	"My Universe" (w/ BTS)	Best Visual Effects	Nominated	
MTV Video Music Awards	2024	Coldplay	Best Group	Nominated	
MTV Video Music Awards	2024	"Feelslikeimfallinginlove"	Best Rock Video	Nominated	
MTV Video Music Awards	2024	"Feelslikeimfallinginlove"	Video for Good	Nominated	
MTV Video Music Awards	2025	Coldplay	Best Group	Nominated	
MTV Video Music Awards	2025	"All My Love"	Best Rock Video	Won	
MTV Video Music Awards Japan	2003	"In My Place"	Best Rock Video	Nominated	
MTV Video Music Awards Japan	2006	"Speed of Sound"	Best Rock Video	Nominated	
MTV Video Music Awards Japan	2009	Viva la Vida or Death and All His Friends	Best Album of the Year	Nominated	
MTV Video Music Awards Japan	2009	"Viva la Vida"	Best Video of the Year	Nominated	
MTV Video Music Awards Japan	2009	"Viva la Vida"	Best Karaokee! Song	Nominated	
MTV Video Music Awards Japan	2012	Mylo Xyloto	Best Album of the Year	Nominated	
MTV Video Music Awards Japan	2012	"Paradise"	Best Group Video	Nominated	
MTV Video Music Awards Japan	2016	"Up&Up"	Best Group Video – International	Nominated	
MTV Video Music Awards Japan	2016	"Up&Up"	Best Rock Video	Nominated	
MTV Video Music Awards Japan	2021	"My Universe" (w/ BTS)	Best Collaboration Video – International	Won	
MTV Video Play Awards	2011	"Every Teardrop Is a Waterfall"	Platinum Award	Won	
MTV Video Play Awards	2012	"Paradise"	Platinum Award	Won	
MTV Video Play Awards	2012	"Charlie Brown"	Platinum Award	Won	
MTV Video Play Awards	2012	"Princess of China" (w/ Rihanna)	Platinum Award	Won	
MTV Video Play Awards	2016	"Hymn for the Weekend"	Platinum Award	Won	
MTVU Woodie Awards	2004	Coldplay	Good Woodie	Nominated	
MTVU Woodie Awards	2005	Coldplay	Alumni Woodie	Nominated	
MTVU Woodie Awards	2005	Coldplay	Good Woodie	Nominated	
MuchMusic Video Awards	2001	"Yellow"	Best International Video – Group	Nominated	
MuchMusic Video Awards	2003	"In My Place"	Best International Video – Group	Nominated	
MuchMusic Video Awards	2006	"Speed of Sound"	Best International Video – Group	Nominated	
MuchMusic Video Awards	2009	"Viva la Vida"	Best International Video – Group	Nominated	
MuchMusic Video Awards	2012	"Paradise"	Best International Video – Group	Nominated	
MuchMusic Video Awards	2016	"Adventure of a Lifetime"	Best International Video – Group	Nominated	
Musa Awards	2021	"My Universe" (w/ BTS)	International Collaboration of the Year	Won	
Musa Awards	2022	Coldplay	International Anglo Artist of the Year	Won	
Music Awards Japan	2025	"Feelslikeimfallinginlove"	Best International Rock Song in Japan	Won	
Music Business Association	2006	Coldplay	Artist of the Year	Won	
Music Producers Guild Awards	2009	Viva la Vida or Death and All His Friends	UK Album of the Year	Nominated	
Music Week Awards	2009	Coldplay	Artist Marketing Campaign	Nominated	
Music Week Awards	2012	Coldplay	Artist Marketing Campaign	Nominated	
Music Week Awards	2016	Coldplay	Artist Marketing Campaign	Nominated	
Music Week Awards	2016	Coldplay	Artist of the Year	Won	
Music Week Awards	2020	Coldplay	Artist Marketing Campaign	Nominated	
Music Week Awards	2022	Coldplay	Artist Marketing Campaign	Nominated	
Music Week Awards	2023	Coldplay	Catalogue Marketing Campaign	Nominated	
Music Week Awards	2025	Moon Music (w/ FC Barcelona)	Music & Brand Partnership	Nominated	
Music Week Awards	2026	Coldplay	Catalogue Marketing Campaign	Nominated	
MusicTech Awards	2022	Coldplay	Changemaker Award	Won	
MVPA Awards	2001	"Yellow"	Best Direction of a New Artist	Won	
MVPA Awards	2006	"Fix You"	Best Adult Contemporary Video	Nominated	
MVPA Awards	2011	"Strawberry Swing"	Best Video of the Year	Nominated	
My VH1 Music Awards	2001	Coldplay	Best Kept Secret	Won	
My VH1 Music Awards	2001	Coldplay	Big in Japan	Won	
New Music Awards	2004	Coldplay	AC Group of the Year	Nominated	
New Music Awards	2008	Coldplay	AC Group of the Year	Won	
New Music Awards	2011	Coldplay	AC Group of the Year	Nominated	
New Music Awards	2015	Coldplay	AC Group of the Year	Nominated	
New Music Awards	2022	Coldplay	Top 40/CHR Group of the Year	Nominated	
New Music Awards	2022	Coldplay	AC Group of the Year	Nominated	
New Music Awards	2023	Coldplay	AC Group of the Year	Nominated	
New Music Awards	2025	Coldplay	Top 40/CHR Group of the Year	Nominated	
NME Awards	2000	Coldplay	Brightest Hope	Nominated	
NME Awards	2001	Coldplay	Best Band	Nominated	
NME Awards	2001	Coldplay	Best New Artist	Won	
NME Awards	2001	Parachutes	Best Album	Nominated	
NME Awards	2001	"Yellow"	Best Single	Won	
NME Awards	2001	BBC Radio 1's Evening Session	Session of the Year	Won	
NME Awards	2003	Coldplay	Artist of the Year	Nominated	
NME Awards	2003	Coldplay	Best UK Band	Nominated	
NME Awards	2003	Chris Martin	Hero of the Year	Nominated	
NME Awards	2003	Chris Martin	Most Sexy Man	Won	
NME Awards	2003	A Rush of Blood to the Head	Album of the Year	Won	
NME Awards	2003	A Rush of Blood to the Head	Best Album	Won	
NME Awards	2003	A Rush of Blood to the Head	Worst Album	Nominated	
NME Awards	2003	"The Scientist"	Best Single	Nominated	
NME Awards	2003	"The Scientist"	Best Video	Nominated	
NME Awards	2006	Coldplay	Worst Band	Nominated	
NME Awards	2006	Chris Martin	Worst Dressed	Nominated	
NME Awards	2009	Viva la Vida or Death and All His Friends	Worst Album	Nominated	
NME Awards	2012	Coldplay	Worst Band	Nominated	
NME Awards	2012	Mylo Xyloto	Worst Album	Nominated	
NME Awards	2016	Coldplay	Godlike Genius Award	Won	
NME Awards	2016	"Adventure of a Lifetime"	Best Track	Nominated	
NME Awards	2017	Coldplay	Best Festival Headliner	Nominated	
NME Awards	2017	Viola Beach Tribute	Music Moment of the Year	Won	
NME Awards	2022	"My Universe" (w/ BTS)	Best Collaboration	Nominated	
NMPA Songwriting Awards	2009	"Viva la Vida"	Multi-Platinum Award	Won	
NMPA Songwriting Awards	2011	"Paradise"	Multi-Platinum Award	Won	
NMPA Songwriting Awards	2016	"Adventure of a Lifetime"	Multi-Platinum Award	Won	
NMPA Songwriting Awards	2016	"Hymn for the Weekend"	Multi-Platinum Award	Won	
NMPA Songwriting Awards	2017	"Something Just Like This" (w/ the Chainsmokers)	Multi-Platinum Award	Won	
NMPA Songwriting Awards	2020	"A Sky Full of Stars"	Multi-Platinum Award	Won	
NMPA Songwriting Awards	2022	"My Universe" (w/ BTS)	Platinum Award	Won	
NMPA Songwriting Awards	2023	"Yellow"	Multi-Platinum Award	Won	
NMPA Songwriting Awards	2023	"The Scientist"	Multi-Platinum Award	Won	
NMPA Songwriting Awards	2023	"Clocks"	Multi-Platinum Award	Won	
NMPA Songwriting Awards	2023	"Fix You"	Multi-Platinum Award	Won	
Nordic Music Awards (Note: The Nordic Music Awards was held between 2004 and 2005 to honour excellence in Scandinavian music based on a public-voted process.)	2005	Coldplay	Best International Group	Won	
NRJ Music Awards	2006	Coldplay	International Group/Duo of the Year	Nominated	
NRJ Music Awards	2006	X&Y	International Album of the Year	Nominated	
NRJ Music Awards	2009	Coldplay	NRJ Award of Honor	Won	
NRJ Music Awards	2009	Coldplay	International Group/Duo of the Year	Nominated	
NRJ Music Awards	2009	Viva la Vida or Death and All His Friends	International Album of the Year	Nominated	
NRJ Music Awards	2009	"Viva la Vida"	International Song of the Year	Nominated	
NRJ Music Awards	2012	Coldplay	International Group/Duo of the Year	Nominated	
NRJ Music Awards	2013	Coldplay	International Group/Duo of the Year	Nominated	
NRJ Music Awards	2014	Coldplay	International Group/Duo of the Year	Nominated	
NRJ Music Awards	2014	"A Sky Full of Stars"	International Song of the Year	Nominated	
NRJ Music Awards	2016	Coldplay	International Group/Duo of the Year	Won	
NRJ Music Awards	2016	"Up&Up"	Video of the Year	Nominated	
NRJ Music Awards	2016	"Hymn for the Weekend"	Most Streamed Song	Won	
NRJ Music Awards	2017	"Something Just Like This" (w/ the Chainsmokers)	International Song of the Year	Nominated	
NRJ Music Awards	2017	"Something Just Like This" (w/ the Chainsmokers)	Video of the Year	Nominated	
NRJ Music Awards	2021	Coldplay	International Group/Duo of the Year	Won	
NRJ Music Awards	2021	"My Universe" (w/ BTS)	International Collaboration of the Year	Won	
NRJ Music Awards	2022	Coldplay	International Group/Duo of the Year	Nominated	
NRJ Music Awards	2022	"Let Somebody Go" (w/ Selena Gomez)	International Video of the Year	Nominated	
NRJ Music Awards	2024	Coldplay	International Group of the Year	Won	
NRJ Music Awards	2024	Coldplay	Concert of the Year	Nominated	
The Official Big Top 40 Awards	2011	"Paradise"	Number 1 Single	Won	
The Official Big Top 40 Awards	2017	"Something Just Like This" (w/ the Chainsmokers)	Number 1 Single	Won	
The Official Big Top 40 Awards	2021	"Higher Power"	Number 1 Single	Won	
The Official Big Top 40 Awards	2024	"Feelslikeimfallinginlove"	Number 1 Single	Won	
Official Charts Company	2000	Parachutes	Number 1 Album	Won	
Official Charts Company	2000	Parachutes	Specialist Award – Number 1 Scottish Album	Won	
Official Charts Company	2000	Parachutes	Specialist Award – Number 1 Physical Album	Won	
Official Charts Company	2000	Parachutes	Specialist Award – Number 1 Rock & Metal Album	Won	
Official Charts Company	2000	"Trouble"	Specialist Award – Number 1 Rock & Metal Single	Won	
Official Charts Company	2002	A Rush of Blood to the Head	Number 1 Album	Won	
Official Charts Company	2002	A Rush of Blood to the Head	Specialist Award – Number 1 Irish Album	Won	
Official Charts Company	2002	A Rush of Blood to the Head	Specialist Award – Number 1 Scottish Album	Won	
Official Charts Company	2002	A Rush of Blood to the Head	Specialist Award – Number 1 Physical Album	Won	
Official Charts Company	2005	"Speed of Sound"	Specialist Award – Number 1 Download Single	Won	
Official Charts Company	2005	X&Y	Number 1 Album	Won	
Official Charts Company	2005	X&Y	Specialist Award – Number 1 Irish Album	Won	
Official Charts Company	2005	X&Y	Specialist Award – Number 1 Scottish Album	Won	
Official Charts Company	2005	X&Y	Specialist Award – Number 1 Physical Album	Won	
Official Charts Company	2005	X&Y	Specialist Award – Number 1 Vinyl Album	Won	
Official Charts Company	2008	Viva la Vida or Death and All His Friends	Number 1 Album	Won	
Official Charts Company	2008	Viva la Vida or Death and All His Friends	Specialist Award – Number 1 Irish Album	Won	
Official Charts Company	2008	Viva la Vida or Death and All His Friends	Specialist Award – Number 1 Scottish Album	Won	
Official Charts Company	2008	Viva la Vida or Death and All His Friends	Specialist Award – Number 1 Download Album	Won	
Official Charts Company	2008	Viva la Vida or Death and All His Friends	Specialist Award – Number 1 Physical Album	Won	
Official Charts Company	2008	"Viva la Vida"	Number 1 Single	Won	
Official Charts Company	2008	"Viva la Vida"	Specialist Award – Number 1 Download Single	Won	
Official Charts Company	2011	Mylo Xyloto	Number 1 Album	Won	
Official Charts Company	2011	Mylo Xyloto	Specialist Award – Number 1 Irish Album	Won	
Official Charts Company	2011	Mylo Xyloto	Specialist Award – Number 1 Scottish Album	Won	
Official Charts Company	2011	Mylo Xyloto	Specialist Award – Number 1 Download Album	Won	
Official Charts Company	2011	Mylo Xyloto	Specialist Award – Number 1 Physical Album	Won	
Official Charts Company	2011	"Every Teardrop Is a Waterfall"	Specialist Award – Number 1 Physical Single	Won	
Official Charts Company	2012	Live 2012	Specialist Award – Number 1 Music Video	Won	
Official Charts Company	2012	"Paradise"	Number 1 Single	Won	
Official Charts Company	2012	"Paradise"	Specialist Award – Number 1 Scottish Single	Won	
Official Charts Company	2012	"Paradise"	Specialist Award – Number 1 Download Single	Won	
Official Charts Company	2014	Ghost Stories	Number 1 Album	Won	
Official Charts Company	2014	Ghost Stories	Specialist Award – Number 1 Irish Album	Won	
Official Charts Company	2014	Ghost Stories	Specialist Award – Number 1 Scottish Album	Won	
Official Charts Company	2014	Ghost Stories	Specialist Award – Number 1 Download Album	Won	
Official Charts Company	2014	Ghost Stories	Specialist Award – Number 1 Physical Album	Won	
Official Charts Company	2014	Ghost Stories	Specialist Award – Number 1 Record Store Album	Won	
Official Charts Company	2015	A Head Full of Dreams	Specialist Award – Number 1 Download Album	Won	
Official Charts Company	2015	A Head Full of Dreams	Specialist Award – Number 1 Vinyl Album	Won	
Official Charts Company	2015	"A Bridge over You" (Note: "A Bridge over You" was recorded by the Lewisham and Greenwich NHS Choir, with Coldplay receiving songwriting credits.)	Number 1 Single	Won	
Official Charts Company	2015	"A Bridge over You"	Specialist Award – Number 1 Scottish Single	Won	
Official Charts Company	2015	"A Bridge over You"	Specialist Award – Number 1 Download Single	Won	
Official Charts Company	2015	"A Bridge over You"	Specialist Award – Number 1 Independent Single	Won	
Official Charts Company	2016	Live 2012	Specialist Award – Number 1 Irish Music Video	Won	
Official Charts Company	2016	A Head Full of Dreams	Number 1 Album	Won	
Official Charts Company	2016	A Head Full of Dreams	Specialist Award – Number 1 Scottish Album	Won	
Official Charts Company	2016	A Head Full of Dreams	Specialist Award – Number 1 Sales Album	Won	
Official Charts Company	2017	"Something Just Like This" (w/ the Chainsmokers)	Specialist Award – Number 1 Dance Single	Won	
Official Charts Company	2019	Everyday Life	Number 1 Album	Won	
Official Charts Company	2019	Everyday Life	Specialist Award – Number 1 Scottish Album	Won	
Official Charts Company	2019	Everyday Life	Specialist Award – Number 1 Sales Album	Won	
Official Charts Company	2019	Everyday Life	Specialist Award – Number 1 Download Album	Won	
Official Charts Company	2019	Everyday Life	Specialist Award – Number 1 Physical Album	Won	
Official Charts Company	2019	Everyday Life	Specialist Award – Number 1 Vinyl Album	Won	
Official Charts Company	2020	"Christmas Lights"	Specialist Award – Number 1 Physical Single	Won	
Official Charts Company	2020	"Christmas Lights"	Specialist Award – Number 1 Vinyl Single	Won	
Official Charts Company	2021	"Higher Power"	Specialist Award – Number 1 Physical Single	Won	
Official Charts Company	2021	"My Universe" (w/ BTS)	Specialist Award – Number 1 Sales Single	Won	
Official Charts Company	2021	"My Universe" (w/ BTS)	Specialist Award – Number 1 Download Single	Won	
Official Charts Company	2021	"My Universe" (w/ BTS)	Specialist Award – Number 1 Physical Single	Won	
Official Charts Company	2021	Music of the Spheres	Number 1 Album	Won	
Official Charts Company	2021	Music of the Spheres	Specialist Award – Number 1 Irish Album	Won	
Official Charts Company	2021	Music of the Spheres	Specialist Award – Number 1 Scottish Album	Won	
Official Charts Company	2021	Music of the Spheres	Specialist Award – Number 1 Sales Album	Won	
Official Charts Company	2021	Music of the Spheres	Specialist Award – Number 1 Download Album	Won	
Official Charts Company	2021	Music of the Spheres	Specialist Award – Number 1 Physical Album	Won	
Official Charts Company	2021	Music of the Spheres	Specialist Award – Number 1 Vinyl Album	Won	
Official Charts Company	2024	"We Pray" (feat. Little Simz, Burna Boy, Elyanna and Tini)	Specialist Award – Number 1 Sales Single	Won	
Official Charts Company	2024	"We Pray" (feat. Little Simz, Burna Boy, Elyanna and Tini)	Specialist Award – Number 1 Download Single	Won	
Official Charts Company	2024	"We Pray" (feat. Little Simz, Burna Boy, Elyanna and Tini)	Specialist Award – Number 1 Physical Single	Won	
Official Charts Company	2024	Moon Music	Number 1 Album	Won	
Official Charts Company	2024	Moon Music	Specialist Award – Number 1 Irish Album	Won	
Official Charts Company	2024	Moon Music	Specialist Award – Number 1 Scottish Album	Won	
Official Charts Company	2024	Moon Music	Specialist Award – Number 1 Sales Album	Won	
Official Charts Company	2024	Moon Music	Specialist Award – Number 1 Download Album	Won	
Official Charts Company	2024	Moon Music	Specialist Award – Number 1 Physical Album	Won	
Official Charts Company	2024	Moon Music	Specialist Award – Number 1 Vinyl Album	Won	
Offizielle Deutsche Charts	2024	Moon Music	Number 1 Album	Won	
OGAE Contests	2009	"Viva la Vida"	Song Contest	Won	
OGAE Contests	2016	"Hymn for the Weekend"	Video Contest	Won	
The One Show	2012	Back to the Start	Branded Entertainment: Music – Best of Show	Won	
The One Show	2012	Back to the Start	Branded Entertainment: Music	Gold	
The One Show	2012	Coldplay: Unstaged	Branded Entertainment: Online/Long-Form	Merit	
The One Show	2017	"Up&Up"	Branded Entertainment: Music Videos	Silver	
The One Show	2017	"Up&Up"	Moving Image Craft: Visual Effects	Gold	
The One Show	2022	A Future Begins	Music & Sound Craft: Music Adaptation	Merit	
Online Film & Television Association	2009	"Fix You"	Best Adapted Song	Nominated	
Online Film & Television Association	2019	"Yellow"	Best Adapted Song	Nominated	
People's Choice Awards	2009	Coldplay	Favorite Band/Group	Nominated	
People's Choice Awards	2009	"Viva la Vida"	Favorite Rock Song	Nominated	
People's Choice Awards	2012	Coldplay	Favorite Band/Group	Nominated	
People's Choice Awards	2015	Coldplay	Favorite Band/Group	Nominated	
People's Choice Awards	2015	Ghost Stories	Favorite Album	Nominated	
People's Choice Awards	2017	Coldplay	Favorite Band/Group	Nominated	
People's Choice Awards	2021	Coldplay	The Group of 2021	Nominated	
People's Choice Awards	2021	"My Universe" (w/ BTS)	The Music Video of 2021	Nominated	
People's Choice Awards	2022	Coldplay	The Group of 2022	Nominated	
People's Choice Awards	2022	"Let Somebody Go" (w/ Selena Gomez)	The Music Video of 2022	Nominated	
People's Choice Awards	2024	Music of the Spheres World Tour	The Concert Tour of the Year	Nominated	
Phoenix Film Critics Society	2014	"Miracles"	Best Original Song	Nominated	
Planeta Awards	2021	"My Universe" (w/ BTS)	Best Collaboration	Won	
Pollstar Awards	2006	Twisted Logic Tour	Major Tour of the Year	Nominated	
Pollstar Awards	2009	Viva la Vida Tour	Major Tour of the Year	Nominated	
Pollstar Awards	2010	Viva la Vida Tour	Major Tour of the Year	Nominated	
Pollstar Awards	2013	Mylo Xyloto Tour	Major Tour of the Year	Nominated	
Pollstar Awards	2013	Mylo Xyloto Tour	Most Creative Stage Production	Nominated	
Pollstar Awards	2017	A Head Full of Dreams Tour	Major Tour of the Year	Nominated	
Pollstar Awards	2017	A Head Full of Dreams Tour	Most Creative Stage Production	Nominated	
Pollstar Awards	2018	A Head Full of Dreams Tour	Major Tour of the Year	Nominated	
Pollstar Awards	2018	A Head Full of Dreams Tour	Most Creative Stage Production	Nominated	
Pollstar Awards	2018	Xylobands	Tech Enhancement of the Year	Nominated	
Pollstar Awards	2021	Coldplay	Touring Artist of the Decade	Nominated	
Pollstar Awards	2021	Coldplay	Rock Touring Artist of the Decade	Nominated	
Pollstar Awards	2023	Music of the Spheres World Tour	Major Tour of the Year	Nominated	
Pollstar Awards	2023	Music of the Spheres World Tour	Rock Tour of the Year	Nominated	
Pollstar Awards	2023	Music of the Spheres World Tour	WhizBang Award	Won	
Pollstar Awards	2023	Music of the Spheres World Tour	Live Music Is Better Award	Nominated	
Pollstar Awards	2024	Music of the Spheres World Tour	Pop Tour of the Year	Nominated	
Pollstar Awards	2025	Music of the Spheres World Tour	Major Tour of the Year	Nominated	
Pollstar Awards	2025	Music of the Spheres World Tour	Rock Tour of the Year	Nominated	
Pollstar Awards	2026	Music of the Spheres World Tour	Pop Tour of the Year	Nominated	
Porin Awards	2009	Viva la Vida or Death and All His Friends	Best International Album	Nominated	
Porin Awards	2009	"Viva la Vida"	Best International Song	Won	
Porin Awards	2012	Mylo Xyloto	Best International Album	Nominated	
Porin Awards	2012	"Paradise"	Best International Song	Nominated	
Premios Odeón	2022	Coldplay	Internacional Odeón Artist	Nominated	
Premios Ondas	2005	Coldplay	Best International Artist or Group	Won	
Premios Ondas	2008	Coldplay	Best International Artist or Group	Won	
Premios Oye!	2003	A Rush of Blood to the Head	English Album of the Year	Won	
Premios Oye!	2003	Coldplay	English Group	Won	
Premios Oye!	2005	X&Y	English Album of the Year	Won	
Premios Oye!	2009	"Life in Technicolor II"	English Song of the Year	Nominated	
Premios Oye!	2009	Prospekt's March	English Album of the Year	Nominated	
Premios Oye!	2012	Every Teardrop is a Waterfall	English Album of the Year	Nominated	
Q Awards	2000	Coldplay	Best New Act	Nominated	
Q Awards	2000	Parachutes	Best Album	Won	
Q Awards	2000	"Yellow"	Best Single	Nominated	
Q Awards	2001	Coldplay	Best Act in the World Today	Nominated	
Q Awards	2002	Coldplay	Best Live Act	Nominated	
Q Awards	2002	A Rush of Blood to the Head	Best Album	Won	
Q Awards	2003	Coldplay	Best Act in the World Today	Nominated	
Q Awards	2003	Coldplay	Best Live Act	Nominated	
Q Awards	2003	"Clocks"	Best Single	Nominated	
Q Awards	2003	"The Scientist"	Best Video	Nominated	
Q Awards	2004	Coldplay	Best Act in the World Today	Nominated	
Q Awards	2005	Coldplay	Best Act in the World Today	Won	
Q Awards	2005	Coldplay	Best Live Act	Nominated	
Q Awards	2005	X&Y	Best Album	Nominated	
Q Awards	2005	"Fix You"	Best Track	Nominated	
Q Awards	2006	Coldplay	Best Act in the World Today	Nominated	
Q Awards	2008	Coldplay	Best Act in the World Today	Won	
Q Awards	2008	Viva la Vida or Death and All His Friends	Best Album	Won	
Q Awards	2008	"Violet Hill"	Best Track	Nominated	
Q Awards	2008	"Violet Hill"	Best Video	Nominated	
Q Awards	2009	Coldplay	Best Act in the World Today	Nominated	
Q Awards	2011	Coldplay	Best Act in the World Today	Won	
Q Awards	2011	Coldplay	Best Live Act	Nominated	
Q Awards	2011	Coldplay	Greatest Act of the Last 25 Years	Nominated	
Q Awards	2012	Coldplay	Best Act in the World Today	Nominated	
Q Awards	2014	"Magic"	Best Video	Nominated	
Q Awards	2016	Coldplay	Best Act in the World Today	Nominated	
Q Awards	2016	Coldplay	Best Live Act	Nominated	
Q Awards	2016	A Head Full of Dreams	Best Album	Nominated	
Q Awards	2016	"Up&Up"	Best Video	Nominated	
Qmusic Top 40 Awards	2023	Coldplay	Best International Live Act	Won	
Qmusic Top 40 Awards	2024	Coldplay	Best International Live Act	Won	
Radio Academy Honours	2006	Coldplay	Most Played Artist on British Radio	Won	
Rockbjörnen Awards	2002	Coldplay	Best International Group	Nominated	
Rockbjörnen Awards	2002	A Rush of Blood to the Head	Best International Album	Nominated	
Rockbjörnen Awards	2005	Coldplay	Best International Group	Nominated	
Rockbjörnen Awards	2005	X&Y	Best International Album	Nominated	
Rockbjörnen Awards	2005	"Fix You"	Best International Song	Nominated	
Rockbjörnen Awards	2008	Coldplay	Best International Group	Won	
Rockbjörnen Awards	2008	Viva la Vida or Death and All His Friends	Best International Album	Won	
Rockbjörnen Awards	2008	"Viva la Vida"	Best International Song	Won	
Rockbjörnen Awards	2021	"My Universe" (w/ BTS)	Foreign Song of the Year	Nominated	
Rockol Awards	2012	Mylo Xyloto	Best International Album	Silver	
Rockol Awards	2012	"Every Teardrop Is a Waterfall"	Best International Single	Bronze	
Rockol Awards	2012	"Paradise"	Best International Video	Gold	
Rockol Awards	2013	"Charlie Brown"	Best International Video	Nominated	
Rockol Awards	2017	A Head Full of Dreams	Best International Album – Critics Vote	Nominated	
Rockol Awards	2017	A Head Full of Dreams	Best International Album – Public Vote	Nominated	
Rockol Awards	2018	Coldplay	Best International Live Act – Public Vote	Nominated	
Rockol Awards	2020	Everyday Life	Best International Album – Public Vote	Nominated	
RTHK International Pop Poll Awards	2003	Coldplay	Top Group/Band	Nominated	
RTHK International Pop Poll Awards	2003	"In My Place"	Super Gold Song	Nominated	
RTHK International Pop Poll Awards	2004	Coldplay	Top Group/Band	Nominated	
RTHK International Pop Poll Awards	2006	Coldplay	Top Group/Band	Silver	
RTHK International Pop Poll Awards	2006	X&Y	Best-Selling Album	Won	
RTHK International Pop Poll Awards	2006	"Fix You"	Top 10 International Gold Songs	Won	
RTHK International Pop Poll Awards	2009	Coldplay	Top Group/Band	Gold	
RTHK International Pop Poll Awards	2009	"Viva la Vida"	Top 10 International Gold Songs	Won	
RTHK International Pop Poll Awards	2011	Coldplay	Top Group/Band	Nominated	
RTHK International Pop Poll Awards	2012	Coldplay	Top Group/Band	Silver	
RTHK International Pop Poll Awards	2015	Coldplay	Top Group/Band	Bronze	
RTHK International Pop Poll Awards	2015	"A Sky Full of Stars"	Top 10 International Gold Songs	Won	
RTHK International Pop Poll Awards	2017	Coldplay	Top Group/Band	Gold	
RTHK International Pop Poll Awards	2017	"Hymn for the Weekend"	Top 10 International Gold Songs	Won	
RTHK International Pop Poll Awards	2018	"Something Just Like This" (w/ the Chainsmokers)	Top 10 International Gold Songs	Won	
RTHK International Pop Poll Awards	2020	Coldplay	Top Group/Band	Bronze	
RTHK International Pop Poll Awards	2020	"Orphans"	Top 10 International Gold Songs	Nominated	
RTHK International Pop Poll Awards	2022	Coldplay	Top Group/Band	Gold	
RTHK International Pop Poll Awards	2022	"Higher Power"	Top 10 International Gold Songs	Nominated	
RTHK International Pop Poll Awards	2022	"My Universe" (w/ BTS)	Top 10 International Gold Songs	Nominated	
RTHK International Pop Poll Awards	2022	"Let Somebody Go" (w/ Selena Gomez)	Top 10 International Gold Songs	Nominated	
RTHK International Pop Poll Awards	2024	Coldplay	Top Group/Band	Gold	
RTHK International Pop Poll Awards	2024	"Feelslikeimfallinginlove"	Top 10 International Gold Songs	Won	
RTHK International Pop Poll Awards	2025	Coldplay	Top Group/Band	Gold	
RTHK International Pop Poll Awards	2025	"All My Love"	Top 10 International Gold Songs	Won	
RTS Programme Awards	2025	Glastonbury Festival 2024	Live Event	Nominated	
Shorty Awards	2025	Moon Music (w/ iHeartMedia)	Industry – Gaming	Honoree	
Shorty Awards	2025	Moon Music (w/ iHeartMedia)	Platforms & Technology – Interactive Content	Nominated	
Shorty Awards	2025	Moon Music (w/ Roblox)	Platforms & Technology – Immersive	Nominated	
Silver Clef Awards	2003	Coldplay	Silver Clef Award	Won	
Silver Clef Awards	2013	Coldplay	Best British Act	Won	
Silver Clef Awards	2013	Coldplay	Best Live Act	Nominated	
Silver Clef Awards	2017	Coldplay	Best Live Act	Nominated	
Sky Arts Awards	2003	A Rush of Blood to the Head	Pop Music	Nominated	
Space Shower Music Awards	2016	Coldplay	Best International Artist	Nominated	
Splash Awards	2023	Coldplay	Best International Duo or Group	Won	
Swiss Music Awards	2009	Viva la Vida or Death and All His Friends	Best Pop/Rock International Album	Nominated	
Swiss Music Awards	2012	Mylo Xyloto	Best Pop/Rock International Album	Nominated	
Swiss Music Awards	2015	Ghost Stories	Best International Album	Won	
Swiss Music Awards	2017	Coldplay	Best International Act	Won	
Swiss Music Awards	2017	A Head Full of Dreams	Best International Album	Won	
Swiss Music Awards	2018	"Something Just Like This" (w/ the Chainsmokers)	Best International Hit	Nominated	
Swiss Music Awards	2023	Coldplay	Best International Group	Nominated	
Swiss Music Awards	2025	Coldplay	Best International Group	Nominated	
TEC Awards	2009	Viva la Vida or Death and All His Friends	Record Production / Album	Won	
TEC Awards	2009	"Viva la Vida"	Record Production / Single or Track	Won	
TEC Awards	2013	Mylo Xyloto	Record Production / Album	Nominated	
TEC Awards	2013	"Paradise"	Record Production / Single or Track	Nominated	
TEC Awards	2015	Ghost Stories	Record Production / Album	Nominated	
TEC Awards	2015	"A Sky Full of Stars"	Record Production / Single or Track	Nominated	
TEC Awards	2017	A Head Full of Dreams	Record Production / Album	Nominated	
Teen Choice Awards	2003	Coldplay	Choice Music – Rock Group	Nominated	
Teen Choice Awards	2005	Coldplay	Choice Music – Rock Group	Nominated	
Teen Choice Awards	2012	"Paradise"	Choice Music – Rock Song	Won	
Teen Choice Awards	2012	Coldplay	Choice Music – Summer Group	Nominated	
Teen Choice Awards	2014	Coldplay	Choice Music – Rock Group	Nominated	
Teen Choice Awards	2017	Coldplay	Choice Music – Summer Group	Nominated	
Teen Choice Awards	2017	"Something Just Like This" (w/ the Chainsmokers)	Choice Music – Electronic Song	Nominated	
Telehit Awards	2016	"Up&Up"	Video of the Year	Won	
Ticketmaster Awards	2016	A Head Full of Dreams Tour	Ticket of the Year – Global	Won	
Ticketmaster Awards	2016	A Head Full of Dreams Tour	Ticket of the Year – United Kingdom	Won	
Ticketmaster Awards	2016	A Head Full of Dreams Tour	Ticket of the Year – Spain	Won	
Ticketmaster Awards	2016	A Head Full of Dreams Tour	Most Anticipated Event of 2017 – France	Won	
Ticketmaster Awards	2017	A Head Full of Dreams Tour	Ticket of the Year – Global	Won	
Ticketmaster Awards	2017	A Head Full of Dreams Tour	Ticket of the Year – Canada	Won	
Ticketmaster Awards	2017	A Head Full of Dreams Tour	Ticket of the Year – France	Won	
Ticketmaster Awards	2017	A Head Full of Dreams Tour	Best Live Event of the Past 20 Years – Ireland	Won	
Ticketmaster Awards	2017	A Head Full of Dreams Tour	Ticket of the Year – Ireland	Won	
Ticketmaster Awards	2017	A Head Full of Dreams Tour	Ticket of the Year – Poland	Won	
Ticketmaster Awards	2017	A Head Full of Dreams Tour	Ticket of the Year – Sweden	Won	
Ticketmaster Awards	2023	Coldplay	British Live Act of the Year – United Kingdom	Won	
Ticketmaster Awards	2023	Coldplay	Live Act of the Year – Germany	Nominated	
Ticketmaster Awards	2023	Coldplay	Best Big Act – Belgium	Won	
Ticketmaster Awards	2023	Music of the Spheres World Tour	Concert of the Year – Poland	Nominated	
Ticketmaster Awards	2023	Music of the Spheres World Tour	Best International Concert – France	Won	
Ticketmaster Awards	2023	Music of the Spheres World Tour	Most Anticipated Event of 2023 – Italy	Won	
Ticketmaster Awards	2024	Coldplay	Best Live Band – Spain	Won	
Ticketmaster Awards	2024	Coldplay	Live Artist/Band of the Year – Australia	Nominated	
Ticketmaster Awards	2024	Music of the Spheres World Tour	Concert of the Year – Sweden	Won	
Ticketmaster Awards	2024	Music of the Spheres World Tour	Concert of the Year – Switzerland	Won	
Ticketmaster Awards	2024	Music of the Spheres World Tour	Most Anticipated Event of 2024 – Australia	Nominated	
Ticketmaster Awards	2024	Music of the Spheres World Tour	Most Anticipated Event of 2024 – France	Won	
Ticketmaster Awards	2024	Music of the Spheres World Tour	Most Anticipated Event of 2024 – Germany	Won	
Ticketmaster Awards	2024	Music of the Spheres World Tour	Most Anticipated Event of 2024 – Italy	Won	
Ticketmaster Awards	2024	Music of the Spheres World Tour	Most Anticipated Event of 2024 – New Zealand	Won	
Ticketmaster Awards	2025	Coldplay	International Act of the Year – Germany	Nominated	
Ticketmaster Awards	2025	Coldplay	International Act of the Year – Ireland	Won	
Ticketmaster Awards	2025	Coldplay	Best International Artist – Italy	Won	
Ticketmaster Awards	2025	Music of the Spheres World Tour	Event of the Year – Austria	Won	
Ticketmaster Awards	2025	Music of the Spheres World Tour	Music Event of the Year – Greece	Won	
Ticketmaster Awards	2025	Music of the Spheres World Tour	International Concert of the Year – France	Won	
TMF Awards	2008	Viva la Vida or Death and All His Friends	Best International Album	Won	
Tokio Hot 100 Awards	2006	Coldplay	Best Group	Nominated	
Tokio Hot 100 Awards	2009	Coldplay	Best Group	Nominated	
Tokio Hot 100 Awards	2009	"Viva la Vida"	Best Song	Won	
Tokio Hot 100 Awards	2024	Coldplay	Best Performance – Overseas	Nominated	
Top of the Pops Awards	2002	A Rush of Blood to the Head	Top Album	Won	
TPi Awards (Note: The TPi Awards was established in 2002 to honour excellence in global live entertainment based on a public-voted selection process.)	2017	A Head Full of Dreams Tour	Live Production of the Year	Won	
TPi Awards	2023	Music of the Spheres World Tour	Live Production of the Year	Nominated	
TPiMEA Awards (Note: The TPiMEA Awards was established in 2018 to honour excellence in Middle Eastern and African live entertainment based on a public-voted selection process.)	2025	Music of the Spheres World Tour	Outstanding Event Production of the Year	Won	
UK Festival Awards	2005	"Fix You"	Anthem of the Summer	Nominated	
UK Music Video Awards	2009	"Strawberry Swing"	Video of the Year	Won	
UK Music Video Awards	2009	"Strawberry Swing"	Best Animation in a Video	Won	
UK Music Video Awards	2009	"Strawberry Swing"	Best Rock Video	Won	
UK Music Video Awards	2009	"Life in Technicolor II"	Best Rock Video	Nominated	
UK Music Video Awards	2009	"Life in Technicolor II"	Best Art Direction in a Video	Nominated	
UK Music Video Awards	2009	"Life in Technicolor II"	Best Visual Effects in a Video	Nominated	
UK Music Video Awards	2012	"Paradise" (Shynola Version)	Best Rock/Indie Video	Nominated	
UK Music Video Awards	2014	"Magic"	Best Styling in a Video	Nominated	
UK Music Video Awards	2014	"Always in My Head"	Best Animation in a Video	Nominated	
UK Music Video Awards	2014	Coldplay: Ghost Stories	Best Live Coverage	Nominated	
UK Music Video Awards	2015	"Ink"	Best Interactive Video	Nominated	
UK Music Video Awards	2016	"Up&Up"	Best Rock/Indie Video	Won	
UK Music Video Awards	2016	"Up&Up"	Best Visual Effects in a Video	Nominated	
UK Music Video Awards	2017	"Everglow"	Best Rock/Indie Video	Nominated	
UK Music Video Awards	2019	Live in São Paulo	Best Live Concert	Nominated	
UK Music Video Awards	2020	"Trouble in Town"	Best Rock Video	Nominated	
UK Music Video Awards	2020	"Daddy"	Best Animation in a Video	Nominated	
UK Music Video Awards	2024	"Feelslikeimfallinginlove"	Best Pop Video	Nominated	
UK Music Video Awards	2024	"Feelslikeimfallinginlove"	Best Animation in a Video	Won	
Vodafone Live Music Awards	2006	Coldplay	Best Live Act	Nominated	
WDM Radio Awards	2018	"Something Just Like This" (w/ the Chainsmokers)	Best Global Track	Nominated	
WDM Radio Awards	2018	"Something Just Like This" (Don Diablo remix)	Best Remix	Won	
Webby Awards	2009	Coldplay	Websites and Mobile Sites – Celebrity/Fan	Honoree	
Webby Awards	2011	Coldplay	Websites and Mobile Sites – Music	Honoree	
Webby Awards	2012	Coldplay: Unstaged	Video & Film – Events & Live Streams	Nominated	
Webby Awards	2015	"Ink"	Online Film & Video – Music	Won	
Webby Awards	2015	"Ink"	Online Film & Video – Best Interactive	Won	
Webby Awards	2015	"Ink"	Online Film & Video – Animation	Won	
Webby Awards	2015	Coldplay Lyrics Hunt	Social – Promotions & Contests	Won	
Webby Awards	2017	"Up&Up"	Video & Film – Music Video	Won	
Webby Awards	2019	Coldplay Timeline	Websites and Mobile Sites – Music	Won	
Webby Awards	2020	"Daddy"	Video & Film – Animation	Honoree	
Webby Awards	2022	A Future Begins	Video & Film – Music (Branded)	Nominated	
World Music Awards	2005	Coldplay	World's Best-Selling British Artist	Won	
World Music Awards	2006	Coldplay	World's Best-Selling Rock Group	Nominated	
World Music Awards	2008	Coldplay	World's Best-Selling Recording Act	Won	
World Music Awards	2008	Coldplay	World's Best-Selling Rock Group	Won	
World Music Awards	2008	Coldplay	World's Best-Selling British Artist	Won	
World Music Awards	2012	Coldplay	World's Best-Selling Group	Nominated	
YouTube Creator Awards	2011	Coldplay	Silver Creator Award	Won	
YouTube Creator Awards	2014	Coldplay	Gold Creator Award	Won	
YouTube Creator Awards	2017	Coldplay	Diamond Creator Award	Won	
ZD Awards	2015	Coldplay	Best Foreign Artist	Nominated	
Žebřík Music Awards	2003	Coldplay	Best Foreign Group	2nd place	
Žebřík Music Awards	2003	Coldplay	Best Foreign Surprise	2nd place	
Žebřík Music Awards	2003	Chris Martin	Best Foreign Singer	3rd place	
Žebřík Music Awards	2003	Chris Martin	Best Foreign Personality	Nominated	
Žebřík Music Awards	2003	A Rush of Blood to the Head	Best Foreign Album	2nd place	
Žebřík Music Awards	2003	"In My Place"	Best Foreign Composition	2nd place	
Žebřík Music Awards	2003	"The Scientist"	Best Foreign Composition	Nominated	
Žebřík Music Awards	2003	"The Scientist"	Best Foreign Video	2nd place	
Žebřík Music Awards	2004	Coldplay	Best Foreign Group	2nd place	
Žebřík Music Awards	2004	Chris Martin	Best Foreign Singer	Nominated	
Žebřík Music Awards	2004	Chris Martin	Best Foreign Personality	Nominated	
Žebřík Music Awards	2004	"Clocks"	Best Foreign Composition	Nominated	
Žebřík Music Awards	2005	Chris Martin	Best Foreign Singer	Nominated	
Žebřík Music Awards	2006	Coldplay	Best Foreign Group	Nominated	
Žebřík Music Awards	2006	Coldplay	Best Foreign Surprise	Nominated	
Žebřík Music Awards	2006	Chris Martin	Best Foreign Singer	Nominated	
Žebřík Music Awards	2006	Chris Martin	Best Foreign Personality	Nominated	
Žebřík Music Awards	2006	X&Y	Best Foreign Album	1st place	
Žebřík Music Awards	2006	"Speed of Sound"	Best Foreign Composition	Nominated	
Žebřík Music Awards	2006	"Fix You"	Best Foreign Composition	Nominated	
Žebřík Music Awards	2006	"Fix You"	Best Foreign Video	Nominated	
Žebřík Music Awards	2009	Coldplay	Best Foreign Group	1st place	
Žebřík Music Awards	2009	Chris Martin	Best Foreign Singer	2nd place	
Žebřík Music Awards	2009	Viva la Vida or Death and All His Friends	Best Foreign Album	1st place	
Žebřík Music Awards	2009	"Viva la Vida"	Best Foreign Composition	1st place	
Žebřík Music Awards	2009	"Viva la Vida"	Best Foreign Video	1st place	
Žebřík Music Awards	2009	"Violet Hill"	Best Foreign Video	Nominated	
Žebřík Music Awards	2012	Coldplay	Best Foreign Group	1st place	
Žebřík Music Awards	2012	Chris Martin	Best Foreign Singer	3rd place	
Žebřík Music Awards	2012	Mylo Xyloto	Best Foreign Album	3rd place	
Žebřík Music Awards	2012	"Paradise"	Best Foreign Composition	3rd place	
Žebřík Music Awards	2012	"Paradise"	Best Foreign Video	1st place	
Žebřík Music Awards	2013	Coldplay	Best Foreign Group	1st place	
Žebřík Music Awards	2013	Coldplay	Best Foreign Live Act	1st place	
Žebřík Music Awards	2014	Coldplay	Best Foreign Group	Nominated	
Žebřík Music Awards	2015	Coldplay	Best Foreign Group	3rd place	
Žebřík Music Awards	2015	"A Sky Full of Stars"	Best Foreign Video	2nd place	
Žebřík Music Awards	2016	Coldplay	Best Foreign Group	1st place	
Žebřík Music Awards	2016	A Head Full of Dreams	Best Foreign Album	Nominated	
Žebřík Music Awards	2016	"Adventure of a Lifetime"	Best Foreign Video	Nominated	
Žebřík Music Awards	2017	Coldplay	Best Foreign Group	2nd place	
Žebřík Music Awards	2017	"Up&Up"	Best Foreign Video	2nd place	
Žebřík Music Awards	2018	Coldplay	Best Foreign Group	Nominated	
Žebřík Music Awards	2021	Coldplay	Best Foreign Group	3rd place	
Žebřík Music Awards	2022	Coldplay	Best Foreign Group	2nd place	
Žebřík Music Awards	2022	Chris Martin	Best Foreign Singer	2nd place	
Žebřík Music Awards	2022	Music of the Spheres	Best Foreign Album	Nominated	
Žebřík Music Awards	2022	"Higher Power"	Best Foreign Video	1st place	
Žebřík Music Awards	2023	Coldplay	Best Foreign Group	Nominated	
Žebřík Music Awards	2023	Chris Martin	Best Foreign Singer	Nominated	
Žebřík Music Awards	2024	Chris Martin	Best Foreign Singer	Nominated	

== Other accolades ==
=== Cultural honours ===
List of cultural honours
Country	Year	Description	Ref.
Brazil	2022	Pedro Ernesto Medal (Nominated)	
England	2005	National Portrait Gallery Seat	
England	2010	Royal Mail Commemorative Stamp	
England	2014	Freedom of the City of Exeter (Nominated) (Note: Martin was considered for his work with the band.)	
India	2025	Earth Day Ambassador Award	
Poland	2022	World Bicycle Day Special Award	
United States	2025	Resolution of Honour from the Government of Tennessee	
United States	2025	Key to the City of El Paso	
United States	2025	13–14 June, El Paso (Coldplay Days)	

=== World records ===
Key
†	Indicates a former world record

List of entries on Guinness World Records
Year	Recipient	Description	Ref.
2008	Coldplay	First Act to Sell Over a Million Digital Albums in the US	
2008	Viva la Vida or Death and All His Friends	Fastest-Selling Digital Album in the UK †	
2008	Viva la Vida or Death and All His Friends	Best-Selling Digital Album in the UK †	
2008	"Violet Hill"	Most Downloaded Free Track in a Week	
2011	Mylo Xyloto	Fastest-Selling Digital Album in the UK †	
2014	Coldplay	Most Streamed Act on Spotify (Duo or Group) †	
2016	Coldplay	Most Brit Awards Won by a Group	
2018	Coldplay	Highest Annual Earnings for a Group (Current Year)	
2020	Coldplay	Most Tracked Group on Songkick	
2021	"My Universe" (w/ BTS)	Highest Debut by a UK Group in the US Singles Chart (Note: Coldplay debuted at number one while the record belonged to One Direction's "Live While We're Young" (2012) at number three.)	
2023	"One World"	Most Fan Voices to Feature on a Music Single	
2023	Music of the Spheres World Tour	Highest-Grossing Music Tour by a Group (Current Year) †	
2024	Coldplay	Most Monthly Listeners on Spotify (Duo or Group)	
2024	Music of the Spheres World Tour	Highest Attendance for a Music Tour	
2024	Music of the Spheres World Tour	Highest-Grossing Music Tour by a Group (Note: Coldplay grossed $1.52 billion while the record belonged to U2's 360° Tour (2009–2011) at $736.4 million.)	
2025	Music of the Spheres World Tour	Longest Residency by a Musician at Wembley Stadium (Single Run) †	

=== Rankings and listicles ===
List of rankings and listicles
Publication	Year	Description	Result	Ref.
American Songwriter	2024	The Best Male Vocalists of the 21st Century	Placed	
American Songwriter	2024	4 of the Best Post-Britpop Bands of All Time	Placed	
Billboard	2009	Top Artists of the 2000s	53	
Billboard	2021	Top Artists of the 2010s	43	
Billboard	2025	Top Artists of the 21st Century	53	
Billboard	2025	UK Power Players (under "Management") (Note: Harvey, Mandi Frost and Arlene Moon were considered for their work with the band.)	Placed	
Billboard	2026	UK Power Players (under "Management")	Placed	
Billboard Argentina	2016	Best International Bands of the Year	1	
Business Insider	2019	35 Musicians You Should See Live at Least Once in Your Life	Placed	
Classical Music	2025	The 17 Most Polarising Rock Bands	3	
Cleveland	2020	The Best Rock Band in the World, Every Year Since 1969	Placed	
Cosmopolitan India	2023	7 Artists You Should See Live at Least Once in Your Life	Placed	
Debrett's	2017	Debrett's 500 List (under "Music")	Placed	
Entertainment Weekly	2008	Entertainers of the Year	11	
Entertainment Weekly	2009	17 Brilliant British Invaders	5	
Entertainment Weekly	2012	30 Greatest Music Artists Right Now	22	
Evening Standard	2012	Most Influential People (under "Music Makers")	Placed	
Evening Standard	2025	The 20 Greatest British Rock Bands of All Time	10	
Forbes	2009	Celebrity 100	15	
Forbes	2009	The Highest-Paid Musicians of 2009	4	
Forbes	2010	Celebrity 100	35	
Forbes	2010	The Highest-Paid Musicians of 2010	10	
Forbes	2012	The Highest-Paid Musicians of 2012	21	
Forbes	2013	Celebrity 100	14	
Forbes	2013	The Highest-Paid Musicians of 2013	5	
Forbes	2017	Celebrity 100	8	
Forbes	2017	The Highest-Paid Musicians of 2017	5	
Forbes	2018	Celebrity 100	7	
Forbes	2018	The Highest-Paid Musicians of 2018	2	
Forbes	2025	35 Top Bands and Musical Artists of the 2000s	5	
Forbes	2025	The Highest-Paid Musicians of 2025	5	
The Guardian	2003	The 40 Best Bands in Britain	18	
The Guardian	2022	The 100 Greatest BBC Music Performances	87	
The Guardian	2023	Best Glastonbury Headline Sets Ever	10	
The Independent	2004	The Music Industry's 100 Most Influential People	10	
The Independent	2016	Glastonbury's Best Headline Performances of the Past 20 Years	Placed	
IQ	2024	Green Guardians	Placed	
IQ	2025	Green Guardians	Placed	
MusicRadar	2009	200 Things We Loved About 2009 (Note: Champion was considered for his work with the band.)	177	
MusicRadar	2016	The 10 Must-See Drummers of Glastonbury 2016	2	
MusicRadar	2016	The 14 Best British Rock Drummers in the World Right Now	1	
MusicRadar	2022	The Best Pop, R&B and Funk Guitarists of 2022 (Note: Buckland was considered for his work with the band.)	4	
NME	1999	20 New Bands for '99	Placed	
NPR	2020	The Best Tiny Desk Concerts of 2020	Placed	
Parade	2021	100 Best Rock Bands of All Time	44	
Q	2004	100 Greatest Gigs Ever	4	
Q	2004	100 Greatest Gigs Ever	39	
Q	2010	Artists of the Century	Placed	
Radio X	2019	The Best Bands of All Time	Placed	
Radio X	2025	The 10 Greatest Glastonbury Headliners of All Time	3	
Rolling Stone	2003	People of the Year	Placed	
Rolling Stone	2009	Top Artists of the 2000s	4	
Select	2001	Band of the Year	1	
Spin	2003	Band of the Year	1	
Spin	2021	Our 21 Favorite Concerts of 2021	Placed	
The Telegraph	2008	50 Best British Songwriters	25	
The Telegraph	2022	Glastonbury Headliners Ranked from Worst to Best	5	
The Telegraph	2023	The 50 Best Glastonbury Festival Performances Ever	18	
Time	2023	100 Climate (under "Catalysts")	Placed	
The Times	2016	Britain's 500 Most Influential	Placed	
The Times	2017	Best Live Bands of 2017	Placed	
Triple M	2023	The Greatest Singers of All Time	93	
TVLine	2026	10 Best Episodes of Saturday Night Live	8	
Uproxx	2022	The Best Lead Singers, Ranked	68	
VH1	2010	100 Greatest Music Artists of All Time	67	
Vice	2026	3 Bands Who Pioneered 2000s Post-Britpop	Placed	
Vulture	2024	Coachellas, Ranked	7	
The West Australian	2023	West Australian People of the Year	21	
Yardbarker	2023	The Best Coachella Headliners Ever	6	
Yardbarker	2023	30 of the Most Memorable NPR Tiny Desk Concerts	Placed	

=== Honorary degrees ===
List of honorary degrees
School	Year	Recipient	Degree	Ref.
University of Southampton	2023	Will Champion	Doctorate of Music (D.M.)	
