= Trouble in Town (song) =

2019 song by Coldplay

Song by Coldplay

from the album Everyday Life
- Language: English; Xhosa
- Released: 22 November 2019
- Genre: Art rock; alternative rock
- Length: 4:38
- Label: Parlophone; Atlantic
- Songwriters: Guy Berryman; Jonny Buckland; Will Champion; Chris Martin
- Producers: Rik Simpson; Dan Green; Bill Rahko

Music video
- "Trouble in Town" on YouTube

"Trouble in Town" is a song by British rock band Coldplay, released on their eighth studio album, Everyday Life (2019). The track is widely noted as one of the album's most politically charged pieces, addressing U.S. racial injustice and police brutality.

== Production and composition ==
The song incorporates a real 2013 cellphone recording of Philadelphia police officers harassing black men in its second half, prompting a dramatic tonal shift as the piano line plunges and the arrangement swells. The song closes with a Sowetan children's choir chanting in Xhosa, "U Mandela Siyamthanda futhi uyaziwa yonk' indawo jikelele" ("We love Mandela and he is well known all over the world"), and repeating the word "Jikelele" ("all around the world").

== Release and reception ==
Coldplay pledged all masters and publishing royalties from "Trouble in Town" to the Innocence Project, for which frontman Chris Martin is an "Innocence Ambassador", with additional proceeds benefiting the African Children's Feeding Scheme. Critics praised the song's somber mood and urgent social commentary, though some raised concerns about potential "white savior" undertones in its presentation of trauma.

== Music video ==
A music video, released on 12 March 2020, reimagines George Orwell's Animal Farm in a modern, crime-ridden New York City. The video depicts pig politicians brawling on a debate stage, a fox pursued by a snow-leopard police officer, a cat stealing a bodega drink, and a homeless deer reading Orwell's novella. The video's release followed earlier Everyday Life visuals for "Champion of the World", "Cry Cry Cry", "Daddy", "Orphans", and the album's title track.
