= Žebřík Music Awards =

Czech awards show

- Description: honouring excellence in music achievements for Czech musicians
- Country: Czech Republic
- First award: 1993, 29 years ago
- Website: https://www.anketazebrik.cz

The Žebřík Music Awards (also known as Music Ladder Awards) is a Czech awards show organized by music and style magazine iReport to honor the best artists in Czech Republic and internationally. It was first held in 1993 to announce the winners of their 1992 poll, following the same pattern ever since. The ceremony is usually held every year at Plzeň's DEPO2015, except in 2020 due to the COVID-19 pandemic, which led winners from both 2019 and 2020 polls to be reported in 2021.

== Categories ==
The Žebřík Music Awards are divided into two parts: home stage (domestic) and international (foreign). Winners and nominees for each category are decided by the public through SMS or by filling a voting form in the iReport website. The first round goes from January 1 to 31 and results in five nominees in ten categories, while the second round takes place from February 1 to 28 and determines the final ranking in each category.

Current Awards Categories
Home Stage	International
Group of the Year	Group of the Year
Album of the Year	Album of the Year
Composition or Song of the Year	Composition of the Year
Video Clip of the Year	Video Clip of the Year
Male Singer of the Year	Male Singer of the Year
Female Singer of the Year	Female Singer of the Year
Discovery of the Year	Discovery of the Year
Action of the Year	Action of the Year
Movie of the Year	Movie of the Year
Prize Memoriam	Prize Memoriam
* Special Prize	* Special Prize
