= Daddy (Coldplay song) =

2019 song by Coldplay

Song by Coldplay

from the album Everyday Life
- Released: 20 November 2019
- Genre: Soft rock; ambient
- Length: 4:58
- Label: Parlophone; Atlantic
- Songwriters: Guy Berryman; Jonny Buckland; Will Champion; Chris Martin
- Producers: Rik Simpson; Dan Green; Bill Rahko

Music video
- "Daddy" on YouTube

"Daddy" is a song by British rock band Coldplay from their eighth studio album Everyday Life. It was written by the band members and produced by The Dream Team, being released on 20 November 2019 along with "Champion of the World" in anticipation for the album's release. The track appears on the Sunrise side of the record.

An animated music video for the song directed by Åsa Lucander from Aardman Animations was also released. A female protagonist is shown in a small rowing boat in the middle of the ocean as she tries to go into the unknown. To further promote the song, the band performed it live in Jordan and BBC Radio 1 in London. "Daddy" managed to appear on the New Zealand Hot Singles chart at a position of 38 and on the US Hot Rock & Alternative Songs at number 17.

== Music video ==
The music video for "Daddy" was animated by Aardman Animations and directed by Åsa Lucander. It was premiered on 20 November 2019 and features live action puppetry, digitally painted sets and 2D animation. The plot sees a girl who is lost at sea, alone in a rowing boat and sailing towards the unknown, symbolising the memories she has of her father. Gil Kaufman from Billboard described the video as "mind-bending". Creative Review listed it among its honorable mentions for the 2020 Annual Awards.

== Live performances ==
Coldplay first performed the song live on the release day of the album, on 22 November 2019, as part of a concert they gave at the Amman Citadel in Jordan. The video was released as a YouTube original on their channel on 8 January 2020 showing aerial views of the city in addition to the band performing. On 28 November 2019, the band appeared at BBC Radio 1's Maida Vale Studios and performed "Daddy".

== Personnel ==
- Chris Martin – vocals, piano
- Jonny Buckland – acoustic guitar, keyboard
- Guy Berryman – bass guitar
- Will Champion – percussion, keyboard

== Charts ==
Weekly chart performance
Chart (2019)	Peak position
New Zealand Hot Singles (RMNZ)	38
South Korea BGM (Gaon)	148
US Hot Rock & Alternative Songs (Billboard)	17
