= Geography Now =

American educational YouTube channel

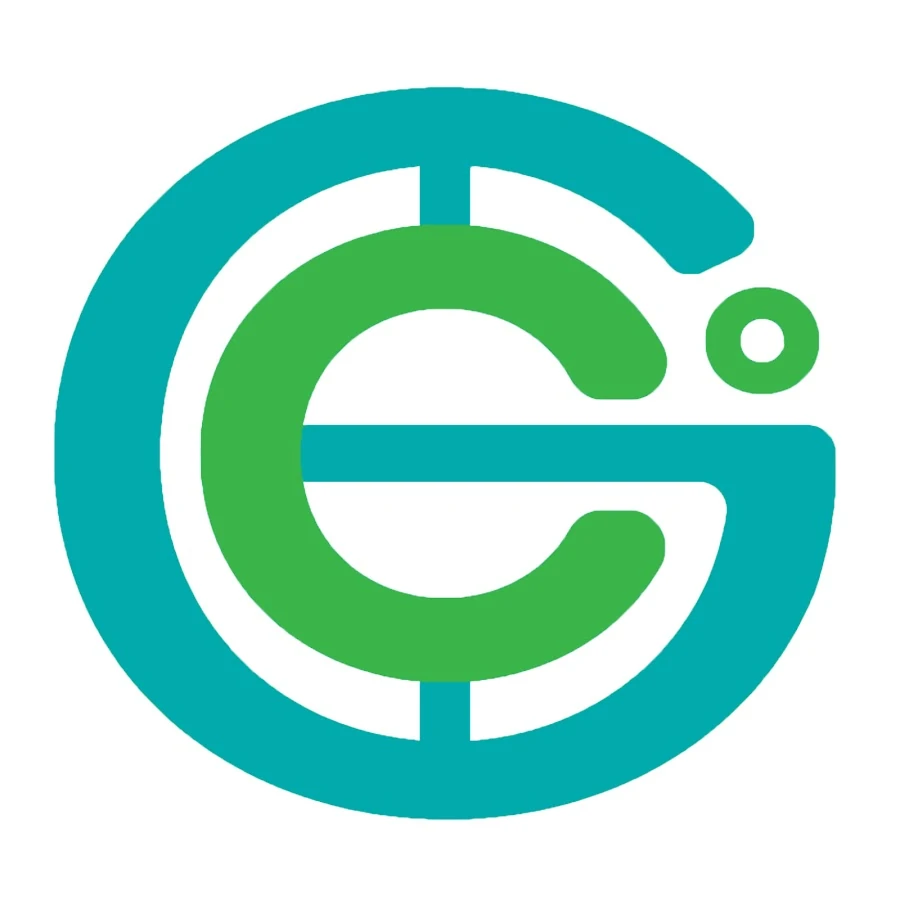
- The logo for Geography Now

YouTube information
- Channel: Geography Now
- Years active: 2014–present
- Genre: Education
- Subscribers: 3.92 million
- Views: 729.4 million
- Last updated: August 10, 2026
- Website: www.geographynow.com

Geography Now (also stylized as Geography Now!) is an American educational YouTube channel and web series created and hosted by Paul "Barbs" Barbato. He profiled UN-recognized countries in the world in alphabetical order, a series which finished in October 2024. He now covers additional topics related to physical geography, political geography and cities. The channel started uploading in October 2014, and as of August 2026, he has accumulated 3.93 million subscribers, created 1,306 videos, and gained over 745 million views.

== Team ==
=== Main hosts, co-hosts, and crews ===
- Paul Barbato, sometimes nicknamed Barby or Barbs – creator and host.
  - Barbato was born on June 7, 1987, in Minnesota to Korean immigrant parents. His father was born in Gyeonggi-do and his mother was born in Daegu. Barbato describes his parents as Hapas - half Korean and half white. Barbato also has French, Irish, and Italian ancestry; the last is where his surname originates. Barbato grew up on the Near North Side of Chicago and currently resides in Los Angeles. Barbato started Geography Now! because he felt there were no channels specifically aimed at profiling every country, prompting him to create one himself. Barbato has emphasized the importance of geography education and criticized its scarcity in American curricula. As of October 2024, the conclusion of the series, he has visited 99 countries.
- Keith Everett – Music segment
- Hannah Bamberg, also known as "Random Hannah" – Culture segment
- Noah Gildermaster – Economy and Food segment
- Kaleb Seaton, formerly known as "Gary Harlow" (a "knockoff Steve Irwin") – Wildlife segment
- Arthur "Art" Napiontek – Sports segment
- Bill Rahko – Theme music composer
- Vincent Kierkels – Graphic designer/animator
- Peadar Donnelly – Graphic designer/animator
- Jared Stevenson – Graphic designer/animator
- Jason King – Graphic designer (formerly)
- Ken O'Donnell – Animator (formerly)

If the specified co-host does not appear for their segment, it will either be covered by Barbato or filled in by another crew member of Geography Now!.

Whenever possible, the channel also features guest contributors from the country being profiled. For example, Kierkels appeared in the Netherlands episode, Donnelly in the Ireland episode, and O'Donnell in the Philippines episode. Fellow internet personality Jay Foreman co-hosted the United Kingdom episode, while Barbato's mother co-hosted the South Korea episode.

Some episodes, especially ones with native co-hosts, were filmed in a makeshift studio inside the country. The Zimbabwe episode is the only one not filmed in a studio, instead taking place in the Zimbabwean countryside.

== Channel ==
=== Geography Now! ===
The channel series began on October 15, 2014, with the country of Afghanistan and concluded on October 15, 2024, with the country of Zimbabwe. The member states of the United Nations were covered in alphabetical order, with a few exceptions, such as when the country formerly named Swaziland changed its name to Eswatini after the letter E had already been passed. Another exception was the North Macedonia episode, which was released under F, because at the time, the UN listed its name as "Former Yugoslav Republic of Macedonia" to avoid controversy with Greek viewers, who consider the name "Macedonia" to be exclusively Greek. English names were also used for country titles; for example, the episode is titled "Ivory Coast" rather than "Côte d'Ivoire." Barbato has stated that he maintains a fast pace in his videos while incorporating visual graphics to enhance accessibility. Since 2025, he has started a "special edition" of the series called Gray Zone, covering (not in alphabetical order) notable non-UN countries, starting with Kosovo and with Vatican City scheduled.

- The Flag Dissection segment examined the meaning and symbolism behind each country's flag. After signing with Studio 71, this segment was moved to a separate video known as Flag/Fan Fridays, later changed to Flag/Fan Days starting with the Cuba episode, though it was brought back in the Zimbabwe episode. These segments included the opening of mail and packages sent by fans. In the current format, flag segments are separated into short-format videos, with fan mail openings held in separate live streams.
- Political Geography provided a closer look at each country's borders, enclave and exclaves, territorial disputes and anomalies, administrative divisions, overseas territories, notable locations, and more.
- Physical Geography explored each country's land makeup, demarcations, landscape, arable land, climate, biodiversity, and food.
- Demographics covered each country's population, religious affiliation, ethnic makeup, plug type, driving side, people, diversity, traditions, culture, government, notable individuals, and a brief history (if not already discussed in a previous segment).
- Friend Zone analyzed the country's positive or negative relationships with other countries.
- Conclusion wrapped up each episode into a 1-2 minute segment.

Over the course of the channel's history, the duration of the episodes increased, with more topics and information included in each episode. While early episodes typically lasted 7–10 minutes, later episodes usually ran 30–40 minutes. As of October 15, 2024, the Zimbabwe episode is the newest and final episode covering a UN-listed country. The episode on the United States of America lasted 65 minutes, making it the longest episode by far.

A "new chapter" was announced at the end of the Zimbabwe episode.

==== Flag/Fan Days ====
Flag/Fan Days, previously known as Flag/Fan Friday, were companion videos to the main episodes. In these videos, a country's flag and coat of arms are explained. Barbato also sometimes uses this opportunity to discuss topics he did not cover in the original video or to correct and clarify details. Afterward, he calls crew members and opens fan mail.

There is a recurring animation in most episodes of Flag/Fan Days where the red in a country's flag symbolizes the "blood of those who fight for their freedom", which has since become a running gag whenever the red on a country's flag is said to represent the blood of those who fought for the country in the past.

Following the release of the Venezuela–Zambia episodes, Barbato decided to turn four Flag/Fan Day videos into YouTube Shorts due to the long time it took to research, film, and produce the videos.

=== List of Geography Now episodes ===
Countries covered by Geography Now

The countries discussed in each episode follow the United Nations alphabetical list of members and go through them in the respective order.

==== UN member states ====
#	Country	Date published
1	Afghanistan	October 15, 2014
2	Albania	October 21, 2014
3	Algeria	October 30, 2014
4	Andorra	November 12, 2014
5	Angola	November 26, 2014
6	Antigua and Barbuda	December 17, 2014
7	Argentina	January 5, 2015
8	Armenia	January 16, 2015
9	Australia	January 24, 2015
10	Austria	February 6, 2015
11	Azerbaijan	February 26, 2015
12	The Bahamas	March 16, 2015
13	Bahrain	April 10, 2015
14	Bangladesh	April 18, 2015
15	Barbados	April 25, 2015
16	Belarus	May 15, 2015
17	Belgium	May 20, 2015
18	Belize	May 25, 2015
19	Benin	May 31, 2015
20	Bhutan	June 26, 2015
21	Bolivia	June 30, 2015
22	Bosnia and Herzegovina	July 9, 2015
23	Botswana	July 18, 2015
24	Brazil	August 15, 2015
25	Brunei	August 29, 2015
26	Bulgaria	September 6, 2015
27	Burkina Faso	September 15, 2015
28	Burundi	October 1, 2015
29	Cambodia	October 10, 2015
30	Cameroon	October 21, 2015
31	Canada	November 10, 2015
32	Cape Verde	December 12, 2015
33	Central African Republic	December 21, 2015
34	Chad	January 8, 2016
35	Chile	January 17, 2016
36	China	February 7, 2016
37	Colombia	February 27, 2016
38	Comoros	March 9, 2016
39	Democratic Republic of the Congo	March 29, 2016
40	Republic of the Congo	April 14, 2016
41	Costa Rica	May 7, 2016
42	Croatia	May 11, 2016
43	Cuba	May 18, 2016
44	Cyprus	May 25, 2016
45	Czech Republic	June 1, 2016
46	Denmark	June 15, 2016
47	Djibouti	June 22, 2016
48	Dominica	June 29, 2016
49	Dominican Republic	July 6, 2016
50	East Timor	August 3, 2016
51	Ecuador	August 10, 2016
52	Egypt	August 24, 2016
53	El Salvador	August 31, 2016
54	Equatorial Guinea	September 21, 2016
55	Eritrea	September 28, 2016
56	Estonia	October 5, 2016
57	Ethiopia	October 12, 2016
58	Fiji	November 15, 2016
59	Finland	November 23, 2016
60	North Macedonia	November 30, 2016
61	France	December 7, 2016
62	Gabon	January 18, 2017
63	The Gambia	January 25, 2017
64	Georgia	February 1, 2017
65	Germany	February 8, 2017
66	Ghana	March 22, 2017
67	Greece	March 29, 2017
68	Grenada	April 5, 2017
69	Guatemala	April 12, 2017
70	Guinea	May 10, 2017
71	Guinea-Bissau	May 17, 2017
72	Guyana	May 24, 2017
73	Haiti	May 31, 2017
74	Honduras	June 28, 2017
75	Hungary	July 5, 2017
76	Iceland	July 12, 2017
77	India	July 19, 2017
78	Indonesia	August 2, 2017
79	Iran	August 9, 2017
80	Iraq	August 16, 2017
81	Ireland	August 30, 2017
82	Israel	September 20, 2017
83	Italy	September 27, 2017
84	Ivory Coast	October 4, 2017
85	Jamaica	October 11, 2017
86	Japan	October 20, 2017
87	Jordan	November 1, 2017
88	Kazakhstan	November 15, 2017
89	Kenya	November 22, 2017
90	Kiribati	November 29, 2017
91	North Korea	December 13, 2017
92	South Korea	December 20, 2017
93	Kuwait	January 17, 2018
94	Kyrgyzstan	January 24, 2018
95	Laos	January 31, 2018
96	Latvia	February 7, 2018
97	Lebanon	February 28, 2018
98	Lesotho	March 7, 2018
99	Liberia	March 14, 2018
100	Libya	March 21, 2018
101	Liechtenstein	March 28, 2018
102	Lithuania	April 25, 2018
103	Luxembourg	May 2, 2018
104	Madagascar	May 23, 2018
105	Malawi	May 30, 2018
106	Malaysia	June 6, 2018
107	Eswatini	June 27, 2018
108	Maldives	July 4, 2018
109	Mali	July 11, 2018
110	Malta	August 15, 2018
111	Marshall Islands	August 22, 2018
112	Mauritania	August 29, 2018
113	Mauritius	September 5, 2018
114	Mexico	September 26, 2018
115	Federated States of Micronesia	October 10, 2018
116	Moldova	October 17, 2018
117	Monaco	November 7, 2018
118	Mongolia	November 14, 2018
119	Montenegro	December 5, 2018
120	Morocco	December 12, 2018
121	Mozambique	December 19, 2018
122	Myanmar	January 9, 2019
123	Namibia	January 16, 2019
124	Nauru	January 30, 2019
125	Nepal	February 6, 2019
126	Netherlands	February 27, 2019
127	New Zealand	April 3, 2019
128	Nicaragua	April 10, 2019
129	Niger	April 24, 2019
130	Nigeria	May 1, 2019
131	Norway	May 22, 2019
132	Oman	June 12, 2019
133	Pakistan	June 19, 2019
134	Palau	July 31, 2019
135	Panama	August 7, 2019
136	Papua New Guinea	August 28, 2019
137	Paraguay	September 4, 2019
138	Peru	September 25, 2019
139	Philippines	October 2, 2019
140	Poland	October 30, 2019
141	Portugal	November 6, 2019
142	Qatar	December 4, 2019
143	Romania	December 11, 2019
144	Russia	January 15, 2020
145	Rwanda	January 29, 2020
146	Saint Kitts and Nevis	February 19, 2020
147	Saint Lucia	March 11, 2020
148	Saint Vincent and the Grenadines	March 18, 2020
149	Samoa	April 15, 2020
150	San Marino	May 6, 2020
151	São Tomé and Príncipe	May 18, 2020
152	Saudi Arabia	June 3, 2020
153	Senegal	July 1, 2020
154	Serbia	July 22, 2020
155	Seychelles	August 12, 2020
156	Sierra Leone	September 2, 2020
157	Singapore	September 23, 2020
158	Slovakia	December 30, 2020
159	Slovenia	January 6, 2021
160	Solomon Islands	January 20, 2021
161	Somalia	February 24, 2021
162	South Africa	March 17, 2021
163	Spain	April 21, 2021
164	Sri Lanka	May 26, 2021
165	Sudan	June 23, 2021
166	South Sudan	August 4, 2021
167	Suriname	September 1, 2021
168	Sweden	September 22, 2021
169	Switzerland	October 28, 2021
170	Syria	December 8, 2021
171	Tajikistan	January 19, 2022
172	Tanzania	February 23, 2022
173	Thailand	March 27, 2022
174	Togo	April 29, 2022
175	Tonga	June 9, 2022
176	Trinidad and Tobago	July 6, 2022
177	Tunisia	August 4, 2022
178	Turkey	September 3, 2022
179	Turkmenistan	October 19, 2022
180	Tuvalu	November 23, 2022
181	Uganda	January 18, 2023
182	Ukraine	March 9, 2023
183	United Arab Emirates	March 30, 2023
184	United Kingdom	May 30, 2023
185	United States of America	July 4, 2023
186	Uruguay	September 4, 2023
187	Uzbekistan	October 31, 2023
188	Vanuatu	December 7, 2023
189	Venezuela	February 6, 2024
190	Vietnam	April 3, 2024
191	Yemen	June 19, 2024
192	Zambia	August 13, 2024
193	Zimbabwe	October 15, 2024

==== Gray Zone (partially recognized) ====
#	Country	Date published
194	Kosovo	July 29, 2025

=== Other content ===
Filler week videos occurred when the team was in the process of researching and creating scripts for upcoming episodes. Topics discussed in these videos included states or subregions of countries, current or cultural events, physical geography, specific ethnic groups, and infrastructure innovations.

Geography Go is the channel's travel vlog series. Countries visited include but are not limited to Qatar, Finland, Estonia, Greenland, Bahrain, Saudi Arabia, the United Arab Emirates, Malaysia, Ukraine, Turkmenistan, Indonesia and Singapore. Barbato also later started posting YouTube Shorts on his channel about his travels to other countries like Slovakia, Slovenia, Poland, Croatia, the Central African Republic, Togo, and many others.

A Geograbee is the geography equivalent of a spelling bee, where participants are tested on geography. So far, Barbato has hosted these events in Hargeisa in Somaliland, Somalia, and Alaska. Other educational content is also uploaded.

==== Geography Now City Guides ====
Geography Now City Guides is a series that focuses on cities, where Barbato travels to the city and profiles the city's culture.

- The "learn" segment covered a brief history of the city.
- The "go" segment explored how to get around and into the city.
- The "do" segment provided information of what to do in the city.
- The "eat" segment covers restaurants that provide traditional food.

#	City	Date published
1	(Colombia) Bogotá	September 7, 2025
2	(United States) Los Angeles	December 25, 2025
3	(China) Chengdu	January 31, 2026

==== Letters ====
Letters are semi-autobiographical documentaries (some people refer to them as vlogs) where Barbato covers countries he visited (preferably with family or a small group) and "writes" a letter or more specifically referred to as an email to the countries he visits and covers. Barbato tries not to focus on certain topics so he can talk more about his experiences in the videos and avoid controversy like ongoing geopolitical conflicts. He often includes topics like culture, eccentric sights, food, and tradition.

==== April Fools episodes ====
Every April Fools' Day, Geography Now! uploads videos profiling fictional countries created by himself (with the exception of 2025 and the 2016 and 2017 videos). These include:

- Bandiaterra (2015), a Danish-speaking island nation in the Indian Ocean.
- Limberwisk (2018), a Nordic country whose language consists entirely of whispers.
- Patch Amberdash / Datcsh (2019), a confederation of islands spread across three continents.
- Qitzikwaka (2020), a former Russian colony situated underground in the Sahara.
- Sovonthak (2021), a country situated on eight shallow reefs with a legally-recognized and taxed bartering system.
- Volanca (2022), a country with no territory, founded by UN interpreters, with citizens' residences serving as legal lodging.
- Ululiona-Linulu (2023), a sovereign Native American country created as a buffer between Mexico and the United States after the Mexican–American War.
- Geolandia (2024), a federation comprising all previous April Fools' countries. Citizenship is acquired by subscribing to Geography Now and purchasing its merchandise.

== Reception ==
Geography Now! generally receives positive feedback from newspapers and magazines in the countries covered, such as Japan Today, Télérama, Dutch Metro, RTL, Nezavisne Novine, Life in Norway, Lovin Malta, and Zoznam. It has also received endorsements from educators and travel writers. The channel has appeared on several lists of recommended educational YouTube channels, including one by the Van Andel Institute.

A few criticisms typically relate to tone and pronunciation, particularly in earlier episodes.
