= Champion of the World (song) =

2020 single by Coldplay

- Live version cover artwork

Promotional single by Coldplay

from the album Everyday Life
- Language: English; Igbo
- Released: 24 February 2020
- Genre: Rock; pop rock
- Length: 4:17
- Label: Parlophone; Atlantic
- Songwriters: Guy Berryman; Jonny Buckland; Will Champion; Chris Martin; Scott Hutchison
- Producers: Bill Rahko; Daniel Green; Rik Simpson

Music video
- "Champion of the World" on YouTube

"Champion of the World" is a song by British rock band Coldplay from their eighth studio album Everyday Life. It was first released on 20 November 2019 along with "Daddy" in anticipation for the record. Despite being sent to selected radio stations in the United States and Italy, the song was not marketed as an official single.

== Background ==
"Champion of the World" is the seventh track of the Sunset part of the album and was written by the all members of Coldplay. It opens with Otuto Nke Chukwu as performed by Harcourt Whyte. The song contains elements from "Los Angeles, Be Kind" by Scott Hutchison's Owl John, as explained by Chris Martin: "When I first heard it, I thought it was going to go one way; but it went another. Anyway 'Champion of the World' is the song that came from following the other path, and that's why Scott is a co-writer on this song".

== Music video ==
On 25 February 2020, a music video directed by Cloé Bailly was made available on Coldplay's YouTube channel. It was filmed in Los Angeles and expressed the "magic power that kids have to switch off from reality and jump into their own world.

== Reception ==
While reviewing Everyday Life (2019), Ella Kemp from the British GQ declared that "Champion of the World" was the best song from the album. Similarly, Jenesaispop ranked it among the best tracks of 2019.

== Track listing ==
Digital download; streaming
| No. | Title | Length |
|---|---|---|
| 1. | "Champion of the World" | 4:17 |

Digital download – Live at NPR's Tiny Desk
| No. | Title | Length |
|---|---|---|
| 1. | "Champion of the World" (Live at NPR's Tiny Desk) | 3:36 |

== Charts ==
=== Weekly charts ===
Weekly chart performance
| Chart (2019–2020) | Peak position |
|---|---|
| Belgium (Ultratip Bubbling Under Flanders) | 37 |
| Belgium (Ultratip Bubbling Under Wallonia) | 27 |
| Iceland (Tónlistinn) | 36 |
| Italy Airplay (EarOne) | 13 |
| Netherlands (Dutch Top 40 Tipparade) | 7 |
| New Zealand Hot Singles (RMNZ) | 25 |
| San Marino (SMRRTV Top 50) | 49 |
| Switzerland (Schweizer Hitparade) | 56 |
| UK Singles (Official Charts) | 93 |
| US Hot Rock & Alternative Songs (Billboard) | 13 |
| US Rock & Alternative Airplay (Billboard) | 40 |

=== Year-end charts ===
Year-end chart performance
| Chart (2020) | Position |
|---|---|
| Italy Airplay (EarOne) | 93 |

== Release history ==
Release dates and formats
| Region | Date | Format | Label | Ref. |
|---|---|---|---|---|
| United States | 24 February 2020 | Adult album alternative radio | Atlantic | |
| United States | 25 February 2020 | Alternative radio | Atlantic | |
| Italy | 1 May 2020 | Contemporary hit radio | Warner | |
