= Poringland =

Village in Norfolk, England

Coordinates: 52.56552°N 1.35031°E

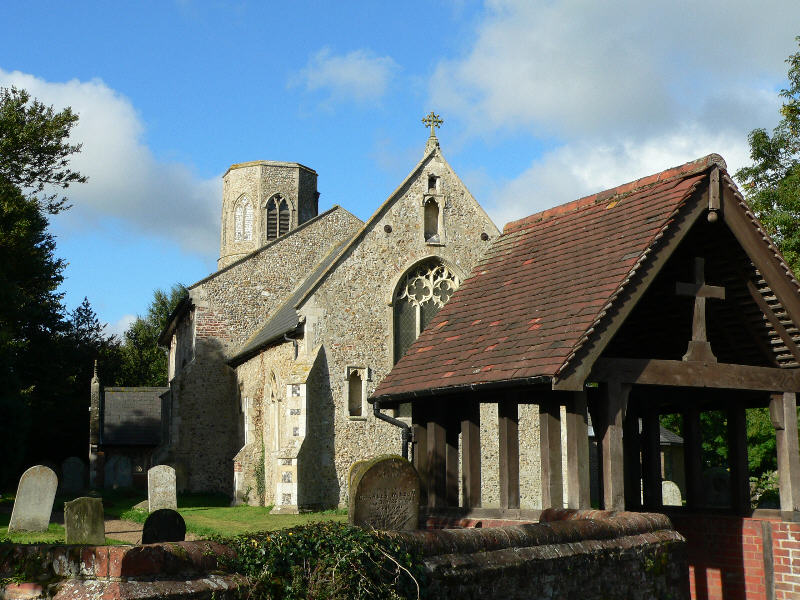
- Poringland All Saints

- Location within Norfolk
- Area: 6.32 km^{2} (2.44 sq mi)
- Population: 3,802
  - Density: 602/km^{2} (1,560/sq mi)
- OS grid reference: TG271016
- Civil parish: Poringland
- District: South Norfolk
- Shire county: Norfolk
- Region: East
- Country: England
- Sovereign state: United Kingdom
- Post town: NORWICH
- Postcode district: NR14
- Dialling code: 01508
- Police: Norfolk
- Fire: Norfolk
- Ambulance: East of England
- UK Parliament: South Norfolk

Poringland is a village in the South Norfolk district of Norfolk, England. It lies 5 miles (8.0 km) south of Norwich city centre and 10 miles (16 km) north of Bungay. Its population has rapidly grown in the past 50 years. It covers an area of 6.32 km^{2} (2.44 sq mi) and had a population of 3,261 living in 1,403 households at the 2001 census, the population increasing to 3,802 at the 2011 Census.

== History ==
Poringland was previously also known as both East Poringland and Great Poringland, and was part of the ancient Hundred of Henstead. The place name Poringland is first attested in the Domesday Book of 1086, where it appears as 'Porringhelanda', the meaning of which is uncertain. Some believe the name derives from 'Poor spring land', because it has poor soil, containing much clay.

The church of Poringland All Saints is one of 124 existing round-tower churches in Norfolk.

The village sign, which stands close to the church and the village pond, depicts the artist John Crome, founder of the Norwich School of artists, working on his famous painting 'The Poringland Oak'. Cromes Oak Close in the village is named after the artist. Many of Crome's paintings are available to view at the Norwich Castle Museum. The original of the Poringland Oak hangs in Room 7 at Tate Britain.

== Modern ==
This village contains many public services, including two pubs, a supermarket, estate agents', takeaways, a restaurant and various shops.

The village of Framingham Earl which borders Poringland, contains the local High School. The River Chet (Norfolk) rises in Poringland.

== Governance ==
Poringland is part of the electoral ward called Poringland with the Framinghams. The population as of the 2011 census was 4,826.

== Notable residents ==
The German writer W.G. Sebald lived in Poringland until his death in a car crash in 2001. A former Norwich City and Scotland international footballer Robert Fleck also lived in Poringland. Ronan Parke, runner-up of Britain's Got Talent in 2011, also resides in the village, as does former Norwich City and Everton manager, Mike Walker.
