= Ronan Parke (album) =

Studio album by Ronan Parke
- Released: 24 October 2011
- Recorded: July–September 2011
- Genre: Pop
- Label: Syco Music, Sony Music

Singles from Ronan Parke
- 1. "A Thousand Miles" Released: 24 October 2011

Ronan Parke is the debut studio album by English singer Ronan Parke. It was released in the UK on 24 October 2011. The album consisted mostly of cover songs.

== Background ==
Parke revealed on his Facebook page on 31 August that the official video for "A Thousand Miles", the first track from the album, would be released on 12 September, with the lyric video being released on 2 September. The video also revealed that "Forget You" and "Feeling Good" would be on the album amongst others.

It was reported in The Sun on 6 September that Gary Barlow had penned a track for the album called "Stronger Than I Am". Fellow BGT finalist Paul Gbegbaje provided piano backing on "A Thousand Miles".

== Promotion ==
During 2011, Parke appeared on:

- T4 on the Beach – 10 July, performing "Forget You";
- QVC – 10 October, performing "Feeling Good" and "A Thousand Miles";
- This Morning – 18 October, performing ″The Edge of Glory″;
- BBC Breakfast – 21 October, performing "The Edge of Glory";
- The CBBC show Sam & Mark's Big Friday Wind-Up – 21 October, performing "A Thousand Miles";
- Blue Peter – 24 October, performing "A Thousand Miles", with Barney Harwood providing piano backing;
- The Alan Titchmarsh Show – 25 October, performing "Feeling Good";
- OK! TV – 28 October.

== Singles ==
"A Thousand Miles", originally by Vanessa Carlton, is the first and lead single from the album. The music video, which premiered on 14 September, features Parke against various coloured backgrounds, with lyrics from the track appearing on the screen. The track was also released on 24 October.

== Track listing ==
No.	Title	Writer(s)	Length
1.	"Feeling Good"	Anthony Newley, Leslie Bricusse	2:45
2.	"Forget You"	Christopher "Brody" Brown, Peter Hernandez, Cee Lo Green, Philip Lawrence, Ari Levine	3:42
3.	"A Thousand Miles"	Vanessa Carlton	3:59
4.	"Fix You"	Coldplay	4:27
5.	"Because of You"	Kelly Clarkson, David Hodges, Ben Moody	3:39
6.	"You Gotta Be"	Des'ree, Ashley Ingram	3:37
7.	"Make You Feel My Love"	Bob Dylan	3:14
8.	"Songbird"	Christine McVie	3:41
9.	"We'll Rock the World"		3:58
10.	"Stronger Than I Am"	Gary Barlow	3:46
11.	"The Edge of Glory (acoustic)"	Stefani Germanotta, Fernando Garibay, Paul Blair	3:15
12.	"Firework (acoustic)"	Katy Perry, Mikkel S. Eriksen, Tor Erik Hermansen, Sandy Wilhelm, Ester Dean	4:06

== Charts ==
Chart (2012)	Peak position
Scottish Albums Chart	32
UK Albums Chart	22

== Release history ==
Region	Date	Format	Label
United Kingdom	24 October 2011	Digital download, CD	Syco Music
