= Act Three (G4 album) =

Studio album by G4
- Released: 27 November 2006
- Genre: Popera
- Label: Sony BMG
- Producer: Graham Stack

G4 chronology
G4 & Friends (2005)	Act Three (2006)	The Hits (2007)

Professional ratings
Review scores
Source	Rating
Allmusic	2/5 stars

Act Three was the third album to be released by X Factor runners-up G4. The album included a duet with Stephen Gately on the song "No Matter What", Gately having sung the lead on the original version of the song with his band Boyzone. This was the third album of rock, pop and traditional classics sung in operatic pop style by the group. Being released in the same week as the third album by the similar band, Il Divo, Act Three peaked at #21 in the UK charts with first week sales of 37,487. Act Three was also the last album with Matthew Stiff singing bass.

== Track listing ==
1. "Volare"
2. "Somebody to Love"
3. "Danny Boy"
4. "O Sole Mio"
5. "Amazing Grace"
6. "No Matter What" (with Stephen Gately)
7. "I Don't Like Mondays"
8. "Crazy"
9. "Cavatina"
10. "Toreador"
11. "Old and Wise"
12. "We'll Meet Again"
13. "Silent Night"

== Charts ==
=== Weekly charts ===
Chart (2006)	Peak position
Irish Albums (IRMA)	50
Scottish Albums (OCC)	23
UK Albums (OCC)	21

=== Year-end charts ===
Chart (2006)	Position
UK Albums (OCC)	154
