= Framingham Earl High School =

Framingham Earl High School FEHS

Location
- Norwich Road; Norwich, Norfolk, NR14 7QP; England
- Coordinates: 52°34′51″N 1°20′18″E

Information
- Type: Academy
- Motto: Anything's possible
- Local authority: Norfolk
- Trust: Sapentia Education Trust
- Department for Education URN: 145776 Tables
- Ofsted: Reports
- Chair: Peter Porter
- Headteacher: Rebecca Arnold
- Gender: Coeducational
- Age: 11 to 16
- Enrollment: 768
- Capacity: 810
- Website: http://www.framinghamearl.net/

Framingham Earl High School is a secondary school located in Framingham Earl in the English county of Norfolk to the south of Norwich.

The school enrolls pupils aged 11 – 16, typically with around 800 students.

== Curriculum ==
Virtually all maintained schools and academies follow the National Curriculum, and are inspected by Ofsted on how well they succeed in delivering a 'broad and balanced curriculum'. The English Baccalaureate is promoted, enabling the Progress 8 benchmark. The school has to decide whether Key Stage 3 contains years 7, 8 and 9 or whether year 9 should be in Key Stage 4 alongside years 10 and 11. In Key Stage 4, students restrict their studies to subjects that will be examined by the GCSE exams at 16.

Framingham Earl High School retains a three-year Key Stage 3 curriculum and a two-year Key Stage 4 curriculum, although where appropriate certain subject areas construct a five-year programme. This ensures the broadest curriculum offer is retained for as long as possible. "The planned curriculum aims to broaden horizons and increase the cultural capital of the students and be creative."

The school retains a broad curriculum, embracing the arts and technical subjects, to which significant time is allocated at KS3 to offer as options for GCSE. All students study a full course GCSE in Citizenship which includes a requirement for an action project. The predominant Modern Foreign Language is French, although Spanish is also taught.

== COVID-19 ==
Like all schools in England, FEHS went into lockdown, accepting pupils of key workers. The technology department used their skills and 3D printers to produce PPE face visors for the local Norfolk and Norwich University Hospital.

== Sports Centre ==
A community sports centre was built on the school site in 2005–2006. It was managed by FEHS, and attracted 13,000 users each year. The Sapentia Education Trust passed the management back to South Norfolk District Council in April 2020.

== Notable former pupils ==
- Ronan Parke - Britain's Got Talent, runner up 2011
- Jake Humphrey - BBC Sports Presenter, BT Sports Presenter
- Angus Gunn - Norwich City Goalkeeper
