= Believe (Jai McDowall album) =

Studio album by Jai McDowall
- Released: 9 December 2011
- Recorded: August–October 2011
- Genre: classical crossover
- Length: 39:22
- Label: Syco Music, Sony Music
- Producer: Steve Mac, Jai McDowall

Jai McDowall chronology
Believe (2011)	Christmas With... (2013)

Believe is the debut studio album by Scottish singer and Britain's Got Talent winner Jai McDowall. The album was released on 12 December 2011 via Sony Music and Syco Music. A promotional single, "With or Without You" was released and performed on various UK shows such as Daybreak.

== Background ==
McDowall secured a recording contract after winning the fifth series of ITV talent show Britain's Got Talent on 4 June 2011, beating bookies favorite Ronan Parke. It was reported that after successful meetings between McDowall and judge Simon Cowell, McDowall had been signed by Cowell's record label Syco, and that he had secured a two-album deal in August 2011. Following the signing, McDowall took part in the Britain's Got Talent Live Tour, which saw him perform in several cities in his native country, including Newcastle, Edinburgh, Aberdeen and Glasgow. He later performed at select dates throughout England. In September 2011, he performed live at the official 2011 Glasgow Annual Show in front of 20,000 people.

== Recording ==
On 3 September 2011, it was confirmed that McDowall would be recording a duet with classical soprano Hayley Westenra at some point in the near future. It was soon revealed that the pair were to record a modern version of "The Prayer", a song made famous by Celine Dion and Andrea Bocelli in 1999. McDowall stated in an interview, “When Simon said I should record The Prayer with Hayley, I jumped at the chance. She has the most incredible delicate vocal and she was a dream to work with.” On 3 October 2011, it was confirmed that McDowall's record label Syco had created a joint deal with Sony Music Entertainment to promote his debut album. As such, a music video for one of the album's tracks, "With or Without You", was filmed on Brighton Beach in October 2011, and will be serviced to music channels on 9 December 2011 in promotion of the album. On 26 October, it was announced that the album would be titled Believe, and would receive a release on 12 December 2011.

== Production ==
The album is being entirely produced by Steve Mac, who is known to have worked with the likes of Leona Lewis, Leon Jackson, Susan Boyle and many other acts signed to the Syco label. McDowall stated in an interview: "I've pretty much had creative control over the album. I'll be honest, I was quite surprised with the amount of input I had with the tracks, the cover artwork, and the image. When you talk to previous reality contestants, they tend to say they didn't get that much control. It's an awful, strange thing, cos I was like - I got a lot! Obviously I didn't get complete control, I'm new at it and I don't know the ins and outs. I was quite happy to hand over most of it, to be honest. I think I'd get bored in the studio trying to edit clips of my own voice. I was brought up with a lot of country music like Kenny Rogers, but I've got quite eclectic tastes and have everything from Iron Maiden to Britney Spears on my iPod. I like a lot of R&B but I also love choral music. It kind of depends on my mood but I'm very open-minded about music. The album has a mixture of all sorts, really.

== Track listing ==
No.	Title	Writer(s)	Length
1.	"With or Without You" (featuring Scala & Kolacny Brothers)	Paul Hewson, David Howell Evans, Larry Mullen, Adam Clayton	3:35
2.	"To Where You Are"	Alan Menken, Richard Marx, Linda Thompson	3:49
3.	"Fix You"	Chris Martin, Jonny Buckland, Guy Berryman, Will Champion	3:48
4.	"The Prayer" (featuring Hayley Westenra)	David Foster, Carole Bayer Sager	4:21
5.	"How You Remind Me"	Chad Kroeger, Ryan Peake, Mike Kroeger, Daniel Adair	3:21
6.	"There You'll Be"	Diane Warren	3:36
7.	"Feels Like Home"	Randy Newman	3:43
8.	"Bring Me to Life"	Amy Lee, Ben Moody, David Hodges	3:42
9.	"Boulevard of Broken Dreams"	Billie Joe Armstrong, Mike Dirnt, Tre Cool	2:35
10.	"One Day Like This"	Guy Garvey, Mark Potter, Craig Potter, Richard Jupp, Pete Turner	3:05
Total length:			39:22

== Chart performance ==
=== Chart positions ===
Chart (2011)	Peak position
UK Albums Chart	54
Scottish Albums Chart	19

=== Certifications and sales ===
- United Kingdom: 11,336
- Scotland: 15,000+

== Release history ==
Region	Date	Format	Label
Ireland	9 December 2011	Digital download, CD	Syco Music
United Kingdom	12 December 2011	Digital download, CD	Syco Music
