= Hearts of England =

Single by Jonathan Ansell

from the album Forever
- Released: UK: To be announced, 2008
- Recorded: 2008
- Genre: Classical
- Label: UCJ
- Songwriter(s): Patrick Hawes and Andrew Hawes

"Hearts of England" is the title of England team anthem for the 2008 Rugby League World Cup. The song was performed by Jonathan Ansell and produced by Universal Music in partnership with the Rugby Football League.

== Theme ==
Composer Patrick Hawes and his librettist brother Andrew Hawes wrote the patriotic piece to inspire the English team and their supporters. The main idea was to encapsulate the "traditions and heartlands of rugby league in this country as well as evoking the heroism and commitment of international teams competing on the world sporting stage".

== Lyrics ==
By the sea’s rolling tide;
By the wide Pennine sky;
By the skill found in
Shipyard and mine;
By raw courage and love,
When our journey is tough,
The hearts of England are made.

By bonds thicker than blood
Binding evil with good,
By the strength born
Of family and home;
In the furnace of hope
On the anvil of will,
The hearts of England are made.

Stand up men of steel
And make all the world feel
The strength of your hand
And your eye.
By sweet victory gained
By faith and through pain
The hearts of England are made.

(Lyrics by Andrew Hawes courtesy of Hawes Music Ltd)

== Live performances ==
Ansell performed the song live at rugby league's Challenge Cup Final at Wembley Stadium on Saturday, 30 August 2008.

The song is expected to be performed live before England's World Cup matches in Australia.
