= Jai McDowall =

Scottish singer-songwriter

- Born: Jai McDowall; 24 July 1986 (age 40); Irvine, North Ayrshire, Scotland
- Origin: Tarbolton, South Ayrshire, Scotland
- Genres: rock, opera, classical crossover
- Occupation: Singer-songwriter
- Instrument: Vocals
- Years active: 2009–present
- Labels: Syco, Sony (2011–12); WIR Records (2012–13); Crossfire Talent (2013–present)
- Member of: G4
- Website: Official website

Jai McDowall (born 24 July 1986) is a Scottish singer-songwriter, who won the fifth series of Britain's Got Talent in June 2011. As the winner, he received £100,000 and performed at the 2011 Royal Variety Performance. McDowall was signed to Syco Music, a subdivision of record label giant, Sony Music. His debut album Believe was released on 9 December 2011. The lead single "With or Without You" was released the same day.

In March 2012, he was dropped by Syco after poor sales of his debut album. It was reported that the singer claimed that Syco boss, Simon Cowell, was anti-Scottish. He later released two extended plays, Christmas With... and Cry, Home, Closer on digital download format. His 2013 single "Won't Forget", featuring the Clutha Appeal, was released following the helicopter crash at the Clutha bar in Glasgow, and reaching number seventeen on the Scottish Singles Charts.

From 2023-2025 he was the low tenor of the group G4, having replaced previous member Lewis Raines.

== Early and personal life ==
McDowall was raised in Tarbolton in Ayrshire, Scotland where he worked as a support worker prior to winning Britain's Got Talent. He was a member of the Ayr Amateur Opera Company and Loudoun Musical Society. He played roles such as Frank in Seven Brides for Seven Brothers and Motel in Fiddler on the Roof.

Before his job of looking after young people with disabilities, McDowall spent two years studying Music and Audio Technology (NC & HNC) at Music and Sound Production Dept, Ayr College, Scotland. In 2012, it was misreported that McDowall called Simon Cowell 'anti-Scottish' in a news article. Reacting to the story, Cowell defended himself on Britain's Got More Talent saying that his mother was Scottish and reminded McDowall that he signed and still works with Susan Boyle who is Scottish.

== Music career ==
=== 2009–2011: Early career ===
Before Britain's Got Talent, he appeared as a contestant on The X Factor and The American Idol Experience. McDowall auditioned for The American Idol Experience whilst on holiday in the US in 2009, and won. He also auditioned for The X Factor in 2010 and reached boot camp but lost out on a place in the live shows.

=== 2011: Britain's Got Talent ===
McDowall auditioned in Liverpool for the fifth series of Britain's Got Talent with "Anthem" from Chess, receiving very positive comments from all of the three judges, Michael McIntyre, Amanda Holden and David Hasselhoff. He received three yesses and was put through to the next round, and through to the live semi-finals. McDowall performed for a second time in the semi-final on 2 June 2011, singing "Bring Me to Life" by Evanescence. He once again received positive comments from the judges including Cowell. McDowall received the highest number of votes on the night and was automatically put through to the final.

In the final, McDowall performed "To Where You Are" by Josh Groban. He once again received positive comments from all four judges, despite some criticism from judge Simon Cowell, who stated that the vocal was 'monotone'. This comment was acknowledged by McDowall. During the result, Simon later complimented McDowall on his rendition of the song after he had won the top prize of £100,000. McDowall was announced as the winner with 29.1% of the vote, approximately 4.1 million, which proved a shock as he beat bookies' favourite Ronan Parke. It was later revealed on Britain's Got More Talent that there was a margin of 2.4% of the vote, approximately 86,000, between McDowall and runner-up Ronan Parke. He won £100,000 and a spot at the 2011 Royal Variety Performance.

After winning Britain's Got Talent, McDowall performed on the Britain's Got Talent Tour. Starting in Newcastle and moving through 3 Scottish cities Edinburgh, Aberdeen and Glasgow before heading through England and appearing in the major venues in most major cities. He performed at the 2011 Glasgow Show on Glasgow Green in front of 20,000 people, headlining the Sunday show along with Re-Take That and other guests. In August 2011, he secured a record deal with Syco and Sony Music to be released in December 2011. In October 2011, McDowall performed a sell out headline show at the Grand Hall, Kilmarnock. He also headlined the end of season shows at the main Butlins sites during the October Holiday Break before appearing in the Royal Variety show.

McDowall was also invited to sing with Josh Groban in the Royal Concert Hall in his performance of "To Where You Are" and they both received a standing ovation for their rendition of Groban's hit song.

=== 2011–2019: Believe ===
On 3 October 2011, it was confirmed that McDowall, as well as Sony Music Entertainment and Syco Music to promote his debut album, has also hired Soundcheck Entertainment to aid in the promotion of the forthcoming the album which was released in December 2011. McDowall announced on 26 October that the album would be titled Believe and would be released on 12 December. Jai explained: "Being in the studio was everything I hoped it would be and I loved the whole creative process. I like the style of singing I did on Britain's Got Talent – a kind of mix of musical and pop – so we’re working along those lines." He told STV, in reference to Susan Boyle: "I think it's a fantastic thing. If I get even half of her success it's going to be absolutely amazing for me. It's dead funny cause people are calling me Jai-Bo!" In 2012, McDowall sang his album lead track, "With or Without You" on China's Got Talent although oddly enough, no license was applied for to sell his single or album in China.

It was confirmed by Sony in March 2012 that, after fulfilling his one-album contract, McDowall's deal will not be renewed. In 2013, McDowall was asked to and agreed to perform at the March & Rally for Scottish Independence.

=== 2019–2021: Cry, Home, Closer ===
In September 2019, McDowall returned to prime time television performing on Series 1 of Britain's Got Talent: The Champions. Whilst McDowall did not progress to the final stages of the competition, his performance was well received by the judges and viewers, with many citing McDowall's on stage persona and vocal abilities maturing since his original win in 2011. Since winning the show in 2011, and the lack of promotion of his debut album and a lack of support from Simon Cowell following his win and towards the release of his debut album, Cowell issued a public apology to McDowall immediately after his performance. Cowell admitted that the lack of support McDowall received from him was "unfair" and ended in McDowall receiving a standing ovation from Cowell (who immediately after his Champions performance did not stand alongside fellow judges David Walliams, Alesha Dixon and Amanda Holden).

In 2019, McDowall released a three track extended play entitled Cry, Home, Closer. McDowall supported singer Susan Boyle on her 2020 UK arena tour.

=== 2021–present: G4 ===
In 2021, McDowall released a new single entitled "All of Me", a cover of the song released by John Legend to mark ten years since his appearance on Britain's Got Talent in 2011. The song made an appearance on the UK iTunes Charts, debuting at number 91 where it remained in its second week before falling out of the top 100. McDowall featured and performed in a UK musical production of Come What May which began in late 2021. He also performed two tours with Jonathan Ansell of Les Musicals. In 2023, McDowall joined the vocal troupe G4, replacing original member Lewis Raines. In December 2023, McDowall featured in a BBC Scotland documentary hosted by Michelle McManus entitled Michelle McManus: Talent Show Winners, where McDowall spoke about his subsequent career following his win on Britain's Got Talent and joining G4 earlier in the year.

== Discography ==
=== Studio albums ===
List of albums, with selected chart positions and certifications
Title	Album details	Peak chart positions		Sales
Title	Album details	UK	SCO	Sales
Believe	Released: 9 December 2011; Label: Syco, Sony Music; Formats: CD, digital download	54	19	United Kingdom: 11,336; Scotland: 15,000
"—" denotes releases that did not chart or were not released

=== Extended plays ===
List of albums, with selected chart positions and certifications
Title	Album details	Peak chart positions		Sales
Title	Album details	UK	SCO	Sales
Christmas With...	Released: 24 November 2013; Label: WiR Records; Formats: digital download	-	-	
Cry, Home, Closer	Released: 13 March 2019; Label: WiR Records, Crossfire; Formats: digital download	-	-	
"—" denotes releases that did not chart or were not released

=== Singles ===
Year	Single	Peak chart positions			Album
Year	Single	UK	IRL	SCO	Album
2011	"With or Without You"	—	—	—	Believe
2012	"Better than a Broken Heart"	—	—	—	Single-releases only
2012	"Unforgettable"	—	—	—	Single-releases only
2013	"Got To Let Go"	—	—	—	Single-releases only
2013	"Fall Back Down"	—	—	—	Single-releases only
2013	"Won't Forget" (as part of the Clutha Appeal)	—	—	17	Single-releases only
2013	"Here We Stand" (featuring The Teenage Cancer Trust Band)	—	—	—	Single-releases only
2014	"I Begin Again" (Co-Written by Anthony Fedorov and Bill Grainer )	—	—	—	Single-releases only
2017	"You Raise Me Up"	—	—	—	Single-releases only
2017	"Cry"	—	—	—	Cry, Home, Closer
2020	"Ain't Talked in a While"	—	—	—	Single-release only
2021	"All Of Me"	—	—	—	Single-release only

Preceded by Spelbound	Winner of Britain's Got Talent; 2011	Succeeded by Ashleigh and Pudsey
