= G4 (group) =

British vocal troupe

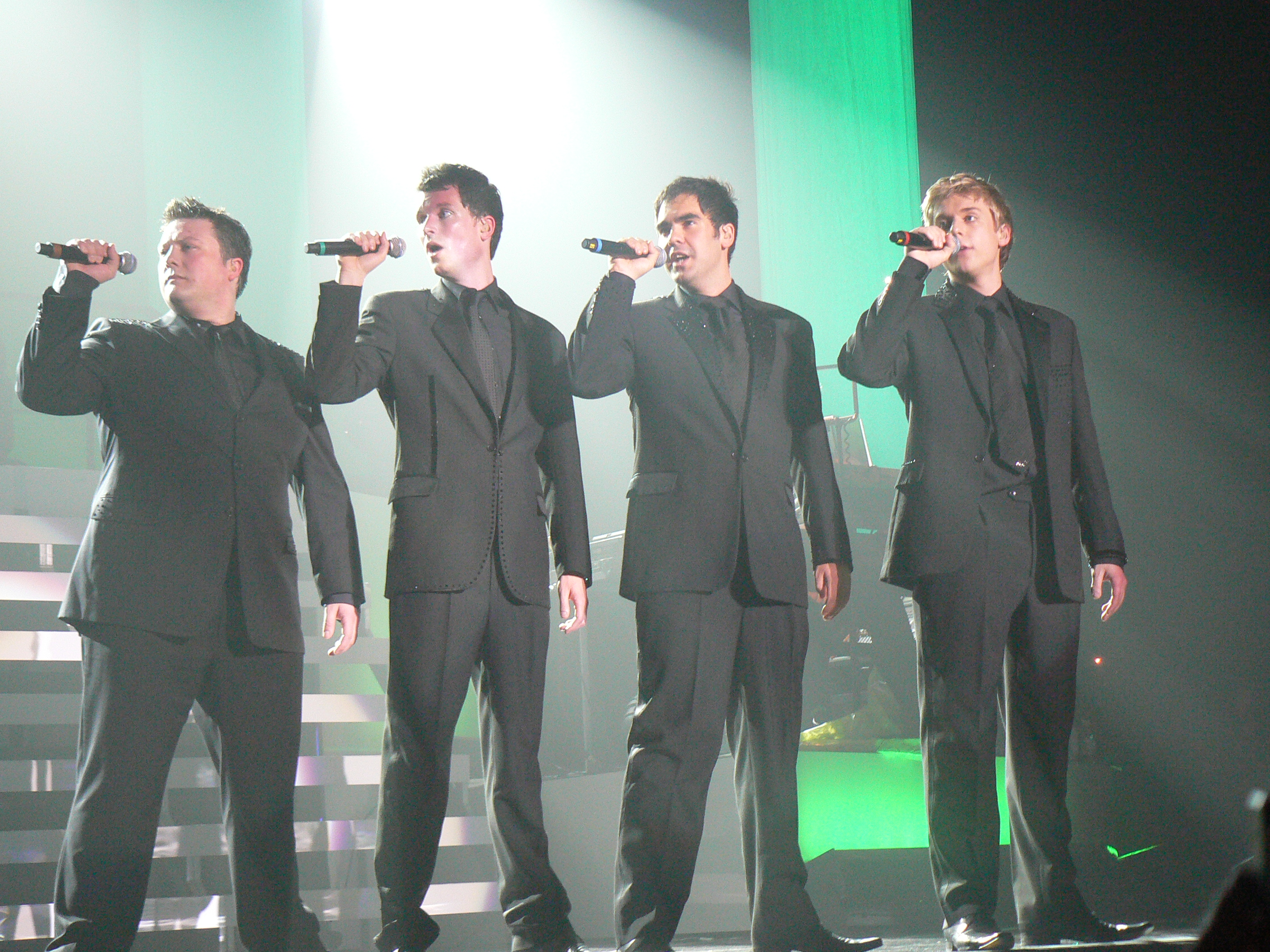
- G4 Lineup 2004–2007 (from left to right, Matthew Stiff, Mike Christie, Ben Thapa, Jonathan Ansell)

Background information
- Origin: Guildhall, London
- Genres: Operatic pop; vocal; swing
- Years active: 2004–2007; 2014–present
- Labels: Sony BMG; BMG; Amick Productions
- Members: Jonathan Ansell; Mike Christie; Duncan Sandilands; Michael Conway
- Past members: Matthew Stiff; Ben Thapa; Nick Ashby; Lewis Raines; Tom Lowe; Jai McDowall
- Website: www.g4official.com

G4 are a four-piece British vocal troupe who first came to prominence when they finished second in Series 1 of The X Factor in 2004, and are known for their operatic delivery of modern pop songs. Originally a barbershop quartet, the members met at the Guildhall School of Music and Drama, from which the name G4, standing for "Guildhall 4", derives.

In 2007 the band disbanded, citing disagreements among the members, but reunited in 2014 to celebrate their ten-year anniversary with a number of concerts nationwide, leading to a new album for Christmas 2015.

The group currently consists of original members tenor Jonathan Ansell and baritone Mike Christie, with Michael Conway joining after Jai McDowall left in 2025, while Duncan Sandilands replaced former bass singer Nick Ashby in 2019, who had replaced original bass Matt Stiff in 2014.

== History ==
=== 2004:The X Factor ===
In 2004, shortly after Stiff replaced original bass Tom Lowe, G4 spontaneously applied to The X Factor with the intention of using the show to obtain a quote on posters for upcoming concerts and gain publicity – prior to this they performed as buskers during their free time at college to earn extra money and gain experience. Although the band members originally took it in turns to sing lead, Simon Cowell – who had dismissed them as "fat buskers" – suggested that Ansell be promoted to the group's frontman. Mentored by Louis Walsh, they reached the final, and to date G4 remain one of only two classical-based acts to compete in the live shows, the other being Welsh baritone Rhydian – coincidentally, both placed second in Series 1 and 4 respectively, but outsold the eventual winners. Cowell, who had mentored Series 1 champion Steve Brookstein, later admitted that G4 were the real winners of the competition.

Despite their success on the show, G4 later branded The X Factor as a pantomime due to staged conflict between the judges which overshadowed the contestants. Bass singer Stiff also stated "Backstage Simon would say we were great, but then on camera say nothing. I don't think he wanted us to win and by choosing what he said on camera he knew he had the power to sway votes. He is the ringmaster". In 2013, none of G4's singles appeared on The X Factor – Greatest Hits album.

=== X Factor performances ===
Stage	Song	Placement
Audition	"Bohemian Rhapsody"	–
Bootcamp	Original song "Right Now", "I Swear", and "Danny Boy"	–
Judges' houses	"Creep"	–
Week 1	"Everybody Hurts"	Safe
Week 2	"Don't Look Back in Anger"	Safe
Week 3	"...Baby One More Time"	Safe
Week 4	"Circle of Life"	Bottom Two
Week 5	"My Way"	Safe
Quarter-Final	"You'll Never Walk Alone" and "Somebody to Love"	Safe
Semi-Final	"O Holy Night" and "Bohemian Rhapsody"	Safe
Final	"Nessun Dorma", "Bohemian Rhapsody" and "Creep"	Runners-up

=== 2005: G4 and G4 and Friends ===
After The X Factor, G4 signed a £1.5 million album deal with Sony BMG. Having not been picked up by Cowell, Sony A&R Nick Raphael said that his label decided to pursue the band, stating: "We felt that they were the best act on the show." With the rules of The X Factor allowing any non-winning band or artist to sign with anyone, Sony competed with Universal and EMI for G4's signatures. Raphael believed their mentor-turned-manager Walsh accepted Sony BMG's advances because the company had a plan of how to work with them as opposed to their competitors who merely had a desire to sign the band. In addition, Sony also had a definitive date to release any albums and merchandise, as well as organised structure to make their records. During this time, Ansell, who had previously auditioned to be a member of Il Divo, was offered the role of Prince Tamino in Kenneth Branagh's modern adaptation of The Magic Flute, but turned it down to remain with the band.

The debut album, G4, was released on 28 February 2005, and contained classical covers of popular pop songs, most of which had been performed on The X Factor like "Everybody Hurts", with a few opera tunes such as "Nessun Dorma" and "Flower Duet". Most of the tracks are produced by Graham Stack and Brian Rawling. The debut single, "Bohemian Rhapsody" cover, was released on 14 March 2005, and entered the charts at #9. Following the success of G4, G4 embarked on a 25-day arena tour. The album debuted at the number one spot in the UK Albums Chart on the Mother's Day weekend selling 244,671 copies in the first week, becoming the fastest-selling album of 2005. It has sold 611,000 copies as of December 2012.

G4 & Friends was released on 28 November 2005, and followed the same format as their first album, but also included collaborations with Lesley Garrett and Robin Gibb, both of whom were special guests during the group's UK tour. Their recording of "Miss You Nights" with original artist Cliff Richard was also featured on the latter's album Two's Company The Duets. G4 & Friends peaked in UK weekly charts at #6, in Iris weekly charts at #21, and in Scottish weekly charts at #8. While not as successful as their first album, it was still certified platinum. Their version of "When a Child is Born", also from the album, was in the running to become christmas number one for 2005.

In 2005, G4 also launched both the Wonder Mum competition – posing for a photoshoot with each of their own mothers - and the similarly named G Force ride at Drayton Manor Theme Park, and presented a show on Classic FM which showcased their favourite pieces of classical music, along with their own recordings.

=== 2006: Act Three ===
G4's third album Act Three was released on 27 November 2006. Being released in the same week as the third album by the similar band Il Divo, Act Three peaked at #21 in the UK charts with first week sales of 37,487. The album included a collaboration with Stephen Gately on the track "No Matter What", Gately having sung the lead on the original version of the song with his band Boyzone, and an orchestral arrangement of Gnarls Barkley's "Crazy." Act Three was the last album to feature Stiff's voice singing bass.

During this period, G4 traveled to the SOS Children's Villages in Ghana on behalf of Classic Response, completed the London Marathon, and made a special appearance at the 4th of July party at Winfield House where they sang "The Star-Spangled Banner". Towards the end of the year, embarked on a nationwide cathedral tour.

=== 2007: Disbandment ===
On 5 April 2007, G4 announced on GMTV that they would be splitting after their national tour due to disagreements within the band, with Ansell pursuing a solo career. Tenor Thapa stated: "We did not want to drag on for another couple of years, growing increasingly resentful of each other. We are still friends and we want to stay friends but we won't if we carry on in G4". Ansell also confessed that the group found coping with fame difficult, and being popstars was not the band's lifelong aspiration. They gave their final performance at Romsey on 28 July 2007 before splitting, but briefly reunited when they all performed at Ansell's wedding to Quizmania presenter Debbie King in 2009.

=== 2014–2015: Reunion and G4 Christmas ===
In November 2014, after announcing via Twitter that they would be reuniting, G4 performed at the Barbican Hall with support from Charlotte Jaconelli. Stiff declined, stating that he wished to focus solely on his opera career, but he was replaced by Nick Ashby, making him the third bass to sing with the group. Originally meant to be a one-night-only concert, G4 later confirmed on The Alan Titchmarsh Show that they would be touring the country in 2015. Prior to this, the group's first official live performance was at the Leeds Christmas Lights Switch-On alongside former X Factor winner Sam Bailey.

In June 2015, G4 announced that they would be releasing their fourth album G4 Christmas via PledgeMusic. This was followed by "Christmas by Candlelight" Tour of eight dates around the UK in Cathedrals and Churches.

=== 2016–2017: Back for Good Tour, G4 Love Songs and Christmas By Candlelight 2016 ===
On 6 September 2016, G4 announced another PledgeMusic campaign to fund their fifth studio album G4 Love Songs including appearances from Merrill Osmond and Lesley Garrett and the orchestration of the City Of Prague Symphony Orchestra.

On 3 February 2017, G4 released their fifth album, G4 Love Songs. The album launch was held at The Century Club in Soho London, with guest Merrill Osmond. Whilst promoting the album and staying overnight in Birmingham, Ansell and Christie were mugged while cutting through a park.

=== 2018 ===
On 19 July, low tenor Thapa announced on Twitter that he was leaving the group with immediate effect to concentrate on his opera career. G4 announced on social media after a nationwide search that Lewis Raines would be replacing Thapa.

Since that announcement the King's Singers have posted that Nick Ashby would be joining them from 2019.

== Solo careers ==
During the split, Ansell's solo album Tenor at the Movies reached number 1 on the classical chart, making him the youngest tenor to accomplish this feat. In 2012 he was criticised for auditioning for Superstar after it was revealed he was still rehearsing for another musical. Thapa worked with the National Chamber Choir in Dublin before moving back to London, and was in the Scottish Opera's production of Kátya Kabanová. Christie is now a classical composer, having written the opera The Miller's Wife which was shown at the Arcola Theatre in 2013, and Stiff, who returned to Classic FM to present his self-titled music programme has performed in several operas, and has spoken of becoming a lecturer in future.

== Members ==
=== Current ===
- Jonathan Ansell (2004–present) – high tenor/lead
- Mike Christie (2004–present) – baritone
- Duncan Sandilands (2019–present) – bass
- Michael Conway (2025-present) - high tenor

=== Former ===
- Matthew Stiff (2004–2007) – bass
- Ben Thapa (2004–2018, died 2024) – low tenor
- Nick Ashby (2014–2019) – bass
- Lewis Raines (2018–2023) – low tenor
- Jai McDowall (2023–2025) – low tenor

== Discography ==
=== Albums ===
Year	Album details	Chart peak positions			Certifications
Year	Album details	UK	IRE	SCO	Certifications
2005	G4: Released: 28 February 2005; Genre: Popera; Label: Sony BMG; Format: CD, digital download	1	4	1	UK: 2× Platinum
2005	G4 & Friends: Released: 28 November 2005; Genre: Popera; Label: Sony BMG; Format: CD, digital download	6	—	8	UK: Platinum
2006	Act Three: Released: 27 November 2006; Genre: Popera; Label: Sony BMG; Format: CD, digital download	21	50	23	UK: Gold
2015	G4 Christmas: Released: 16 November 2015; Genre: Popera; Label: Amick Productions; Format: CD, digital download	—	—	—	
2017	G4 Love Songs: Released: 3 February 2017; Genre: Popera; Label: Amick Productions; Format: CD, digital download	56	—	67	
2024	G4 20: Released: 12 April 2024; Genre: Popera; Label: Amick Productions; Format: CD, digital download	—	—	60	

=== Singles ===
Year	Single	Chart positions		Album
Year	Single	UK	IRE	Album
2005	"Bohemian Rhapsody"	9	11	G4
2005	"Life on Mars?"	—	—	G4
2005	"First of May"/"When a Child Is Born"	—	—	G4 & Friends
2015	"One Day More" (featuring Charlotte Jaconelli & Rock Choir)	—	—	Non-album single
2017	"All I Ask of You" (featuring Lesley Garrett)	—	—	Non-album single
2017	"Silent Night"	—	—	Non-album single
2017	"When a Child is Born"	—	—	Non-album single
2024	"Io che non vivo senza te (You Don't Have to Say You Love Me)"	—	—	G4 20

=== EPs ===
Year	Title
2005	Happy Mother's Day (The Mother's Day EP)

=== DVDs ===
- Live at the Royal Albert Hall (2005)
- The Reunion – Live in Concert (2015)
- Live in London – Union Chapel (2017)
