= Mike Christie (singer) =

English singer-songwriter (born 1981)

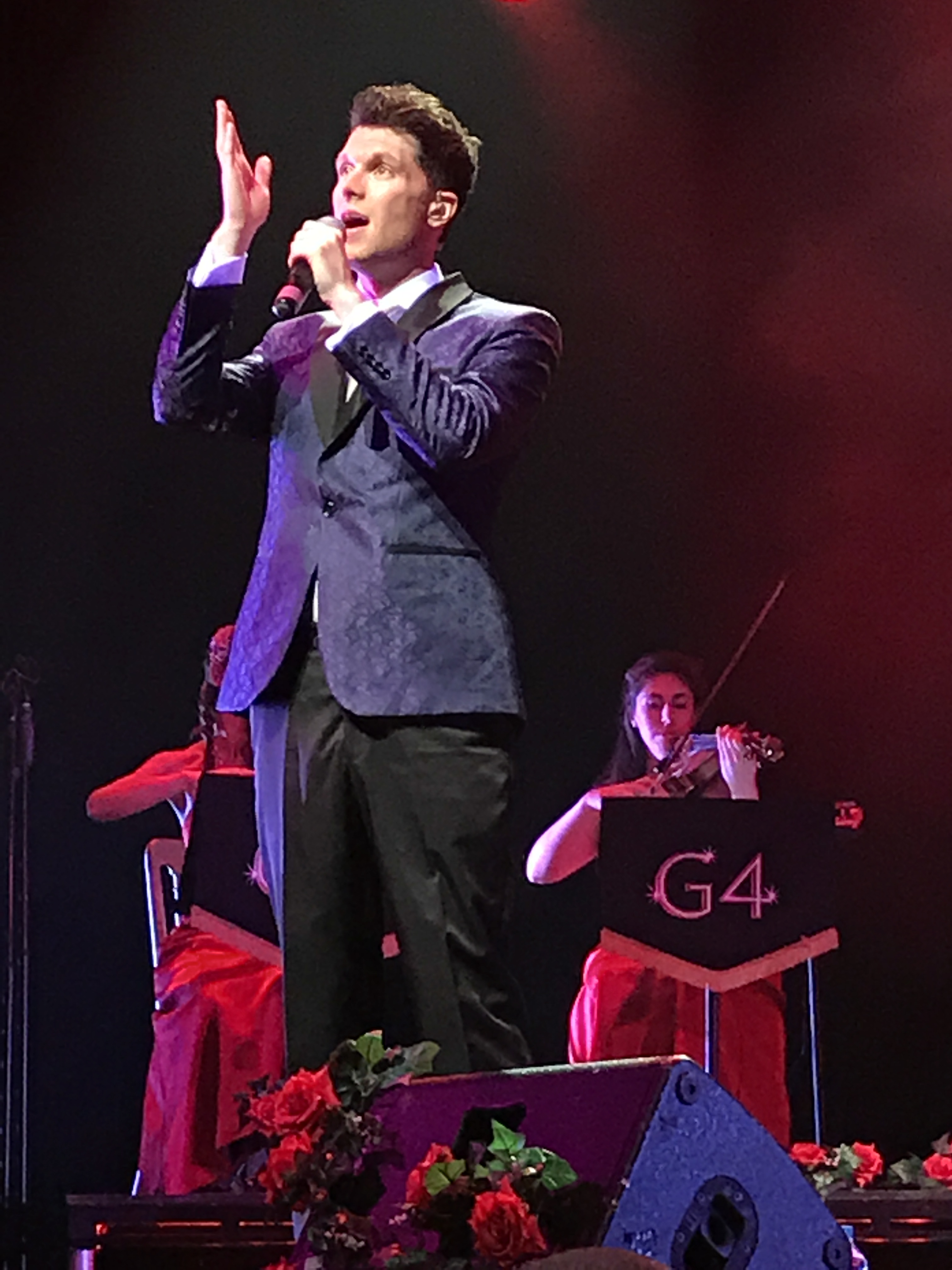
- Mike Christie singing in Weymouth in 2017

Background information
- Born: Michael Philip Christie; 21 April 1981 (age 44); Redhill, Surrey, England
- Genres: Classical; Easy listening Operatic pop Vocal
- Occupations: Singer; composer; songwriter
- Years active: 2004–present
- Label: Amick Productions
- Website: mikechristie.co.uk

Michael Philip Christie (born 21 April 1981) is an English singer-songwriter, composer, and baritone for the music group G4, along with Jonathan Ansell. The operatic harmony group was a finalist on The X Factor in 2004. Christie performs online concerts via CrowdCast.

== Early life ==
Christie was born in Redhill, Surrey. He began singing professionally at the age of eight when he was offered a place as a chorister at Reigate St Mary's Choir School, and in 1993 he moved to Ardingly College where he studied singing under John Dudley and Robert Hammersley. During this period, he appeared in the film Four Weddings and a Funeral as a member of a choir at one of the weddings. He later spent four years at Guildhall School of Music and Drama, graduating in 2004 with Honours in Singing and Piano.

== G4 ==
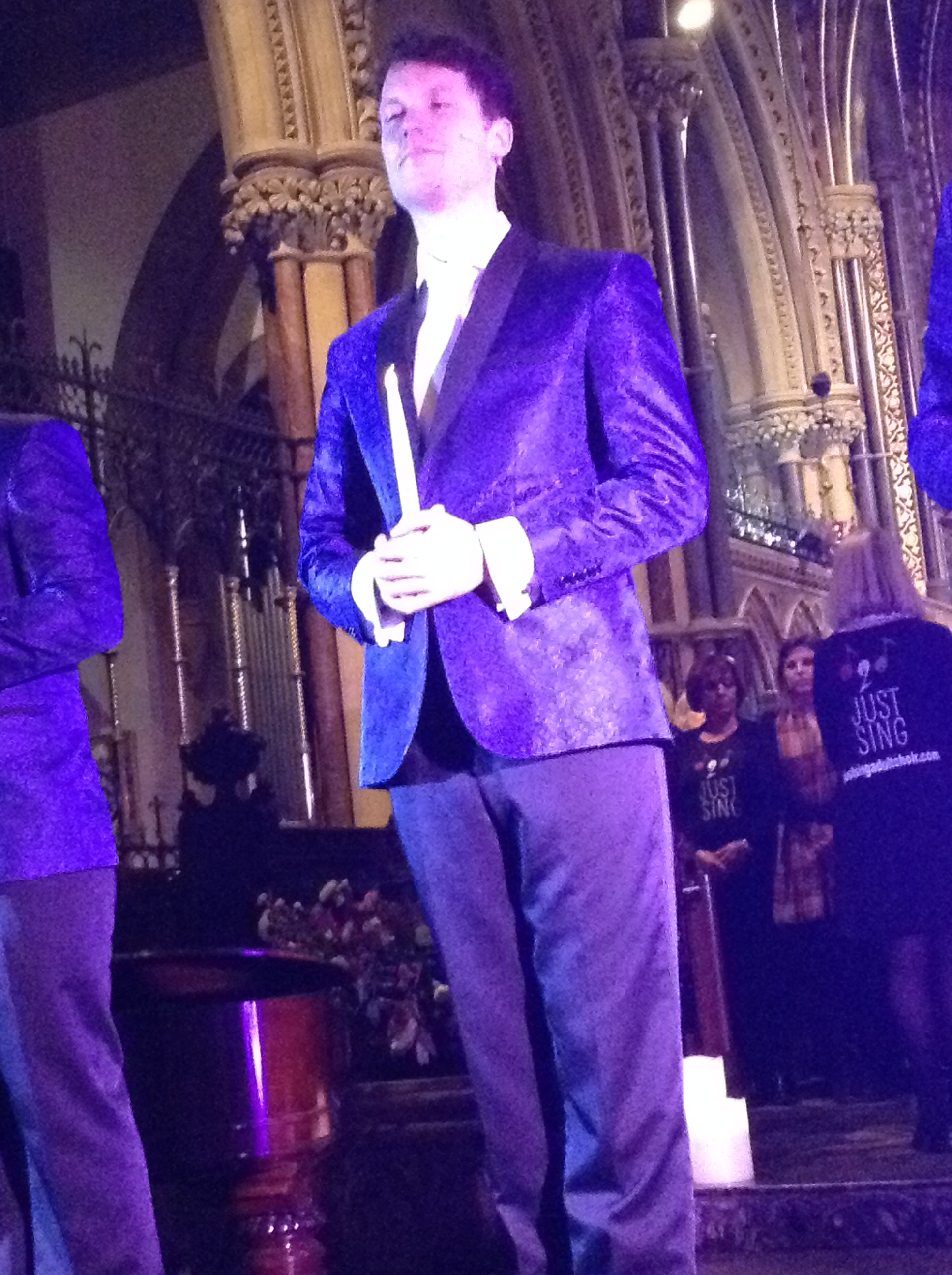
Mike on Tour with G4 in 2016 on the Christmas By Candlelight Tour in Saint Peter's church, Bournemouth

Before graduating, Christie auditioned for The X Factor as a member of G4 with Jonathan Ansell, Matt Stiff, and Ben Thapa, where they placed second behind Steve Brookstein. The group released three albums before their split in 2007. After a seven-year hiatus, G4 reunited for a concert at the Barbican Hall, with Nick Ashby replacing Matt Stiff. The same night, G4 announced they would follow the concert with a Reunion Tour across the UK. Christie has been on a Christmas By Candlelight Tour along with the other members of G4 in 2015, 2016, and 2017. In 2016, G4 went on a Back For Good Tour with special female guest singers Margaret Keys, Katie Marshell, Alessandra Paonessa, and Vox Fortura.

In 2017, G4 released its fifth album Love Songs featuring Merrill Osmond and Lesley Garrett, and went on a 32-date tour around the UK and Ireland.

In 2018, G4 went on a 36-night tour called 'Live in Concert 2018' during March and September.

== Solo career ==
In 2010, Christie released his debut solo album To The Fore which was a departure from classical crossover songs, and included several of his own songs including "Why Not Today". A year later, he was featured in a production of The Glorious Ones, and in 2013, his own opera The Miller's Wife – written entirely in English – was shown at the Arcola theatre.

Christie has been participating in opera at Opera Holland Park in London since 2016 and appeared in Isabeau in the summer of 2018. In 2017, Christie was involved in performances of Verdi's Macbeth, where he played the role of Banquo.

Christie went on a solo tour in October 2017 with songs from his album To The Fore. Christie also announced he was making a new album via PledgeMusic which was released on 5 October 2018 called "10 Years On", which was followed by a 5-date tour, "An Evening with Mike Christie Up Close and Personal." It included songs from the album and guests at venues included Daniel Boys, Mary-Jess Leaverland, and Kyle Thomlinson.

== Other work ==
Christie worked in property development shortly after the G4's split. Since the reformation of G4, Christie has opened his own production company, Amick Productions, which promotes tours of which G4, Vox Fortura, and Mary-Jess Leaverland have been included.

== The Wight Proms ==
Amick Productions staged a four-day outdoor prom on the Isle of Wight in August 2018 at Northwood House. The event featured Blake and Kerry Ellis, as well as other West End stars and local island talent.

== Personal life ==
In 2024, Christie came out as gay. He is married, with two children.
