= Jonathan Ansell =

English singer (born 1982)

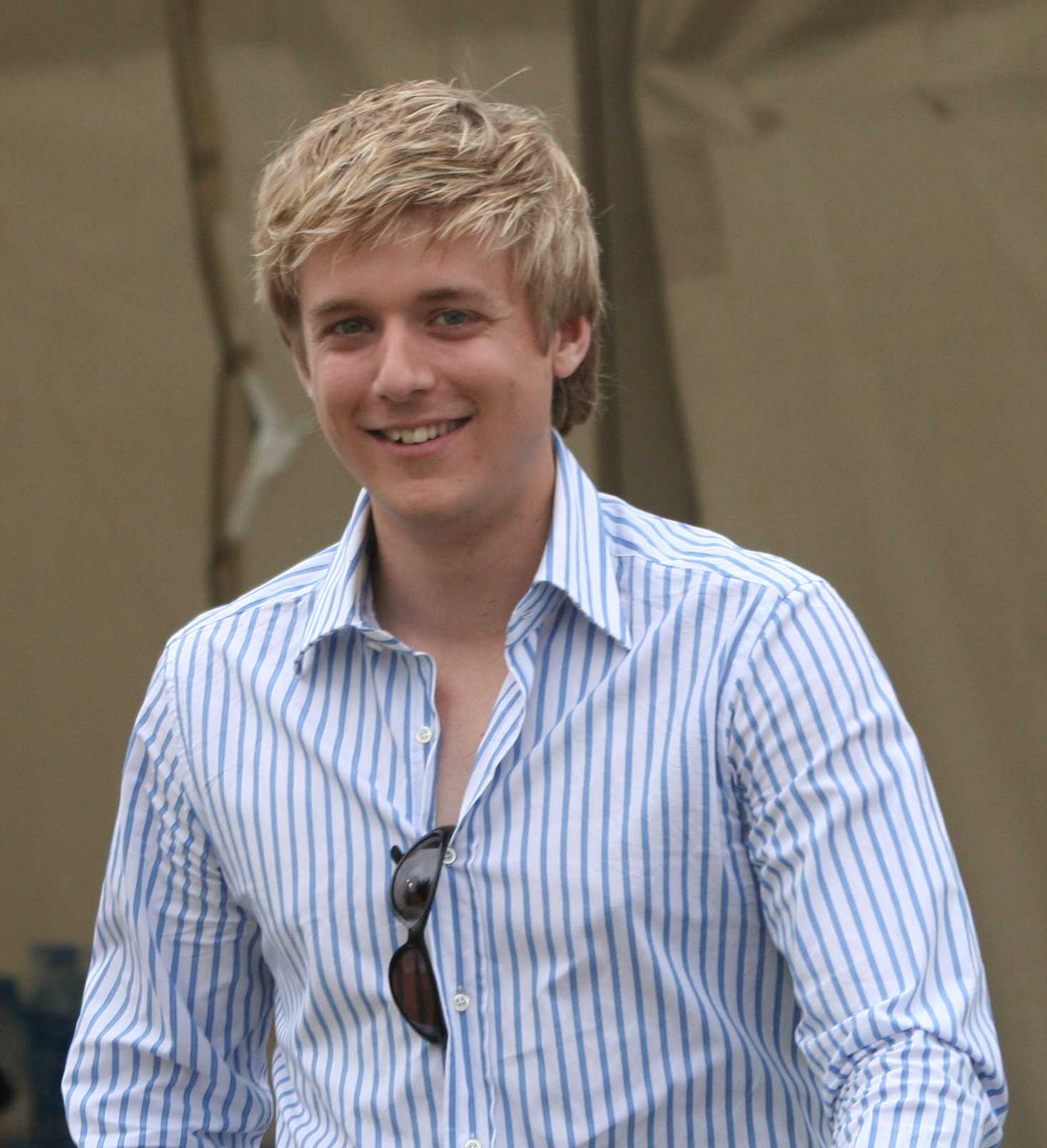
- Ansell in 2007

Background information
- Born: Jonathan Mark Ansell; 10 March 1982 (age 44)
- Origin: Bognor Regis, Sussex, England
- Genres: Classical, easy listening, operatic pop, vocal
- Occupation: Tenor singer
- Years active: 2004–present
- Label: Ansell Entertainment
- Spouse: Debbie King (m. 2009)
- Website: jonathanansell.com

Jonathan Mark Ansell (born 10 March 1982) is an English singer and the high tenor of the vocal group G4.

== Career ==
=== Beginnings ===
Influenced by his mother's tapes of Pavarotti and the Three Tenors, Ansell joined the West Sussex Boys' Choir conducted by Arthur Robson, at the age of eight. He toured extensively with the choir to Florida, Germany, and France, performed in the Royal Festival Hall and sang many times in Arundel Cathedral. Ansell stayed with the choir until his voice broke at the age of 16 when he lost the ability to sing treble but after puberty found he had developed a high tenor voice instead. He attended Bishop Luffa School.

After a performance of Love Changes Everything at a choral society concert in Littlehampton, Ansell's local MP Howard Flight, who was in the audience, arranged for him to have a preliminary audition at the Guildhall School of Music and Drama in London. After working with music teacher Martin Elliott, he won a place at the Guildhall two years later.

While at the Guildhall School, Ansell's singing teacher was Adrian Thompson, who has a similar voice to Ansell and he described their lessons as working together. At that time, Ansell's academic studies fell below the standard. Diagnosed as dyslexic, an agreement was reached where he stayed as a pupil.

=== G4 ===
While at the Guildhall School, Ansell formed the pop-opera boyband G4 with three other students Mike Christie, Tom Lowe, and Ben Thapa. Lowe later resigned as bass, replaced by Matthew Stiff. Their name, G4, stands for Guildhall 4. G4 were discovered after finishing second on ITV talent show The X Factor in 2004. G4's self-titled debut album produced by Trevor Horn and Brian Rawling, reached Number One for Mother's Day weekend 2005. In total they released 3 albums, sold in excess of 1.5 million albums in the UK, completed 5 sell-out UK tours, sold in excess of 40,000 Live at the Royal Albert Hall DVDs (one of the concerts on their first tour) and also released a best-selling autobiography Our Way.

Ansell turned down the role of Prince Tamino in Kenneth Branagh's film of Mozart's The Magic Flute to stay with the band and continue recording. On 5 April 2007, G4 announced on GMTV that they were calling it a day at the end of July 2007. On 17 November 2014, G4 reformed for 'one night only' giving a concert at The Barbican Centre in London to celebrate the 10th Anniversary of their X Factor appearance in 2004. Whilst on stage Jonathan announced that due to the response of their 'one night only' concert they would be doing a UK tour in 2015.

=== Solo venture ===
Ansell signed with new management Jonathan Shalit in 2007 and secured a £1 million, 5-album deal with Universal Classics and Jazz (UCJ), part of Universal Music Group. His first solo album with UCJ, Tenor at the Movies, was released on 18 February 2008. For five Sunday afternoons from 17 February 2008, Ansell presented The Great Movie Composers on ClassicFM coinciding with the release of his solo album. Ansell participated in a celebrity edition of Channel 4 show Come Dine with Me on 10 April 2008 with MC Harvey, Tamara Beckwith and Lynsey de Paul. Ansell came in joint first place with MC Harvey, scoring 21 points. On 8 May 2008, Ansell's participation in BBC programme Ready Steady Cook against Hayley Westenra was broadcast. In the evening of 8 May 2008, Ansell performed Un Giorno Per Noi with Westenra at the Classical Brits, Royal Albert Hall. During June 2008, Ansell and England and Arsenal striker Kelly Smith won the British Lung Foundation's male and female 'Lungs of the Year 2008' award in recognition of the fantastic use they have made of their lungs over the past year.

In a Q&A session with the BBC's Last Choir Standing website, Ansell gave his views on the benefits of being part of a choir: "People see choirs on stage and predominantly it looks quite square... but off stage that's where all the fun happens – in rehearsals, messing about, lunch breaks, interacting with new people. That, for me, is what choirs are all about – having that fun both on and off stage." Jonathan made a guest appearance on Last Choir Standing (Results Show) on 3 August 2008 performing "Barcelona". On Sunday, 17 August 2008, Ansell participated in the tribute concert Lyrics by Don Black which was held at the London Palladium featuring performances of Black's songs by a selection of guest artists. He performed the duet Amigos Para Siempre with Westenra, music by Andrew Lloyd Webber. The evening, hosted by Michael Parkinson, was recorded by BBC Radio 2 Friday Night is Music Night and broadcast on Friday, 22 August 2008. One of the tracks on his second album Forever is "Hearts of England", the 2008 Rugby League World Cup song composed by Patrick Hawes and his brother Andrew. He performed it live at the Rugby League Carnegie Challenge Cup Final at Wembley Stadium, London on Saturday, 30 August 2008.

For the second weekend running Ansell performed a track from his album Forever live at Wembley, this time to sing the football anthem Nessun Dorma at Soccer Aid on Sunday, 7 September while the teams were presented to Geoff Hurst. Before his G4 days, Ansell worked in Jersey with a Gilbert and Sullivan operatic society and during September 2008 returned to his roots, taking on the role of Nanki-Poo in the Carl Rosa Opera Company's production of The Mikado at both the Richmond Theatre and Alexandra Theatre, Birmingham. Ansell performed with Westenra at Music on Fire! at the Royal Military Academy Sandhurst in September 2008, organised by the Army Benevolent Fund to raise funds for veterans.

The third series of The Alan Titchmarsh Show featured the start of a competition to find a soprano to sing with Ansell in the A Night at the Opera tour. 8 ladies were selected to sing in front of a judging panel of David Grant, Ruthie Henshall and Jonathan Shalit. The 4 successful ladies Rosie Bell, Rosie Havel, Olivia Safe and Esther Dee faced a public vote on 15 September 2008 and Olivia Safe and Rosie Bell won through. They sang Libiamo ne' lieti calici with Ansell, from Verdi's La Traviata on 29 September 2008. Olivia Safe won the public vote to appear in the tour of A Night at the Opera.

A Night at the Opera had its first performance at the Cardiff Millennium Centre on 30 October 2008 and toured 18 venues in the UK ending at the London Palladium on 23 November 2008. The show co-starred Silvia Colloca, Telman Guzhevsky, Anna-Clare Monk, Toby Stafford Allen and Olivia Safe. On Saturday, 8 November 2008, Ansell performed "Today Won't Come Again" with Westenra at the Festival of Remembrance at the Royal Albert Hall and later sang Here's to the Heroes when the returning forces came into the auditorium.

During February 2009, Ansell toured with Westenra in The Valentines Tour. At the England versus Scotland Six Nations Rugby Match at Twickenham on 21 March 2009, Ansell sang "God Save the Queen" at Twickenham. During Easter Week, 7 April 2009, Jonathan appeared in Dictionary Corner on Channel 4's Countdown. Ansell was nominated for the Classical Brits 2009 "Album of the Year" with Tenor at the Movies. On Monday 30 November 2009, Ansell launched the This Morning's Christmas Choir. In 2010, Ansell made his musical theatre début as The Man in the Bill Kenwright touring production of Andrew Lloyd Webber and Jim Steinman's Whistle Down The Wind. Opening at the Liverpool Empire on 20 January, Ansell performed eight shows a week during the eight-month UK tour. Ansell played Boemer and two other characters in the 2010 National Tour of Lark Rise to Candleford starting at the Theatre Royal Windsor in September 2010.

In April and May 2011, Ansell played the role of the Prince/Beast in a national tour of Beauty and the Beast.. In June 2011, he toured the UK with the show Jonathan Ansell and Friends. Ansell unsuccessfully auditioned for the lead role in the Andrew Lloyd Webber production of Jesus Christ Superstar in 2012, as part of ITV's Superstar TV talent contest. In January 2012, Ansell launched a new album project, a mix of pop/rock covers and classics. The Album Two Hearts was released on 14 October 2013.

=== Les Musicals ===
Ansell teamed up with Rhydian Roberts on a 32 date tour of his show Les Musicals in May, June and October. Due to the success of the tour it was announced that the duo would be touring another show of 'Les Musicals' in 2019 as well as releasing an album together via PledgeMusic. He joined up with Jai McDowall to complete another tour, and is touring as of 2022.

== Philanthropy ==
Ansell has long been a supporter of Breast Cancer Care because his father's twin sister, Brenda, died from the condition. He participated in the London Triathlon in 2007, performed at their London Fashion Show and Carols by Candlelight Service as well as donating his winnings from Who Wants to be Millionaire and Come Dine with Me. In April 2009, Ansell was appointed as an Ambassador for the charity Breast Cancer Care.

In October 2008, Ansell and Westenra sold poppies at Waterloo station to support the Royal British Legion. On 12 November, Ansell duet "Today Won't Come Again" with Westenra in the Annual Festival of Remembrance. Ansell was the benchmark flyer for the Worthing International Birdman challenge where contestants attempt mechanically unaided flight off the end of Worthing Pier. He managed 16.04 metres (52.6 ft), sporting a Mr Incredible-style pink hairdo.

== Personal life ==
Ansell is married to former Quizmania host Debbie King. The couple has two children: Siena Ansell (born November 2010) and Dexter Sol Ansell (born September 2014).

== Discography ==
=== Albums ===
- Tenor at the Movies
- Forever
- Intimate Sunday
- Two Hearts
