= Ben Thapa =

English opera singer (1982–2024)

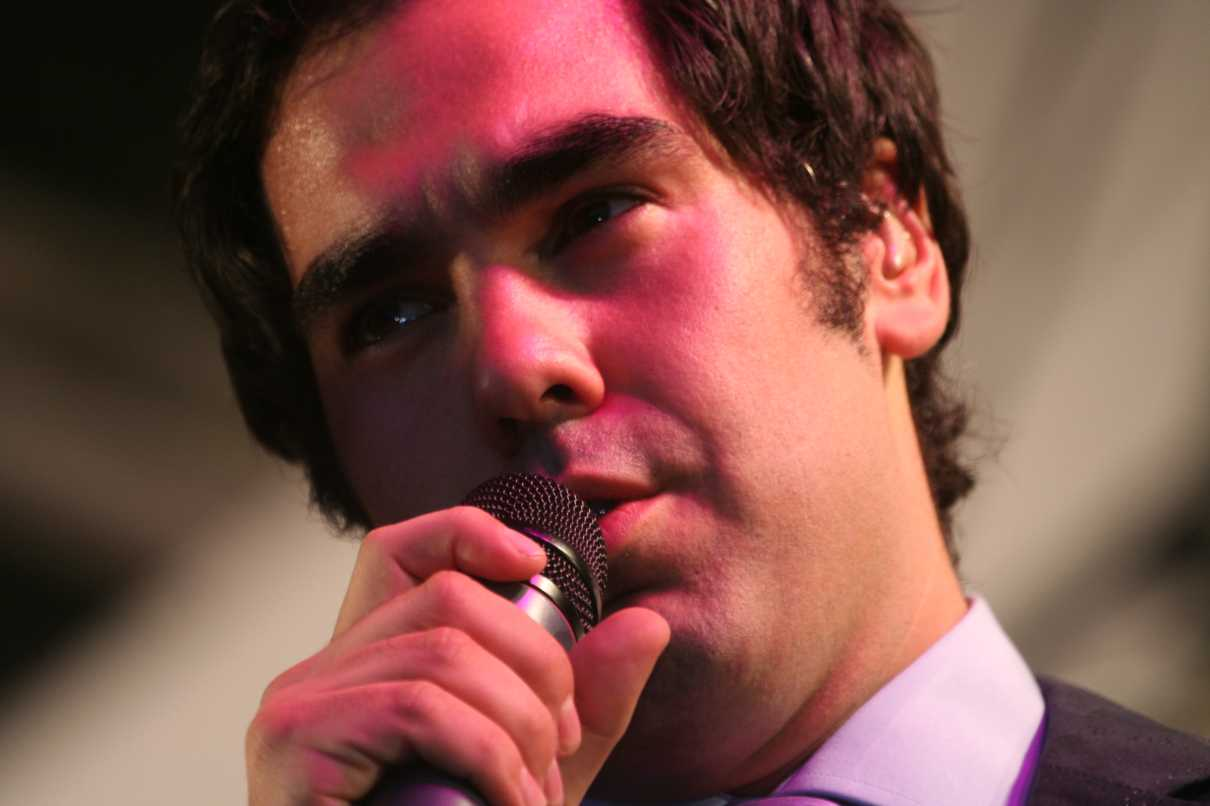
- Thapa in 2007

Background information
- Born: Ben Vishala Thapa; 22 March 1982; Cambridge, Cambridgeshire, England
- Died: 8 September 2024 (aged 42)
- Genres: Classical; easy listening; operatic pop; vocal
- Occupation: Tenor singer
- Years active: 2004–2024

Ben Vishala Thapa (2 March 1982 – 8 September 2024) was an English opera singer, best known as the low tenor in G4 from 2004 to 2018.

== Early life and education ==
Born in Cambridge on 2 March 1982, Thapa was raised by a single mother from the age of four after his father left, and entered foster care when he was eleven. It was during this time Thapa started singing lessons and sang in his local church choir, and played the clarinet in an orchestra while at Hills Road Sixth Form College. He studied at Royal Northern College of Music for a year before transferring to the Guildhall School of Music and Drama where he graduated from in 2004. Thapa graduated from the Wales International Academy of Voice in 2013.

== Career ==
While completing his course at Guildhall, Thapa auditioned for the first series of The X Factor with his G4 bandmates Jon Ansell, Matt Stiff, and Mike Christie where they reached the final but lost out to Steve Brookstein. Due to their popularity on the show they were soon approached by Sony BMG, and the group released three albums. Thapa had perfect pitch, which ensured the group remained in tune during a capella performances. The group split in 2007 but reunited after a seven-year hiatus for a concert at the Barbican Hall, and announced their 2015 reunion tour. Thapa continued touring and recording with G4 until 2018, when he left G4 to concentrate on his solo opera career. He sang in numerous opera productions, including the Scottish Opera's Kátya Kabanová, Teatru Manoel's La Clemenza di Tito, the Birmingham Opera's Mittwoch aus Licht, Idomeneo at the Buxton Festival and Tristan und Isolde at the Longborough Festival Opera. Thapa worked with the National Chamber Choir of Ireland, released the album Songs of My Childhood, and embarked on a nationwide tour. He was also a lay clerk for several years at St George's Cathedral, Southwark.

== Death ==
Thapa died on 8 September 2024, at the age of 42 due to kidney failure. Prior to his death, Thapa revealed that he had undergone an emergency nephrostomy and was on dialysis. G4 issued a statement, saying, "Words cannot express how we all feel right now. We understand that this will be heartbreaking news for so many others too and we send you our love and support as we all remember the amazing man and memories that he has left behind. Ben has been such a major part of the international singing community and he was a critical part of our journey as a group. Thank you for your love at this difficult time. RIP Ben."
