= Crazy (Gnarls Barkley song) =

2006 single by Gnarls Barkley

Single by Gnarls Barkley

from the album St. Elsewhere
- B-side: "Just a Thought"; "Go-Go Gadget Gospel"; "The Boogie Monster"
- Released: 13 March 2006
- Genre: Neo soul; psychedelic soul; electronica; funk; R&B; alternative R&B; pop
- Length: 2:58
- Label: Downtown (US); Warner (worldwide)
- Songwriters: Brian Burton; Thomas Callaway; Gian Franco Reverberi; Gian Piero Reverberi
- Producer: Danger Mouse

Gnarls Barkley singles chronology
"Crazy" (2006)	"Smiley Faces" (2006)

Audio sample
- file; help

Music video
- "Crazy" on YouTube

"Crazy" is the debut single of American soul duo Gnarls Barkley, taken from their debut studio album, St. Elsewhere (2006). It peaked at number two on the Billboard Hot 100 and topped the charts in the United Kingdom, Canada, Ireland, New Zealand, and several other countries.

The song was leaked in late 2005, months before its regular release: it received airplay on BBC Radio 1 in the United Kingdom, and radio DJ Zane Lowe also used the song in television commercials for his show. When it was officially released in March 2006, it became the first single to top the UK Singles Chart on download sales alone. The song remained at the top of the British charts for nine weeks, the longest number-one spell for more than ten years. The band and their record company then decided to remove the physical single from music stores in the country (while keeping the download available) so people would "remember the song fondly and not get sick of it". In spite of this deletion, the song was the best-selling single of 2006 in the UK. Due to continued download sales, it reached one million copies in January 2011. In December 2006, it was nominated for the United Kingdom's Record of the Year but lost to "Patience" by Take That.

The song won a Grammy Award for Best Urban/Alternative Performance in 2007 and was also nominated for Record of the Year, which it lost to "Not Ready to Make Nice" by Dixie Chicks. It was also nominated and further won a 2006 MTV Europe Music Award for Best Song. The song was also named the best song of 2006 by Rolling Stone and by The Village Voice's annual Pazz & Jop critics poll. The song was listed at number 11 on Pitchfork Media's top 500 songs of the 2000s. In 2010, it was placed at number 100 in the "updated" version of Rolling Stone's list of "The 500 Greatest Songs of All Time" and ranked at the top position of Rolling Stone's top 100 songs of the decade (2000–2009). "Crazy" was performed at the 2006 MTV Movie Awards, with Danger Mouse and Green dressed as various Star Wars characters.

== Background ==
The song was picked up by Downtown Records. Danger Mouse's manager sent the song to Downtown's A&R Josh Deutsch because they were looking for an independent label with the same resources as a major. According to an interview with Deutsch in HitQuarters, he heard the song and signed it after a single listen. He said:

"Once in a while you hear a record that is obviously so important on so many levels. The beauty of my position is that it's very direct. If I find something I like there's no bureaucratic process associated with signing it."

By the time the record was signed to Downtown, there was already a huge swell of anticipation, in part due to the established reputation of the two artists but even more as a result of the demo being played on BBC Radio 1 and sparking a profound online awareness; in December 2005, Pitchfork ranked the white-label release of "Crazy" at number 36 on their Top 50 Singles of 2005 list. The record began to break even before the deals with Downtown Records were complete. On its release, "Crazy" became the most downloaded song in the history of the UK music business, going to number one in the strength of downloads alone.

== Composition and inspiration ==
Musically, "Crazy" was inspired by film scores of Spaghetti Westerns, in particular by the works of Ennio Morricone, and the song "Last Men Standing" by Gian Piero Reverberi and Gian Franco Reverberi from the 1968 Spaghetti Western Django, Prepare a Coffin, an unofficial prequel to Django. "Crazy" samples the song, and also utilizes parts of the main melody and chord structure. Because of this, the Reverberis are credited as songwriters along with CeeLo Green and Danger Mouse.

The lyrics for the song developed out of a conversation between Danger Mouse and Green. According to Danger Mouse, "I somehow got off on this tangent about how people won't take an artist seriously unless they're insane... So we started jokingly discussing ways in which we could make people think we were crazy... CeeLo took that conversation and made it into 'Crazy', which we recorded in one take."

== Reception ==
=== Critical response ===
Upon release, "Crazy" received widespread acclaim from music critics. The song was ranked at number one on Rolling Stone's 2009 list of the 100 Best Songs of the Decade. They also placed it at number 100 in the list of the 500 Greatest Songs of All Time, but was dropped to number 307 in its 2021 list. In October 2011, NME placed it at number 32 on its list "150 Best Tracks of the Past 15 Years". In 2007, "Crazy" was named the best single of 2006 by The Village Voice's Pazz & Jop annual year-end critics' poll. NME also placed the song at number 475 on their list of the 500 Greatest Songs of All Time.

=== Chart performance ===
A Star Wars-themed performance of the song at the 2006 MTV Movie Awards.

In the United Kingdom, following its release as a digital download on March 13, 2006, the song debuted at the number-one spot on the UK Download Chart on March 22, 2006. At the time, chart rules allowed a song to appear in the UK Singles Chart based on their download sales if a physical equivalent was to be released the following week. "Crazy" became the first number-one single in the United Kingdom based on download sales alone (more than 31,000 that week), on April 2, 2006―for the week ending date April 8, 2006―with the CD single being released one day later. It remained on top of the chart for nine weeks and on top of the download chart for a record 11 weeks, until the single was pulled from British stores by the band and their record label on May 29, 2006, after nine consecutive weeks at number one, so people will "remember the song fondly and not get sick of it". The last song to spend such a long time at number one in the UK was "Love Is All Around" by Wet Wet Wet in 1994, which was number one for 15 weeks.

"Crazy"'s eleven weeks at the top of the UK Download Chart were the longest stay on that chart that any song had achieved as of 2006. Despite its official removal, record shops had enough stock remaining to sell 19,827 physical copies; along with download sales, this kept the song at number two in the chart week ending date June 10, 2006. The following week, "Crazy" was at number five, before disappearing completely from the chart a week later, as under chart rules a physically deleted single could not remain on the chart longer than two weeks after deletion date. Thus, "Crazy" made history at both ends of its chart run. It marked the most rapid exit from the British chart ever for a former number one, and number five was the highest position at which a single has ever spent its final week on the chart until Alex Day's "Forever Yours" fell out from number four. In the first week of 2007, "Crazy" recharted at number 30, based purely on downloads. The chart rules had been changed yet again, allowing any sold song to chart, irrespective of whether or not it was still on sale in stores. Due to continued download sales, the single became a million-seller in January 2011. It was the 104th single to do this.

During its long stay in the British charts, the single also entered multiple other single charts throughout Europe, including the German, the Swedish, the Austrian and the Irish Singles Charts, and the Dutch Top 40, resulting in a number one position on the European Hot 100 Singles. "Crazy" also performed strongly outside Europe, with top-five positions on the New Zealand and Australian Single Charts, and was also certified gold in both countries. On May 29, 2006, the single went down in New Zealand music history by becoming the 500th number-one single in New Zealand since the official top 40 chart was started in 1973. The Discount Rhinos Full Control remix of the track also featured in the top 20 of the Australian ARIA Club chart. When the album St. Elsewhere was released in the United States on May 9, 2006, the song had debuted at number 91 on the Billboard Hot 100. The song reached the top 40 on May 23, 2006. In mid-2006, "Crazy" spent seven consecutive weeks in the number-two spot. It became the year's first single to peak at number two and never reach number one. The song also charted well on other charts, hitting number seven on the US Modern Rock chart and number 53 on the Hot R&B/Hip-Hop Tracks. It was certified eight-times Platinum by RIAA. Throughout 2006, it sold 1,629,467 digital copies. As of June 2013, the song has sold 3,401,000 downloads copies in the United States.

== Music videos ==
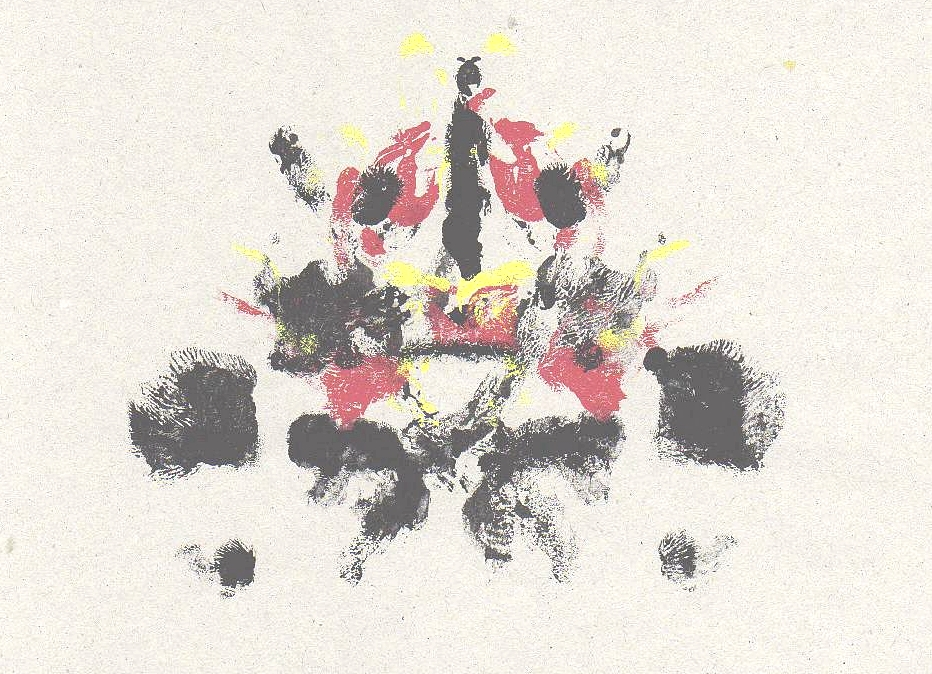
Rorschach style inkblots such as this one made up the central motif for the visuals.

There are two different music videos for this song.

Going along with the psychiatric theme of the song, Gnarls Barkley's music video for "Crazy" is done in the style of the Rorschach test. Animated, mirrored inkblots morph one into another, while taking on ambiguous shapes. Both Cee-Lo and Danger Mouse appear in the shapes, as do the duo's gunshot/heart logo, "Satan", a cranium and various animals, including centipedes, birds, bats, spiders, and insects.

The music video for "Crazy" was directed by Robert Hales, who had previously directed music videos for Jet, Nine Inch Nails and Richard Ashcroft, among others. The inkblot illustrations were produced by motion design studio Blind, Inc., led by creative director and animation director, Vanessa Marzaroli.

The video was nominated for three 2006 MTV Video Music Awards: Best Group Video, Best Direction, and Best Editing, and won the latter two. It was also nominated for a 2006 MTV Europe Music Award for Best Video, but lost to "We Are Your Friends" by Justice vs. Simian.

Before the final music video was finished, the band's UK label released a different video to media outlets such as the BBC. This early promo, directed by Mina Song, is also completely animated and features several symbols from many cultures and religions that appear in a disjointed harmony to the lyrics. Lyrics of the song, and again the band's gunshot/heart logo also appear prominently. The video also includes elements of the single's cover art.

== Use in media ==
"Crazy" was used in several films and TV shows including Kick-Ass, I Think I Love My Wife, Religulous, The Big Short, Cold Case, How to Rock, Grey's Anatomy, Medium, Boyhood, and It's Always Sunny in Philadelphia. A slower remix of the song was used in the trailer for the 2014 film Birdman while the original version was used for the film's TV spots.

== Charts ==
=== Weekly charts ===
Chart (2006–2007)	Peak position
Australia (ARIA)	2
Australian Dance (ARIA)	1
Austria (Ö3 Austria Top 40)	1
Belgium (Ultratop 50 Flanders)	3
Belgium (Ultratop 50 Wallonia)	1
Canada Digital Song Sales (Billboard)	1
Canada All-Format Airplay (Billboard)	1
Canada AC (Billboard)	3
Canada CHR/Pop Top 40 (Radio & Records)	2
Canada CHR/Top 40 (Billboard)	4
Canada Hot AC Top 40 (Radio & Records)	1
Canada Hot AC (Billboard)	1
Canada Rock Top 30 (Radio & Records)	27
Canada Rock (Billboard)	23
Croatia (HRT)	5
Czech Republic Airplay (ČNS IFPI)	21
Denmark (Tracklisten)	1
Europe (Eurochart Hot 100)	1
Finland (Suomen virallinen lista)	3
France (SNEP)	3
Germany (GfK)	3
Greece (IFPI Greece)	8
Hungary (Dance Top 40)	1
Hungary (Rádiós Top 40)	1
Hungary (Single Top 40)	1
Ireland (IRMA)	1
Italy (FIMI)	2
Latvia (Latvian Airplay Top 50)	8
Netherlands (Dutch Top 40)	3
Netherlands (Single Top 100)	3
New Zealand (Recorded Music NZ)	1
Norway (VG-lista)	2
Russia Airplay (TopHit)	38
Scottish Singles Sales (Official Charts)	1
Slovakia Airplay (ČNS IFPI)	27
Sweden (Sverigetopplistan)	4
Switzerland (Schweizer Hitparade)	1
UK Singles (Official Charts)	1
US Billboard Hot 100	2
US Adult Alternative Airplay (Billboard)	1
US Adult Contemporary (Billboard)	7
US Adult Pop Airplay (Billboard)	1
US Alternative Airplay (Billboard)	7
US Dance Club Songs (Billboard)	23
US Hot R&B/Hip-Hop Songs (Billboard)	53
US Pop Airplay (Billboard)	6
US Rhythmic Airplay (Billboard)	16
US Smooth Jazz Airplay (Billboard)	27

Chart (2017)	Peak position
Poland Airplay (ZPAV)	61

Chart (2023)	Peak position
South Korea (Circle)	153

=== Year-end charts ===
Chart (2006)	Position
Australia (ARIA)	16
Austria (Ö3 Austria Top 40)	1
Belgium (Ultratop 50 Flanders)	6
Belgium (Ultratop 50 Wallonia)	7
Brazil (Crowley)	59
Europe (Eurochart Hot 100)	3
France (SNEP)	28
Germany (Media Control GfK)	4
Hungary (Dance Top 40)	19
Hungary (Rádiós Top 40)	22
Ireland (IRMA)	5
Italy (FIMI)	5
Netherlands (Dutch Top 40)	4
Netherlands (Single Top 100)	6
New Zealand (RIANZ)	1
Russia Airplay (TopHit)	124
Sweden (Hitlistan)	15
Switzerland (Schweizer Hitparade)	2
UK Singles (OCC)	1
US Billboard Hot 100	7
US Adult Contemporary (Billboard)	23
US Adult Top 40 (Billboard)	11

Chart (2007)	Position
UK Singles (OCC)	170
US Adult Contemporary (Billboard)	28

=== Decade-end charts ===
Chart (2000–2009)	Position
Austria (Ö3 Austria Top 40)	39
Germany (Media Control GfK)	20
Netherlands (Single Top 100)	87
UK Singles (OCC)	12

== Certifications ==
Region	Certification	Certified units/sales
Australia (ARIA)	Gold	35,000^{^}
Austria (IFPI Austria)	Gold	15,000^{*}
Belgium (BRMA)	Gold	25,000^{*}
Canada (Music Canada) Ringtone	2× Platinum	80,000^{*}
Denmark (IFPI Danmark)	2× Platinum	16,000^{^}
Germany (BVMI)	3× Gold	900,000^{‡}
Italy (FIMI)	Platinum	50,000^{‡}
New Zealand (RMNZ)	6× Platinum	180,000^{‡}
Sweden (GLF)	Platinum	20,000^{^}
Switzerland (IFPI Switzerland)	Gold	15,000^{^}
United Kingdom (BPI)	4× Platinum	2,400,000^{‡}
United States (RIAA)	8× Platinum	8,000,000^{‡}
United States (RIAA) Mastertone	Platinum	1,000,000^{*}
^{*} Sales figures based on certification alone.^{^} Shipments figures based on certification alone.^{‡} Sales+streaming figures based on certification alone.

== Release history ==
Release dates and formats for "Crazy"
Region	Date	Format	Label(s)	Ref.
United States	13 June 2006	Contemporary hit radio	Lava	
United States	11 July 2006	Rhythmic contemporary radio	Lava	

== Cover versions ==
=== Violent Femmes cover ===
"Crazy"

Single by Violent Femmes
- Released: June 24, 2008 (iTunes)
- Genre: Alternative rock
- Length: 3:28
- Label: The Secret Life of Records; IODA
- Songwriters: Brian Burton; Thomas Callaway; Gian Franco Reverberi; Gian Piero Reverberi
- Producer: Violent Femmes

Violent Femmes singles chronology
"All I Want" (2000)	"Crazy" (2008)

Violent Femmes released a cover of the song on June 24, 2008, through the iTunes Store and on a limited edition, baby blue 12" vinyl. It was their first newly recorded song since 2000. Gnarls Barkley had previously covered the Violent Femmes song "Gone Daddy Gone" on their album St. Elsewhere.

Gnarls Barkley described the Violent Femmes' version as: "I might compare it to a calm pond. I caught my reflection in it. And I seemed to be momentarily at peace. This track sounds entirely different in the rain, and supports some intriguing lilypads." The Violent Femmes hosted a YouTube contest beginning on June 10, 2008, with a cash award of one thousand dollars and "other cool prizes" for creating and submitting a promotional video clip.

==== Violent Femmes track listing ====
1. "Crazy" – 3:28
2. "Crazy (instrumental)" – 3:30
3. "Crazy (a capella)" – 3:04

=== Other covers and remixes ===
The Kooks, Nelly Furtado, and The Zutons have covered "Crazy" on BBC Radio 1's Live Lounge. The Kooks' version was released on Radio 1's Live Lounge, while Furtado's version was released as a B-side on her UK single "Promiscuous" and she performed the song live with Welsh singer Charlotte Church on The Charlotte Church Show. Folk singer Ray LaMontagne has also covered the song, a version very well received by critics and Paris Hilton had delayed the release of her debut album Paris to include a cover of "Crazy" as well, although it was not included in the final track list. G4 also included an operatic cover of "Crazy" on the album Act Three. Other artists, including Maroon 5, Ninet Tayeb, The Raconteurs, Billy Idol, The Academy Is... (with Travie McCoy of Gym Class Heroes), Butch Walker, Cat Power, Texas, The Twilight Singers, Mates of State, Paco Estrada & One Love, and of Montreal have performed cover versions of the song live in concert. Trey Lorenz (Mariah Carey's backup singer) has also performed the song on Carey's The Adventures of Mimi tour throughout the summer and autumn of 2006. Shawn Colvin performed the song on A Prairie Home Companion on November 4, 2006. On her recent tour, Cat Power performed the song during her set. Singer-songwriter Jude's cover of the song can be found on YouTube. David Gilmour used to play the song during some of his soundchecks for his On an Island tour in 2006. Lil Wayne remixed the song for his 2007 mixtape Da Drought 3. Prince covered the song in his one-off performance at London's KOKO Club on May 10, 2007, and at several of his 21 concerts at London's O2 Arena in August and September 2007. Pink covered "Crazy" during the entire Funhouse Tour (2009). Paolo Nutini frequently covers the song at his concerts. Little Ghost performed a cover of the song for their BBC session in 2014. Australian Idol 2007 contestant Natalie Gauci covered the song during the Doin' It for the Kids special, using her own arrangement. On November 6, 2008, the band OneRepublic covered "Crazy" in front of a hometown crowd at the Fillmore Auditorium in Denver, Colorado. British soul singer Alice Russell included a cover of the song in her 2008 album Pot of Gold. Relient K covered the song for their 2011 cover album, Is for Karaoke. The Neighbourhood performed "Crazy" live during their 2015 tour, The Flood tour. British indie-rock band Nothing But Thieves released their own cover on April 27, 2018. On February 28, 2019 Kacey Musgraves performed "Crazy" live with CeeLo Green during the second Nashville show of the Oh, What a World Tour at the Ryman Auditorium.

Actor Stephen Kramer Glickman also covered the song for his debut album, The Moving Company.

The Ukulele Orchestra of Great Britain covered the song as part of their Ukulele Lockdown series, released on YouTube on April 12, 2020.

At Glastonbury 2014, on the final night, Kasabian covered the song while headlining on the pyramid stage. This was aired on BBC Two at 10:50 pm on June 29, 2014.

Similarly, many unofficial remixes and mashups of the song were released as white label records and are circulating on file sharing networks and MP3 blogs. The Discount Rhinos Full Control remix of the track even reached number 15 of the Australian ARIA Club chart.

Honduran-Canadian singer Daniela Andrade also covered the song. Her version was featured in American TV series Suits and superhero web television series The Umbrella Academy.

== See also ==
- Deletion (music industry)
