= Ronan Parke =

English singer

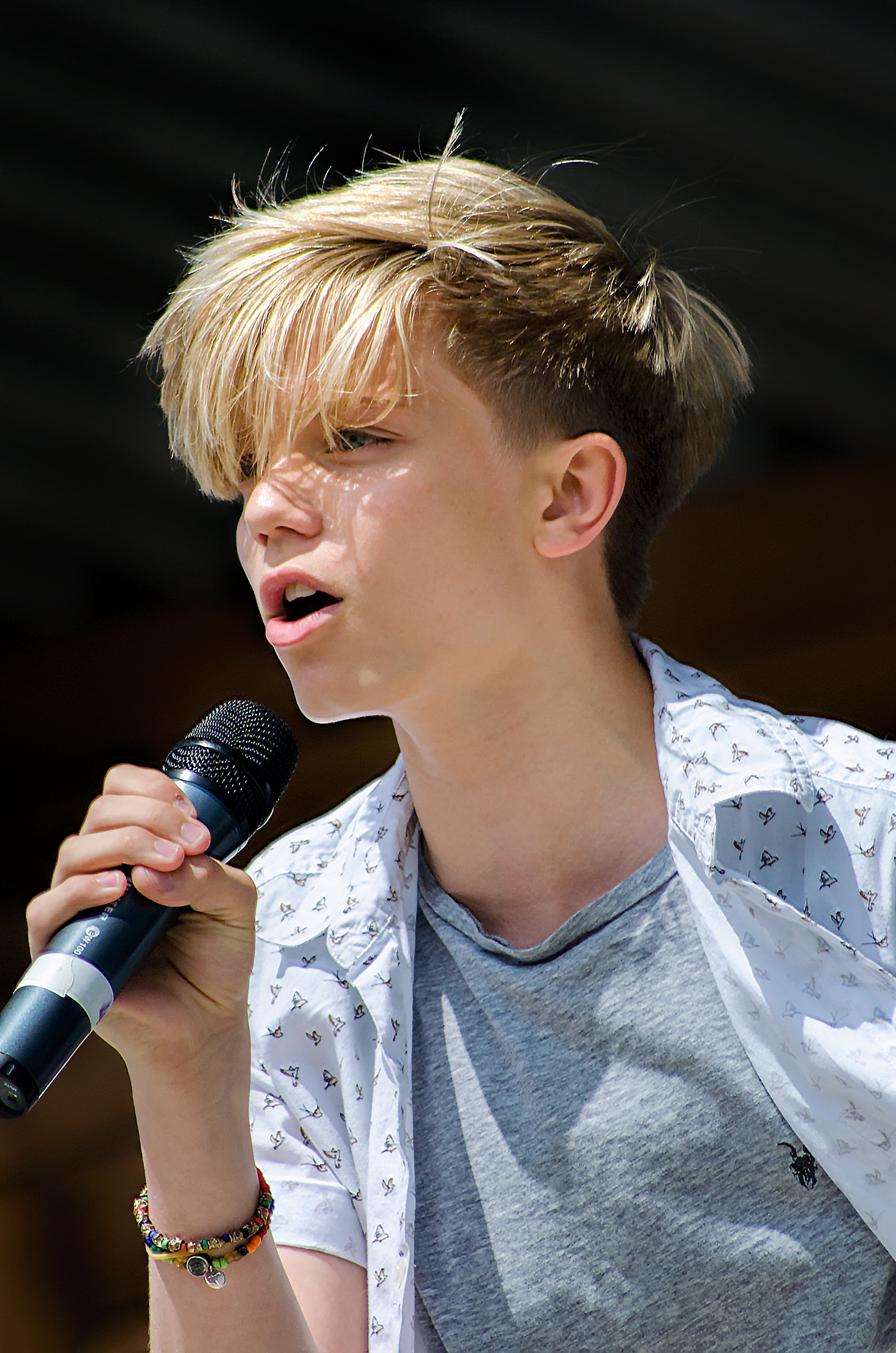
- Ronan Parke at Southmead Festival 2013

Background information
- Born: 8 August 1998 (age 28); Poringland, Norfolk, England
- Origin: Norwich, England
- Genre: Pop
- Occupation: Singer
- Instrument: Vocals
- Years active: 2011–2019
- Labels: Entertainment Management Limited (2017–2019); AD Records (2012–14); Syco, Epic (2011–2012)

Ronan Parke (born 8 August 1998) is an English singer from Poringland, Norfolk, who came runner-up in the fifth series of ITV show Britain's Got Talent in 2011 at the age of 12, despite being the bookies' favourite to win. Since appearing on the show, he had signed a joint record deal with Sony Music and released a charted self-titled debut album Ronan Parke on 24 October 2011 which reached 22 on the Official Chart. He has also released a number of singles, including a Christmas single in 2012 and a charity single "Defined" in 2013 with the anti-bullying organisation Kidscape. In 2018 he released a single titled "No Love (Like First Love)" followed by an original album titled Found My Way and a Christmas single titled "Cheers".

== Early and personal life ==
Ronan Parke was born to Maggie and Trevor Parke in the village of Poringland, Norfolk. His family are close to the family of ex-Norwich City player Bryan Gunn, whose daughter helped Parke submit his application form for Britain's Got Talent. Parke had been taking singing lessons in his home town before getting the confidence to apply for the show.

Parke attended Framingham Earl High School. He is openly gay.

== Career ==
=== 2011: Britain's Got Talent ===
Parke auditioned for Britain's Got Talent in London in front of judges Amanda Holden, Michael McIntyre and Louis Walsh (who was filling in for David Hasselhoff). He performed "Feeling Good" and before the song finished, the entire 2,500-strong audience and three judges gave Parke a standing ovation. He received rave reviews after his performance and received three "yes" votes and advanced to the next round, with Walsh declaring that Parke "is the one to beat." Following the airing of his audition on the third auditions show on 30 April 2011, Parke quickly became the bookies' favourite to win the show. Parke advanced to the semi-finals a few weeks later.

Parke performed for a second time during the semi-final on 30 May 2011, performing "Make You Feel My Love" by Bob Dylan. After his performance, he received praise from all four judges; David Hasselhoff (who was not present at Parke's audition), McIntyre, Holden and Simon Cowell, who was only judging the live finals. Parke received the highest public vote of the night and was automatically sent through to the final.

In the final on 4 June, Parke performed "Because of You" by Kelly Clarkson and received a standing ovation from the audience and judges, who once again gave him praise for his powerful rendition of the song. Louis Walsh, who was in the audience for the final, was referred to by Cowell and also praised Parke saying, "He's made the hairs stand on the back of my neck". However, Parke lost to eventual winner Jai McDowall by a margin of 2.6% of the vote.

=== 2011: Debut album ===
Two days after the final, it was reported that Sony Music were keen to offer Parke a recording contract worth £1 million. The same day, it was also reported that Cowell had hoped for Ronan to duet with Jackie Evancho, although no plans were completed for this to occur.

Parke performed in the Britain's Got Talent Live Tour 2011, making appearances all throughout the UK. The tour opened on 12 June 2011 at Newcastle Metro Radio Arena and finished on 26 June at Bournemouth BIC. During the tour, Parke sang all three of the songs that he performed on the show, collaborating with pianist Paul Gbegbaje for "Make You Feel My Love".

Parke appeared at the Royal Norfolk Show on 30 June to greet fans and sign autographs. Parke also performed at the Hamilton Park Racecourse family night on 9 July, filling in for Joe McElderry, who was forced to pull out. Parke performed for an audience of over 50,000 at T4 on the Beach on 10 July, singing Cee Lo Green's "Forget You". He was introduced onto the stage by David Hasselhoff.

Parke signed to Sony Music and Syco as a joint contract in 2011. The album, Ronan Parke, was released in the UK on 24 October 2011.

On 28 July 2011, Parke uploaded a video to YouTube of him performing an acoustic cover of Lady Gaga's "The Edge of Glory", which attracted media attention. His Facebook page stated that a new video of him singing an acoustic cover would be released every week as part of a three-part series called Ronan Sings. The second video was an acoustic cover of "Make You Feel My Love" by Bob Dylan, which was uploaded on 10 August. Amazon also showed an exclusive video on the pre-order page of Parke's debut album of him performing an acoustic cover of "Forget You". A new video of Parke singing "Jar of Hearts", by Christina Perri, was released on 6 September 2011.

He also announced his first gig in his home county of Norfolk, and performed at Potters Leisure Resort, Hopton-on-Sea, on 22 and 23 October 2011. Parke also performed at Xscape in Castleford, West Yorkshire in August. Parke performed "Forget You", "Ben" and "Smile" at the Michael Jackson tribute show on 28 August 2011 at Blackpool Opera House.

Parke announced on Facebook that "A Thousand Miles", originally by Vanessa Carlton, would be the first single from the album and the music video released on 14 September 2011. The lyric video was posted onto YouTube on 2 September 2011.

=== 2012–2014 ===
On 3 May 2012, according to several reports, Parke was dropped by Epic records and Syco. Parke's official website issued a statement denying he was "dumped", but confirmed that he had "left Sony". On 19 May, his mother, Maggie Parke, revealed that he was collaborating with writers on an EP which was due to be released in the summer. On 6 August, Parke officially released his new single "We Are Shooting Stars". This was followed by four other versions of the song. In December, Parke released a collaborative EP with Britain's Got Talent contestant Luciel Johns. The EP included a brand new single "Not Alone This Christmas", plus a cover from each of the two boys. The EP was released digitally and physically through an independent website.

Parke performed Feeling Good at the CCTV New Year's Gala in Beijing on 31 December 2012. A single titled "Move", was released on iTunes in July 2013 and another single titled "Defined", was released on iTunes in January 2014.

Parke announced via Facebook he was leaving AD Records on 13 March 2014.

=== 2017 ===
On his first theatre experience, Parke played the title role of Aladdin in a pantomime produced by Anton Benson Productions at the Northwich Memorial Court Cheshire along with Vicki Michelle and Charles Lawson from 9 December 2017 to 1 January 2018. Parke was nominated for Best Newcomer by The Great British Pantomime Awards on 11 February 2018.

Parke announced via Twitter in 2017 that he would be represented by Entertainment Management Limited.

=== 2018: New album and Christmas single ===
Parke announced he was working with songwriters around the world on an album of original songs. On 27 July 2018, Parke released a single titled "No Love (Like First Love)" on digital platforms, together with a music video filmed by LiveUP Media that released on 3 August 2018.

He performed "No Love (Like First Love)", Lady Gaga's "The Edge of Glory", Ed Sheeran's "Thinking Out Loud" and Prince's "Purple Rain" at the Sundown Festival in Norwich on 1 September 2018.

On 30 October 2018 Parke announced the title of his album Found My Way to be released on 9 November 2018. The album was first released only on digital platforms, the CD album was released later on 26 November 2018. CelebMix had an exclusive review of the album and labelled it "a triumphant coming of age for the pop-star".

Parke also debut live an original Christmas single titled "Cheers" at the Stockport Christmas lights switch on at Merseyway Shopping Centre on 14 November 2018. The original Christmas single titled "Cheers" was released on 23 November 2018 and the music video release on 3 December 2018.

== Discography ==
=== Studio albums ===
Title	Details	Peak chart positions
Title	Details	UK
Ronan Parke	Release date: 24 October 2011; Label: Syco; Formats: CD, digital download	22
Found My Way	Release date: 9 November 2018; Label: Entertainment Management; Formats: CD, digital download	—

=== EPs ===
Title	Details
No Love (Like First Love)	Release date: 27 July 2018; Label: Entertainment Management; Format: Digital download

=== Singles ===
Year	Single	Album
2011	"A Thousand Miles"	Ronan Parke
2012	"We Are Shooting Stars"	Non-album singles
2012	"Not Alone This Christmas" (feat. Luciel Johns)	Non-album singles
2013	"Move"	Non-album singles
2014	"Defined"	Non-album singles
2018	"No Love (Like First Love)"	Found My Way
2018	"Cheers"	Non-Album Single
