= Matthew Stiff =

English opera singer (born 1979)

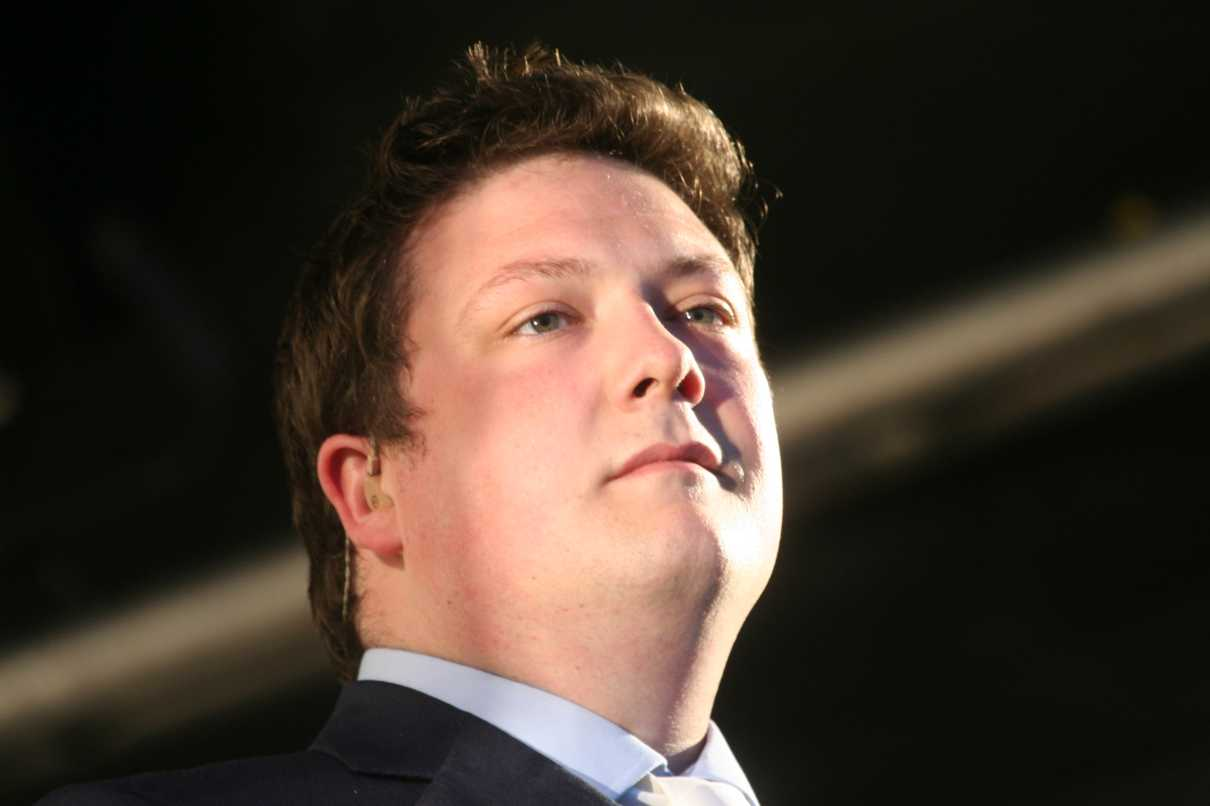
- Stiff in 2007

Background information
- Born: Matthew William Tansley Stiff; 13 December 1979 (age 46); Grimsby, Lincolnshire, England
- Genres: Classical; Opera; Vocal
- Occupation: Bass/baritone singer
- Years active: 2004–present
- Website: https://www.matthewtansleystiff.com/

Matthew William Tansley Stiff (born 13 December 1979), formerly credited as Matt Stiff, is an English opera singer, radio presenter, and former bass singer with classical vocal group G4.

== Early life ==
Stiff began to play the trombone at the age of eight, but later made the transition to singing, after which he attended Franklin College, then studied music at the University of Huddersfield where he gained his BMus (Hons) and MA in Musical Performance. While in Huddersfield, he took singing lessons with vocal coach Paul Wade who described him as "a great pupil".

== G4 ==
As a student at Guildhall where he studied for a Postgraduate diploma in vocal training, Stiff replaced bass singer Tom Lowe to become a member of G4 which also included final year undergraduates Jonathan Ansell, Mike Christie, and Ben Thapa, who all started singing together to raise money and gain experience. In 2004 they later auditioned for the first series of The X Factor and despite placing second, signed a £1.5 million record deal with Sony-BMG. Their first album, titled G4 was released in February 2005 and achieved double-platinum status. They went on to produce two more albums: G4 and Friends and G4 Act Three with combined sales in excess of 1.5 million copies.

In 2007, after three years and three albums, G4 announced their split on GMTV due to disagreements within the band. Lead singer Ansell later admitted that the two of them had rowed the most.

== Post G4 ==
In 2008, following a schedule overhaul at Classic FM, Stiff re-joined the station as a weekend presenter (he had previously hosted another show with the other members of G4), after which he returned to Guildhall in 2009 for a Master of Music Opera course, graduating with a Distinction in 2011. He has since joined a number of opera companies including the British Youth Opera where he played Kecal in The Bartered Bride.
