= Framingham Earl =

Village in Norfolk, England

Coordinates: 52.57488°N 1.35852°E

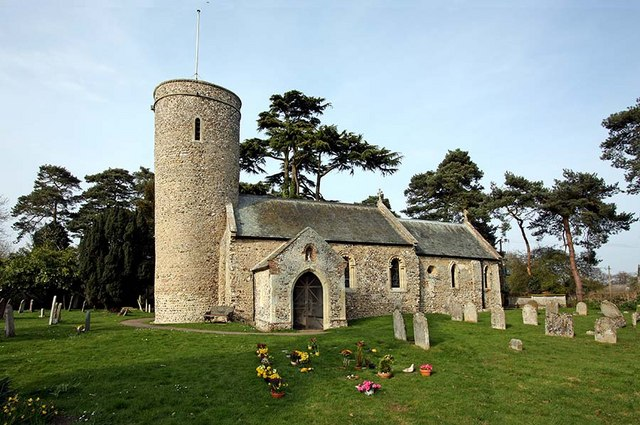
- St. Andrew's Church, Framingham Earl

- Location within Norfolk
- Area: 0.99 sq mi (2.6 km^{2})
- Population: 1,109 (2021 census)
  - Density: 1,120/sq mi (430/km^{2})
- OS grid reference: TG276027
  - London: 96 miles (154 km)
- Civil parish: Framingham Earl
- District: South Norfolk
- Shire county: Norfolk
- Region: East
- Country: England
- Sovereign state: United Kingdom
- Post town: NORWICH
- Postcode district: NR14
- Dialling code: 01508
- Police: Norfolk
- Fire: Norfolk
- Ambulance: East of England
- UK Parliament: South Norfolk

Framingham Earl is a small village and civil parish in the English county of Norfolk.

Framingham Earl is located 5.8 miles (9.3 km) north-west of Loddon and 4.6 miles (7.4 km) south-east of Norwich.

== History ==
Framingham Earl's name is of Anglo-Saxon origin and derives from the Old English for the village or homestead of Fram's people. The addition of "Earl" was due to the fact the village was traditionally part of the estates of the Earl of Norfolk.

Framingham Earl has been identified as the site of possible Roman settlement due to the discovery of coins, pottery, tiles and bricks during an excavation of a new gas pipeline in 1992.

In the Domesday Book of 1086, Framingham Earl is listed alongside Framingham Pigot as a settlement of 61 households in the hundred of Henstead. At the time the villages were divided between the East Anglian estates of King William I, Bishop Odo of Bayeux, Roger Bigod of Norfolk and Godric the Steward.

== Demographics ==
According to the 2021 census, Framingham Earl has a total population of 1,109 people which is an increase from the 871 people listed in the 2011 census.

== Governance ==
Framingham Earl is part of the electoral ward of Poringland, Framinghams & Trowse for local elections and is part of the district of South Norfolk.

The village's national constituency is South Norfolk which has been represented by the Labour Party's Ben Goldsborough since 2024.

== St. Andrew's Church ==
Framingham Earl's parish church is dedicated to Saint Andrew the Apostle and is one of Norfolk's 124 remaining Anglo-Saxon round-tower churches, dating from the 12th Century. St. Andrew's is located on Yelverton Road and has been Grade I listed since 1959. St. Andrew's remains open for church services a few times a month.

The church features surviving medieval stained-glassed window roundels depicting Saint Margaret the Virgin and Saint Catherine of the Wheel.

== Amenities ==
Framingham Earl High School is located within the village and operates as part of the Sapientia Education Trust. The school has a student body of around 800 and was rated as a "Good" school in 2014 by Ofsted, a decision which was upheld in 2022. The school shares its site with a Sports Centre which opened in 2006 and offers exercise classes and sports to the local community. The centre is currently under the management of South Norfolk Council.

== Notable residents ==
- W. G. Sebald (1944–2001), German writer and academic, buried in St. Andrew's Churchyard.

== War memorial ==
Framingham Earl's war memorial is a marble plaque with a carved wooden border, located inside St. Thomas' Church. The memorial lists the following names for the First World War:

Rank	Name	Unit	Date of death	Burial/Commemoration
LCpl.	Henry Meadows	8th Bn., Norfolk Regiment	8 Jul. 1916	Abbeville Cemetery
Pte.	James P. Clare	1st Bn., Essex Regiment	13 Aug. 1915	Helles Memorial
Pte.	Frank N. Watkinson	9th Bn., Norfolk Regiment	18 Jun. 1917	St. Andrew's Churchyard
