= Britain's Got Talent series 5 =

Britain's Got Talent
- Series 5
- Hosted by: Ant & Dec (ITV); Stephen Mulhern (ITV2)
- Judges: David Hasselhoff; Michael McIntyre; Amanda Holden; Simon Cowell (live shows); Louis Walsh (London auditions)
- Winner: Jai McDowall
- Runner-up: Ronan Parke

Release
- Original network: ITV; ITV2 (BGMT)
- Original release: 16 April – 4 June 2011

Series chronology
- ← Previous; Series 4 Next → Series 6

Judges and Presenter(s) for Britain's Got Talent Series 5

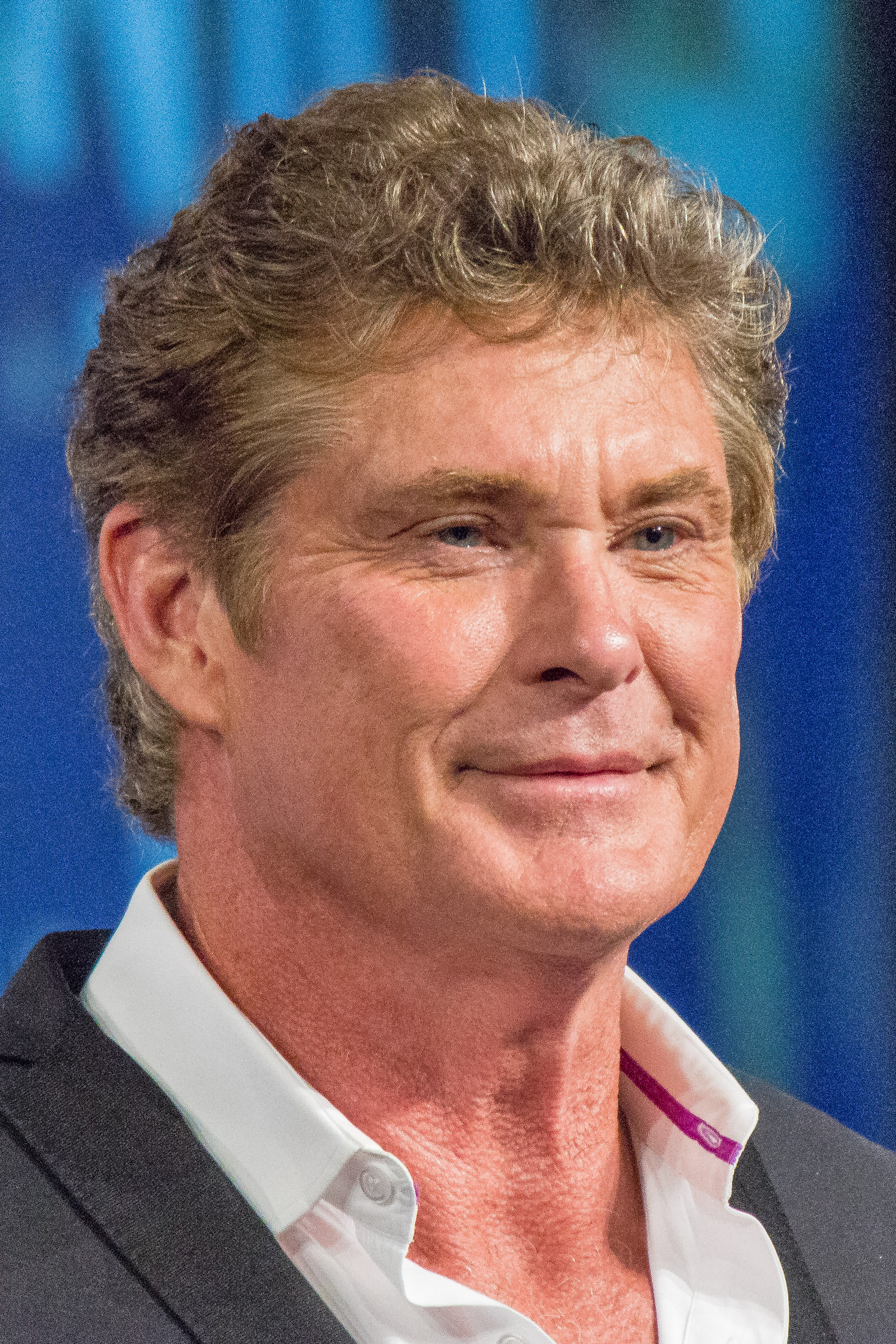
David Hasselhoff

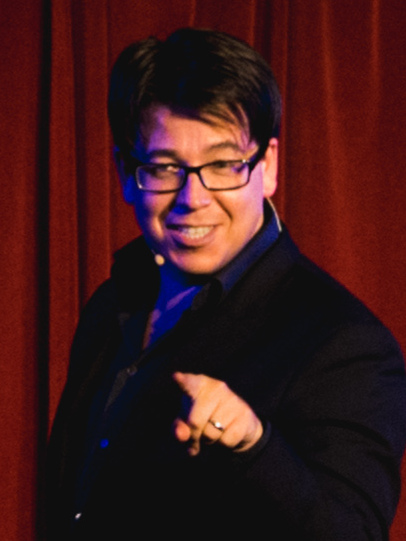
Michael McIntyre

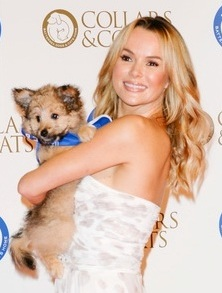
Amanda Holden

Simon Cowell (second half)

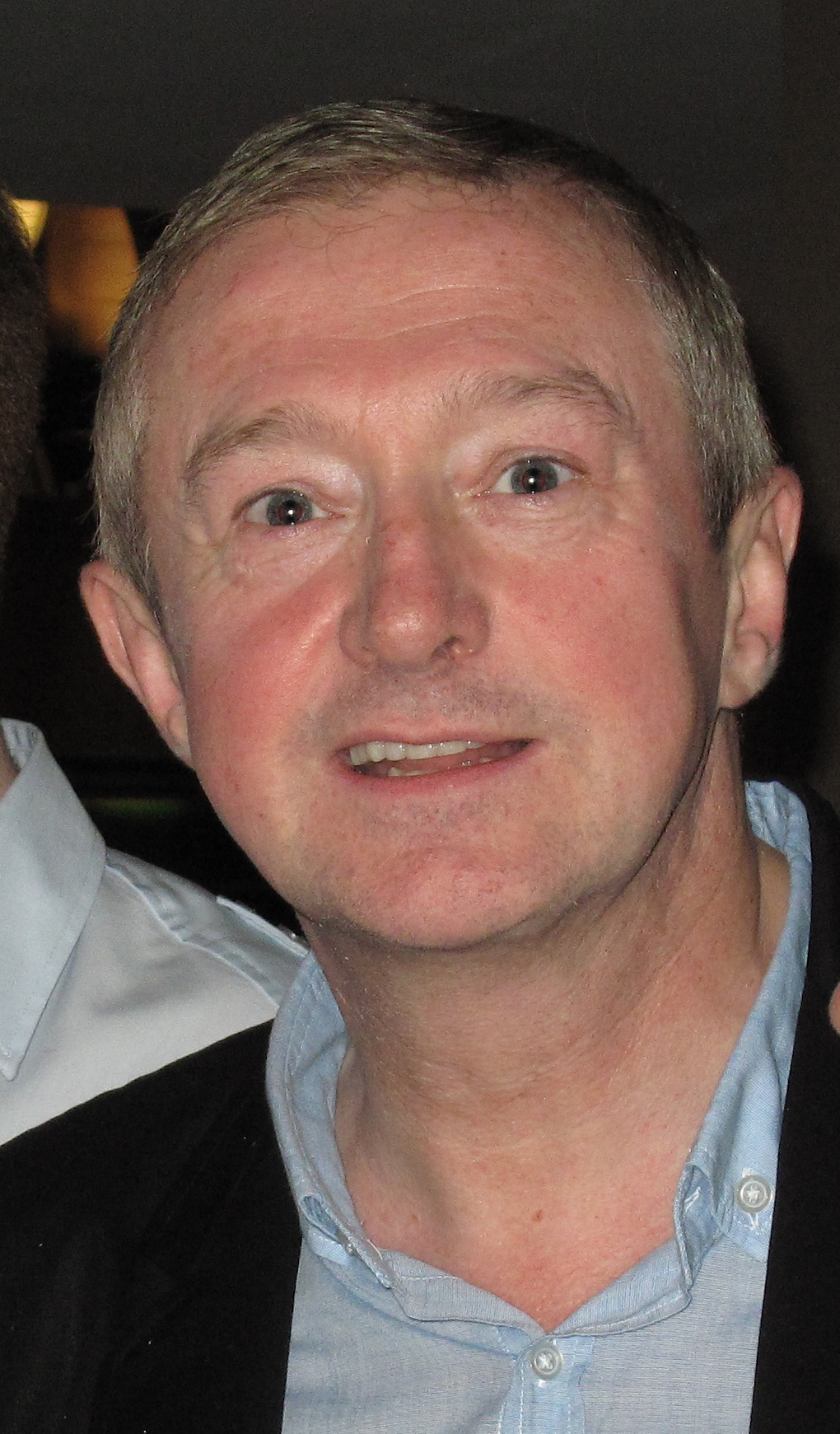
Louis Walsh (Guest)

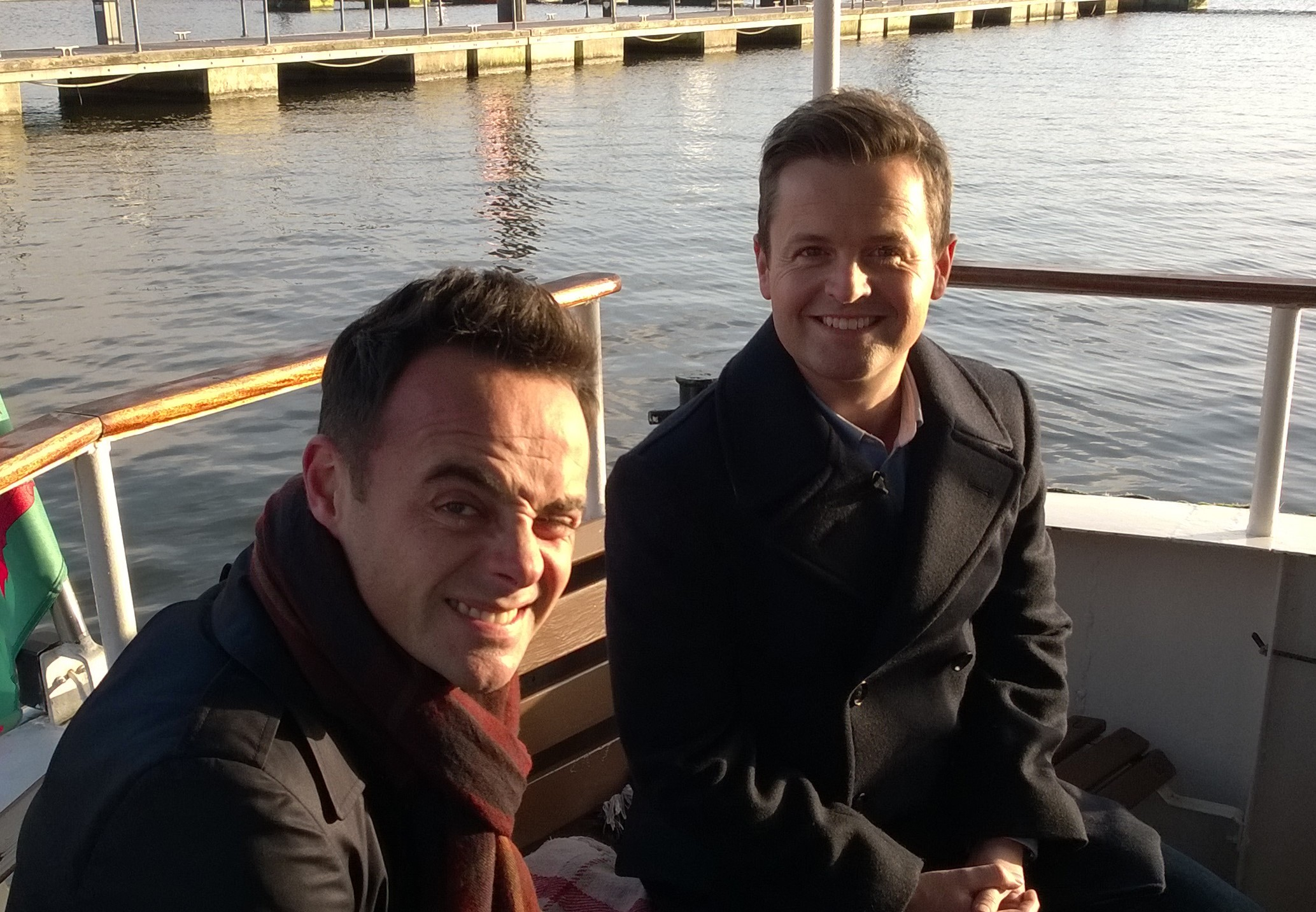
Ant & Dec (ITV1)

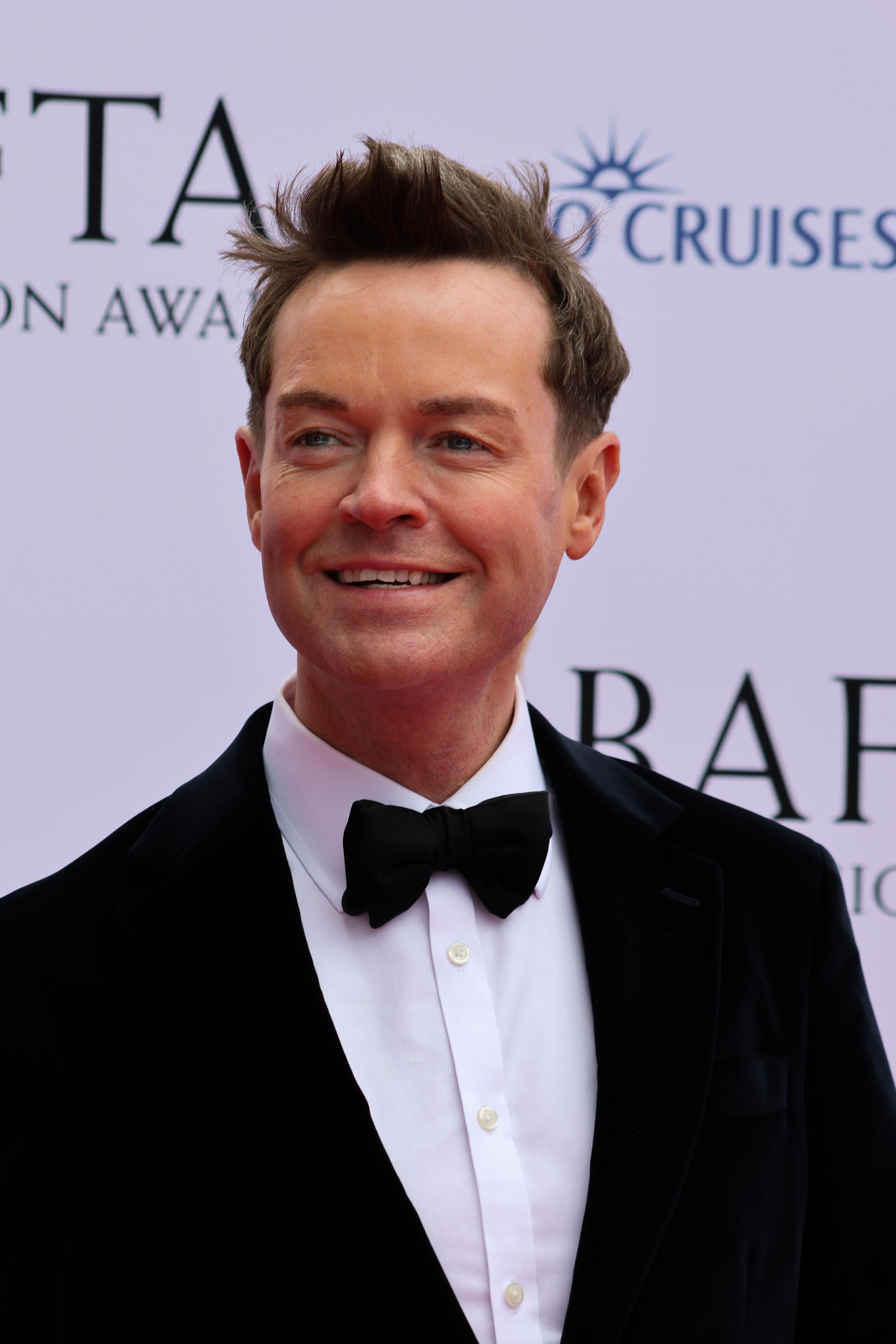
Stephen Mulhern (ITV2)

The fifth series of British talent competition programme Britain's Got Talent was broadcast on ITV, from 16 April to 4 June 2011; due to live coverage of the 2011 UEFA Champions League Final on 28 May, the final audition episode of the series was pushed back a day to avoid clashing with it. As Piers Morgan had departed from the programme the previous year, and the schedule of Simon Cowell made him unable to attend auditions, the producers arranged for Amanda Holden to be joined by David Hasselhoff and Michael McIntyre on the judging panel. Due to Hasselhoff's schedule during filming of the auditions, Louis Walsh stepped in as a guest judge for the sessions he could not attend.

This series saw the judging panel expanded to four judges for the first time in the programme's history, albeit for the live episodes – Cowell chose not to have either replacement drop out when he returned to attend the remainder of the contest. Because of this decision, the rules for the judges' vote had to be amended so that the public vote could be used to deal with a tied vote amongst the panel between the 2nd and 3rd placed semi-finalists of a semi-final. Apart from the change in format for the live rounds, the programme's studio used for live episodes was given a considerable revamp for the new series.

The fifth series was won by singer Jai McDowall, with singer Ronan Parke finishing in second place and boyband New Bounce third. During its broadcast, the series averaged around 10.9 million viewers, and was the first in the show's history to be aired in high definition. In an interview made after the series' broadcast, hosts Ant & Dec marked the fifth series as a poor one for the show because of the low quality of some of the participants that took part. During the broadcast of the fifth series, the programme faced accusations of unfair treatment to participants, while the producers had to bring in police to investigate a suspected act of online bullying against one of the semi-finalists during production.

== Series overview ==
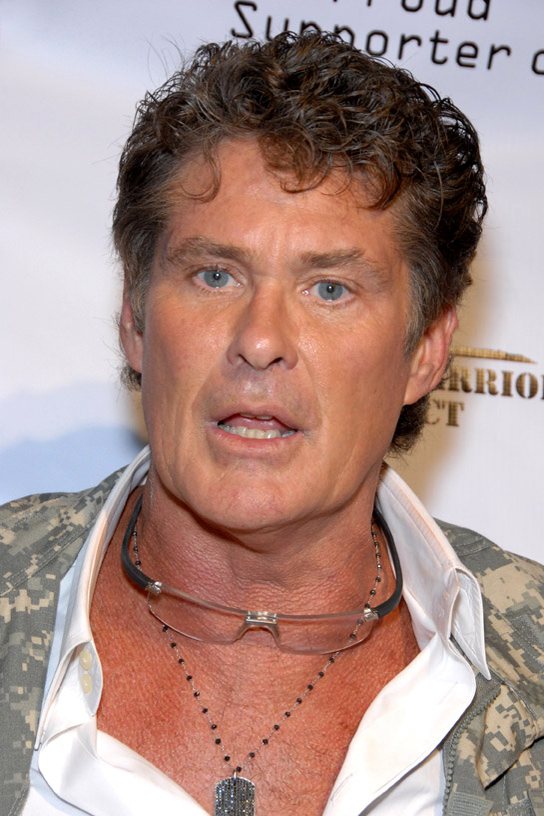
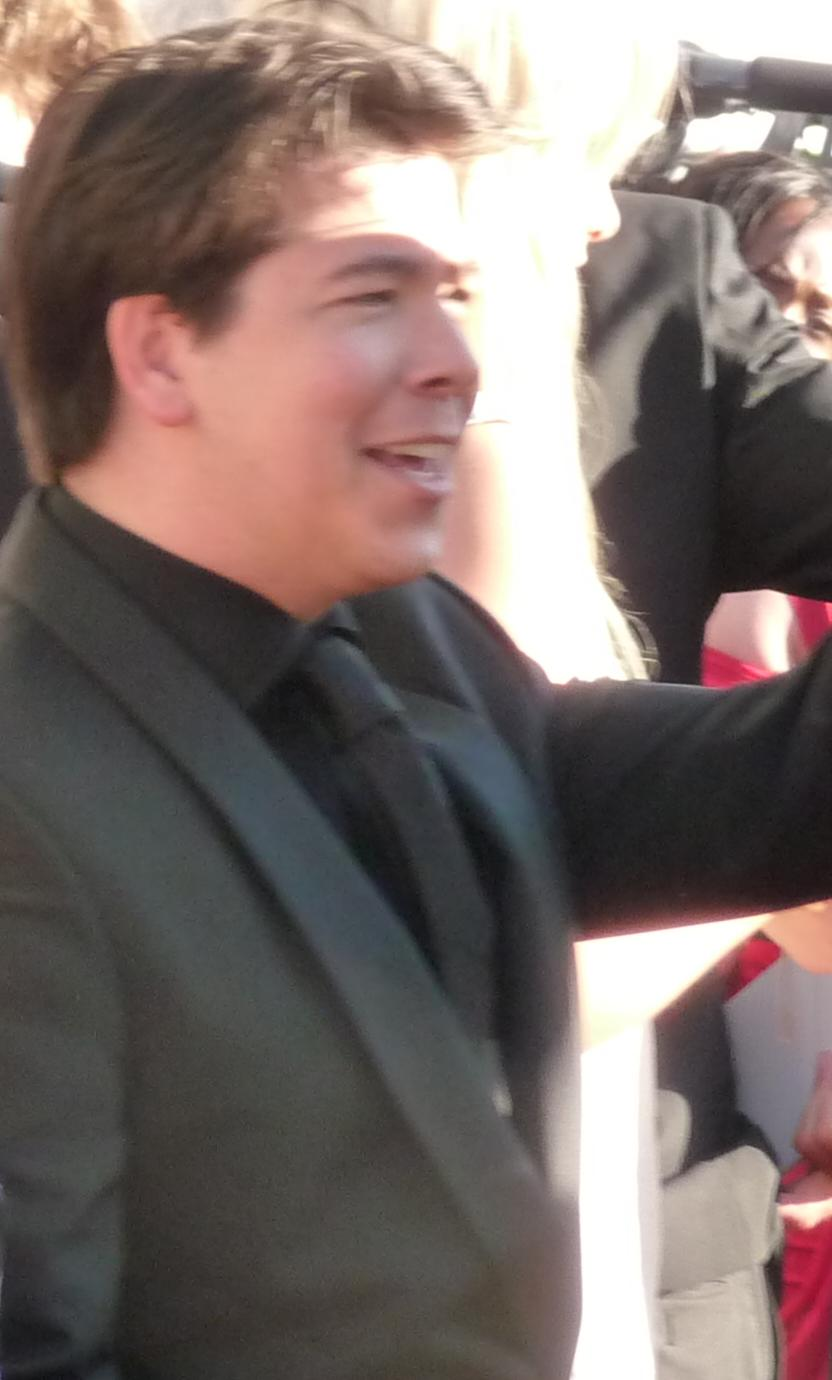
Both Hasselhoff and McIntyre took part in the fifth series as judges, the former having been a judge on America's Got Talent

Following open auditions held the previous year, the Judges' auditions took place across January and February 2011, within London, Manchester, Glasgow, Cardiff, Liverpool and Birmingham; an additional round of auditions were held in Birmingham on 3 April, consisting of those found through their online videos on YouTube. In December 2010, Simon Cowell revealed that, because of his commitments in launching the American version of The X Factor, he would only be present for the live episodes of this series. Both this announcement, and the departure of Piers Morgan the previous year, led to a change in the judging panel, in which Amanda Holden was joined by two new judges recruited by the producers – comedian Michael McIntyre; and actor David Hasselhoff, who had previously worked as a judge on America's Got Talent. Owing to his work schedule in 2011, Hasselhoff was forced to miss the London auditions, leading to Louis Walsh standing in for him as a guest judge.

Prior to filming, plans had been made to incorporate an element from the format of The X Factor, in which auditions would be attended by a guest judge for each one; such a format addition was later made for America's Got Talent in 2015. However, the format change was never made by the production team, for unknown reasons. For the first time in the show's history, after the auditions were over, some of the acts found themselves having to perform again, due to the judges facing some difficulty in making a final decision on whom to send through into the live semi-finals.

Of the participants that took part, only forty-one made it past this stage and into the five live semi-finals, with eight appearing in the first four and nine in the final semi-final, and ten of these acts making it into the live final. Because the live episodes now featured four judges, the rule on the judges' votes was modified as a result – if the judges were split over which two acts would follow the winner of the public vote, the decision would be made by which had received the second highest number of public votes. The following below lists the results of each participant's overall performance in this series:

Winner | Runner-Up | Finalist | Semi-Finalist

| Participant | Age(s) ^{1} | Genre | Performance Type | Semi-final | Result |
|---|---|---|---|---|---|
| Abyss | 17–28 | Dance | Dance Group | 3 | Eliminated |
| Angela & Teddy | 64 & 12 ^{2} | Animals | Dog Act | 3 | Eliminated |
| Antonio Popeye | 47 | Variety | Eye Popper | 5 | Eliminated |
| Bruce Sistaz | 19 & 27 | Acrobatics | Martial Arts Duo | 1 | Eliminated |
| Dance Angels Elite | 8–24 | Dance | Dance Group | 4 | Eliminated |
| David & Karen | 39 & 27 | Magic | Magic Duo | 2 | Eliminated |
| Donelda Guy | 66 ^{3} | Animals | Dog Act | 1 | Eliminated |
| Edward Reid | 35 | Comedy / Singing | Comic Singer | 4 | Eliminated |
| Enchantment | 17–51 | Acrobatics | Circus Group | 2 | Eliminated |
| Follow the Right Path | 14 & 13 | Singing | Rap Duo | 5 | Eliminated |
| Gay & Alan | 56 & 59 | Music | Handbell Players | 3 | Eliminated |
| Girls Roc | 22–25 | Dance | Fire Dance Group | 1 | Eliminated |
| Herbie Armstrong | 66 | Singing / Music | Singer & Guitarist | 2 | Eliminated |
| Jai McDowall | 24 | Singing | Singer | 4 | Winner |
| James Hobley | 11 | Dance | Contemporary Dancer | 3 | Finalist |
| Jay Worley | 17 | Singing | Singer | 3 | Eliminated |
| Jean Martyn | 59 | Music | Organist | 2 | Finalist |
| Jessica Hobson | 19 | Singing / Music | Singer & Pianist | 4 | Eliminated |
| Joe Oakley | 19 | Danger | Trial Bike Rider | 1 | Eliminated |
| Les Gibson | 41 | Comedy | Impressionist | 3 | Finalist |
| Lorna Bliss | 32 | Singing | Britney Spears Impersonator | 2 | Eliminated |
| Marawa | 28 | Variety | Hula Hoop Artist | 5 | Eliminated |
| Mexican Mayhem | 59, 4 & 3 ^{2} | Animals | Dog Act | 4 | Eliminated |
| Michael Collings | 19 | Singing / Music | Singer & Guitarist | 5 | Finalist |
| Michael Moral ^{5} | 21 | Dance | Breakdancer | 5 | Eliminated |
| Mr. & Mrs. | 44 & 55 | Singing / Music | Singing Duo & Keyboardist | 5 | Eliminated |
| Nathan Wyburn | 21 | Variety | Visual Artist | 4 | Eliminated |
| New Bounce | 12–16 | Singing | Boy Band | 2 | Third Place |
| Out of the Blue | 18–22 | Singing | A Cappella Group | 4 | Eliminated |
| Paul Gbegbaje | 19 | Music | Pianist | 1 | Finalist |
| Pip & Puppy | 20 & 6 months ^{2} | Singing / Animals | Opera Singer & Dog Act | 5 | Eliminated |
| Razy Gogonea | 28 | Dance | Breakdancer | 5 | Finalist |
| Ronan Parke | 12 | Singing | Singer | 1 | Runner-Up |
| Steven Hall | 53 | Comedy / Dance | Comic Dancer | 4 | Finalist |
| Stuart Arnold | 48 | Singing / Comedy | Rapping Terminator Impersonator | 1 | Eliminated |
| Ted & Grace | 92 & 21 | Singing | Singing Duo | 1 | Eliminated |
| The Celtic Colleens | 8–30 | Dance | Blacklight Dance Group | 5 | Eliminated |
| The Circus of Horrors | 18–54 | Acrobatics | Circus Group | 3 | Eliminated |
| Two and a Half Men | 26–28 | Dance | Dance Trio | 2 | Eliminated |
| Up & Over It | 31 & 31 | Dance | Table Based Dance Duo | 2 | Eliminated |
| Wachiraporn Tirpak | 27 | Variety | Entertainer | 3 | Eliminated |

- ^1 Ages denoted for a participant(s), pertain to their final performance for this series.
- ^2 The latter values pertain to the age of the dogs, as disclosed by their respective owners.
- ^3 The age of the animals used by Donelda Guy were not disclosed during their time on the programme.
- ^4 Locations for members of each respective group, or the group as a whole, were not disclosed during their time on the programme.
- ^5 Michael Moral was not originally given a place in the live rounds. His placement was due to the high standards of his performance leading Cowell to giving him a place as a semi-finalist.

=== Semi-finals summary ===
Buzzed out | Judges' vote | Won the public vote
Won the judges' vote | Lost the judges' vote | Eliminated

==== Semi-final 1 (30 May) ====
- Guest performance: Spelbound

| Semi-Finalist | Order | Performance Type | Buzzes and Judges' Vote | | | | Percentage | Result |
| Semi-Finalist | Order | Performance Type | Cowell | Holden | McIntyre | Hasselhoff | Percentage | Result |
|---|---|---|---|---|---|---|---|---|
| Girls Roc | 1 | Fire Dance Group | | | | | 1.0% | 7th - Eliminated |
| Donelda Guy | 2 | Dog Act | | | | | 4.0% | 5th - Eliminated |
| Stuart Arnold | 3 | Rapping Terminator Impersonator | | | | | 0.4% | 8th - Eliminated |
| Paul Gbegbaje | 4 | Pianist | | | | | 15.1% | 2nd (Judges' vote tied - Won on Public vote) |
| Bruce Sistaz | 5 | Martial Arts Duo | | | | | 6.2% | 4th - Eliminated |
| Ted & Grace | 6 | Singing Duo | | | | | 2.5% | 6th - Eliminated |
| Joe Oakley | 7 | Trial Bike Rider | | | | | 9.2% | 3rd (Judges' vote tied - Lost on Public vote) |
| Ronan Parke | 8 | Singer | | | | | 61.6% | 1st (Won Public vote) |

==== Semi-final 2 (31 May) ====
- Guest performance: Cast of Shrek the Musical ("I'm a Believer")

| Semi-Finalist | Order | Performance Type | Buzzes and Judges' Vote | | | | Percentage | Result |
| Semi-Finalist | Order | Performance Type | Cowell | Holden | McIntyre | Hasselhoff | Percentage | Result |
|---|---|---|---|---|---|---|---|---|
| Two and a Half Men | 1 | Dance Trio | | | | | 15.4% | 4th - Eliminated |
| Enchantment | 2 | Circus Group | | | | | 1.8% | 7th - Eliminated |
| Herbie Armstrong | 3 | Singer & Guitarist | | | | | 5.2% | 5th - Eliminated |
| Lorna Bliss | 4 | Britney Spears Impersonator | | | | | 1.5% | 8th - Eliminated |
| New Bounce | 5 | Boy Band | | | | | 34.3% | 1st (Won Public vote) |
| Jean Martyn | 6 | Organist | ^{6} | | | | 20.8% | 2nd (Won Judges' vote) |
| David & Karen | 7 | Illusion Duo | | | | | 16.5% | 3rd (Lost Judges' vote) |
| Up & Over It | 8 | Table Based Hand Dancers | | | | | 4.5% | 6th - Eliminated |

- ^6 Cowell did not cast his vote due to the majority support for Jean Martyn from the other judges, but admitted that his voting intention would have been for this semi-finalist.

==== Semi-final 3 (1 June) ====
- Guest performance: Avril Lavigne("What the Hell"/"Smile")

| Semi-Finalist | Order | Performance Type | Buzzes and Judges' Vote | | | | Percentage | Result |
| Semi-Finalist | Order | Performance Type | Cowell | Holden | McIntyre | Hasselhoff | Percentage | Result |
|---|---|---|---|---|---|---|---|---|
| The Circus of Horrors | 1 | Circus Group | | | | | 4.0% | 6th - Eliminated |
| Jay Worley | 2 | Singer | | | | | 7.8% | 4th - Eliminated |
| Angela & Teddy | 3 | Dog Act | | | | | 1.2% | 7th - Eliminated |
| Abyss | 4 | Street Dance Group | | | | | 4.5% | 5th - Eliminated |
| Wachiraporn Tirpak | 5 | Entertainer | | | | | 0.7% | 8th - Eliminated |
| Les Gibson | 6 | Impressionist | | | | | 38.1% | 1st (Won Public vote) |
| James Hobley | 7 | Contemporary Dancer | | | | | 33.0% | 2nd (Won Judges' vote) |
| Gay & Alan | 8 | Handbell Players | | | | | 10.7% | 3rd (Lost Judges' vote) |

==== Semi-final 4 (2 June) ====
- Guest performance: Jessie J ("Mamma Knows Best")

| Semi-Finalist | Order | Performance Type | Buzzes and Judges' Vote | | | | Percentage | Result |
| Semi-Finalist | Order | Performance Type | Cowell | Holden | McIntyre | Hasselhoff | Percentage | Result |
|---|---|---|---|---|---|---|---|---|
| Dance Angels Elite | 1 | Dance Troupe | | | | | 2.3% | 6th - Eliminated |
| Jessica Hobson | 2 | Singer & Pianist | | | | | 4.7% | 5th - Eliminated |
| Mexican Mayhem | 3 | Dog Act | | | | | 0.4% | 8th - Eliminated |
| Out of the Blue | 4 | A Capella Group | | | | | 11.8% | 4th - Eliminated |
| Nathan Wyburn | 5 | Visual Artist | | | | | 1.0% | 7th - Eliminated |
| Jai McDowall | 6 | Singer | | | | | 42.9% | 1st (Won Public vote) |
| Steven Hall | 7 | Comic Dancer | | | | | 13.0% | 3rd (Won Judges' vote) |
| Edward Reid | 8 | Comic Singer | | | | | 23.9% | 2nd (Lost Judges' vote) |

==== Semi-final 5 (3 June) ====
- Guest performance: Diversity & JLS ("Eyes Wide Shut"/"Everybody in Love")

| Semi-Finalist | Order | Performance Type | Buzzes and Judges' Vote | | | | Percentage | Result |
| Semi-Finalist | Order | Performance Type | Cowell | Holden | McIntyre | Hasselhoff | Percentage | Result |
|---|---|---|---|---|---|---|---|---|
| Marawa | 1 | Hula Hoop Artist | | | | | 1.1% | 7th - Eliminated |
| Pip & Puppy | 2 | Opera Singer & Singing Dog | | | | | 12.0% | 3rd (Lost Judges' vote) |
| The Celtic Colleens | 3 | Blacklight Dance Group | | | | | 8.1% | 4th - Eliminated |
| Mr. & Mrs. | 4 | Singing Duo & Keyboardist | | | | | 0.3% | 9th - Eliminated |
| Follow the Right Path | 5 | Rap Duo | | | | | 5.6% | 6th - Eliminated |
| Antonio Popeye ^{7} | 6 | Eye Popper | | | | | 0.6% | 8th - Eliminated |
| Michael Moral | 7 | Breakdancer | | | | | 6.8% | 5th - Eliminated |
| Michael Collings | 8 | Singer & Guitarist | | | | ^{8} | 29.5% | 2nd (Won Judges' vote) |
| Razy Gogonea | 9 | Breakdancer | | | | | 36.0% | 1st (Won Public vote) |

- ^7 Jedward made a special appearance for this performance as backing dancers & singers.
- ^8 Hasselhoff did not cast his vote due to the majority support for Michael Collings from the other judges, but admitted that his voting intention would have been for this semi-finalist.

=== Final (4 June) ===
- Guest performances: Jackie Evancho ("Nessun dorma") and Nicole Scherzinger ("Right There")

Winner | Runner-up

| Finalist | Order | Performance Type | Percentage | Finished |
|---|---|---|---|---|
| Steven Hall | 1 | Comic Dancer | 5.4% | 7th |
| Michael Collings | 2 | Singer & Guitarist | 7.7% | 5th |
| Les Gibson | 3 | Impressionist | 2.6% | 9th |
| James Hobley | 4 | Contemporary Dancer | 3.5% | 8th |
| Paul Gbegbaje | 5 | Pianist | 5.8% | 6th |
| Ronan Parke | 6 | Singer | 26.7% | 2nd |
| Jean Martyn | 7 | Organist | 2.0% | 10th |
| Jai McDowall | 8 | Singer | 29.1% | 1st |
| Razy Gogonea | 9 | Breakdancer | 8.4% | 4th |
| New Bounce | 10 | Boy Band | 8.9% | 3rd |

== Ratings ==
| Episode | Air Date | Total viewers (millions) | ITV1 Weekly rank | Viewer Share (%) |
|---|---|---|---|---|
| Auditions 1 | 16 April | 11.42 | 3 | 40.5 |
| Auditions 2 | 23 April | 10.62 | 3 | 41.5 |
| Auditions 3 | 30 April | 10.65 | 1 | 39.9 |
| Auditions 4 | 7 May | 11.69 | 1 | 42.2 |
| Auditions 5 | 14 May | 9.72 | 3 | 32.0 |
| Auditions 6 | 21 May | 11.16 | 1 | 42.2 |
| Auditions 7 | 29 May | 11.53 | 1 | 40.4 |
| Semi-final 1 | 30 May | 12.27 | 4 | 41.9 |
| Semi-final 1 results | 30 May | 11.16 | 6 | 38.2 |
| Semi-final 2 | 31 May | 10.65 | 10 | 40.5 |
| Semi-final 2 results | 31 May | 10.04 | 15 | 35.8 |
| Semi-final 3 | 1 June | 10.31 | 16 | 41.8 |
| Semi-final 3 results | 1 June | 8.67 | 17 | 28.9 |
| Semi-final 4 | 2 June | 10.53 | 12 | 43.2 |
| Semi-final 4 results | 2 June | 10.48 | 11 | 39.1 |
| Semi-final 5 | 3 June | 10.36 | 14 | 43.3 |
| Semi-final 5 results | 3 June | 10.61 | 9 | 42.3 |
| Live final | 4 June | 12.70 | 2 | 47.0 |
| Live final results | 4 June | 12.95 | 1 | 49.3 |

== Criticism & incidents ==
The fifth series saw Britain's Got Talent face criticism from viewers, via social media, over unfair treatment on a participant. Their concern was over the performance of Jessica Hobson during her semi-final, and the belief her choice of song had been fixed by producers to ensure she would lose. Britain's Got More Talent presenter Stephen Mulhern refuted the allegations made by the complaints, making clear that production staff maintain high commitment to the well-being of participants (such as had been done for Susan Boyle in the third series) and that Hobson's performance had not been rigged against her.

One of the more serious matters that occurred off-camera was the publication of a malicious blog against the participant Ronan Parke, which claimed that the competition had been fixed so that the singer would win and that he had been groomed by Simon Cowell's company Syco for two years in preparation to fulfil a record contract. However, Parke's family, Cowell, the producers and Syco, refuted the claims in the blog, even one that the blogger was an executive in the company, highlighting that the information was false and unsubstantiated. Producers determined that the nature of the blog was effectively malicious and aimed at bullying Parke online. Police were brought in to investigate the motivation of the blogger's action, and resulted in the culprit being cautioned and ordered to apologise for the distress caused to those involved.
