= Live 2012 (Coldplay album) =

2012 live album by Coldplay

- Theatrical release poster
- Directed by: Paul Dugdale
- Produced by: Jim Parsons; Rik Simpson
- Starring: Guy Berryman; Jonny Buckland; Will Champion; Chris Martin
- Narrated by: Guy Berryman; Jonny Buckland; Will Champion; Chris Martin
- Cinematography: James Tonkin; Brett Turnbull
- Edited by: Simon Bryant; Tim Thompsett; Tom Watson
- Music by: Coldplay; Jon Hopkins
- Distributed by: Parlophone
- Release date: 13 November 2012
- Running time: 96 minutes
- Country: United Kingdom
- Language: English

Live 2012

Live album by Coldplay
- Released: 19 November 2012
- Recorded: June 2011 – September 2012
- Genres: Alternative rock; post-Britpop; electronic rock
- Length: 66:36
- Labels: Parlophone; Capitol
- Producers: Coldplay; Jim Parsons

Coldplay chronology
Mylo Xyloto (2011)	Live 2012 (2012)	Ghost Stories (2014)

Live 2012 is the collective name for the official documentation of the Mylo Xyloto Tour, performed, recorded and released by British alternative rock band Coldplay. The project consists of a worldwide theatrical and home media film release, Coldplay's third live album, after Live 2003 and LeftRightLeftRightLeft, and a 183-page e-book depicting the tour.

The film and album were recorded over many dates over their 2011 festival dates and the Mylo Xyloto Tour, which began in December 2011 and concluded in September 2012. The film premiered on 13 November 2012 at select cinemas around the world. The DVD, Blu-ray and live album release occurred on 19 November 2012.

== Release and promotion ==
The film was first announced by Phil Harvey in April 2012. It was first announced under the title "ColdplayFilm". The name was also inscribed on the Xylobands used on the Mylo Xyloto Tour between April and September 2012. The bracelets were conceptualized and created for use in Live 2012 and used in all future world tours that the band has gone on to complete, changing slightly in variation and material. The film/album was first officially announced on 25 September 2012. On the same day, two websites promoting Live 2012 launched. One promoting the theatrical release of the film, and one promoting the project in general. A two-minute trailer accompanied the announcement, released online and shown in theaters attached to other films as well. In addition, an exclusive preview of "Us Against the World" was shown on the Live 2012 website, as well as another select track off the film of user's choice. A 183-page eBook documenting the tour was also announced.

Live 2012 was first released as an exclusive, one-night-only theatrical release, shown in cinemas across 57 countries around the world. The film opened at 7:00pm at respective time zones (7:30pm at some screenings), on 13 November 2012. The film was shown twice on the night, closing before midnight. A partnership deal between Parlophone and Studio 3 saw the screening of Live 2012 on US premium cable television as well. The film aired exclusively on 14 November 2012 on Epix, the night after the theatrical release and a week before its commercial release in the United States.

== Critical reception ==
Professional ratings
Review scores
Source	Rating
Contactmusic	9/10
Digital Spy	5/5 stars
Drowned in Sound	7/10
Herald Sun	4.5/5
HeyUGuys!	4.5/5 stars
IndieWire	B+
Record Collector	5/5 stars
The Upcoming	5/5 stars

Live 2012 was met with widespread acclaim from music critics. Herald Sun's Cameron Adams commented that "this is the exact show Coldplay are in the midst of charming our country with—wristbands, hits, banter, yoga moves and all." He also commended the track listing, as "Their biggest hits ('Paradise', 'Viva la Vida', 'Fix You') sit nicely with their more subversive ones ('Violet Hill', 'Every Teardrop Is a Waterfall')". Sarah Milton of The Upcoming stated that "This release of their previous and current work defines their unstoppable prowess by taking tracks to a personal level with their fans. This is a skill not many achieve live, but with this album, Coldplay succeeds. It deserves immense recognition, and we can rest assured that [the band] will keep raising the bar of stadium rock shows".

Jim Pusey from Contactmusic praised the film for its visual effects and cinematography. He compared it to Live 2003, noticing "a band that's now less awkward and self-conscious". He also gave a positive note to the documentary itself, with the most interesting parts being the "behind the scenes interludes that punctuate the performances. Each band member has an opportunity to reveal not only their enthusiasm for playing live around the globe, but also their perspective on the different elements that have made up the tour [...] This peek behind the curtain is beneficial as it makes the gig footage from [three] different stops on the tour (including their most recent Glastonbury headline set) more engaging". In a piece for HeyUGuys!, Kenji Lloyd wrote that the film "goes above and beyond any ordinary concert film, which is just what you'd expect from a band that isn't any ordinary band. They go the further mile, always looking to take things further, do things better, make the extra effort".

Drew Taylor of IndieWire claimed that "the documentary should be longer", but "even a cursory understanding of what it’s like to watch Coldplay live is better than nothing at all. Wristbands not included". In a less enthusiastic review, James Atherton from Drowned in Sound mentioned that Coldplay are "really nice", but "their output is often too sanitised to make the jump from good to great", with the first track on Live 2012 seemingly reinforcing the sentiment. He also said that "For such a successful outfit, it’s intriguing to hear that this tour has been the first time the band has felt ready to play stadiums", referencing a quote given by guitarist Jonny Buckland in an interview within the film.

Adam Silverstein wrote a defensive review on Digital Spy, saying that the film/album was pulled off well amidst mixed reputation, writing "One (thankfully first-class) collab with a popstar and an appearance on The X Factor later, however, and they almost fucked their rep... Chris Martin bawling backing vocals to the Little Mix girls would have been uglier than Javier Bardem toothless in Skyfall, yet that's all it would have taken". Silverstein felt the film reveals the "ridiculous effort that goes in to each and every concert", and "skillfully showcases just how incredible an adventure it is to observe a world-beating band at the top of their game".

Panorama ranked Live 2012 as one of the best international releases of the year. In 2013, Coldplay were nominated in the Foreign Classic Pop/Rock Album of the Year category at the Hungarian Music Awards for the audio release part of the project. Months later, the film release was among the Best Music Film nominees for the 56th Grammy Awards.

== Track listing ==
All songs written by Coldplay's songwriting members Guy Berryman, Jonny Buckland, Will Champion and Chris Martin. Except tracks originally released on Mylo Xyloto, written by Coldplay and Brian Eno.

CD / digital download track listing
No.	Title	Original album	Length
1.	"Mylo Xyloto" (Stade de France, 2 September 2012)	Mylo Xyloto, 2011	0:56
2.	"Hurts Like Heaven" (Stade de France, 2 September 2012)	Mylo Xyloto	4:16
3.	"In My Place" (Stade de France, 2 September 2012)	A Rush of Blood to the Head, 2002	3:54
4.	"Major Minus" (Plaza de Toros de Las Ventas, 26 October 2011 / Stade de France, 2 September 2012)	Mylo Xyloto	3:39
5.	"Yellow" (Stade de France, 2 September 2012)	Parachutes, 2000	6:51
6.	"God Put a Smile upon Your Face" (Stade de France, 2 September 2012)	A Rush of Blood to the Head	5:21
7.	"Princess of China" (with Rihanna, Stade de France, 2 September 2012)	Mylo Xyloto	3:48
8.	"Up in Flames" (Stade de France, 2 September 2012)	Mylo Xyloto	3:17
9.	"Viva la Vida" (Glastonbury Festival, 25 June 2011)	Viva la Vida or Death and All His Friends, 2008	4:58
10.	"Charlie Brown" (Stade de France, 2 September 2012)	Mylo Xyloto	5:00
11.	"Paradise" (Stade de France, 2 September 2012)	Mylo Xyloto	5:32
12.	"Us Against the World" (Bell Centre, 27 July 2012)	Mylo Xyloto	3:52
13.	"Clocks" (Bell Centre, 27 July 2012)	A Rush of Blood to the Head	4:44
14.	"Fix You" (Stade de France, 2 September 2012)	X&Y, 2005	5:00
15.	"Every Teardrop Is a Waterfall" (with "M.M.I.X." (introduction), Stade de France, 2 September 2012 / Glastonbury Festival, 25 June 2011 / Bell Centre, 27 July 2012 / Hollywood Bowl, 4 May 2012 / Plaza de Toros de Las Ventas, 26 October 2011)	Mylo Xyloto	5:25

Film / DVD / Blu-ray track listing
No.	Title	Original album	Length
1.	"Intro" (includes elements of "Takk...")		0:37
2.	"Mylo Xyloto"		0:43
3.	"Hurts Like Heaven"		4:02
4.	"In My Place"		3:48
5.	"Intermission 1" (Narrated by Chris Martin, includes elements of "Don't Let It Break Your Heart")		4:08
6.	"Major Minus"		3:30
7.	"Yellow"		4:29
8.	"Intermission 2" (Narrated by Jonny Buckland, includes elements of "Charlie Brown")		3:51
9.	"Violet Hill" (La Cigale, 31 October 2011)	Viva la Vida or Death and All His Friends	3:49
10.	"God Put a Smile upon Your Face"		4:58
11.	"Princess of China" (with Rihanna)		3:59
12.	"Intermission 3" (Narrated by Will Champion, includes elements of "The Escapist" and "Major Minus")		3:02
13.	"Up in Flames"		3:13
14.	"Viva la Vida"		4:01
15.	"Intermission 4" (Narrated by Guy Berryman, includes elements of "Up with the Birds")		3:45
16.	"Charlie Brown"		4:45
17.	"Paradise"		4:37
18.	"Us Against the World"		3:59
19.	"Clocks"		5:07
20.	"Intermission 5" (Narrated by Chris Martin, includes elements of "Mylo Xyloto" and "Hurts Like Heaven")		3:09
21.	"Fix You"		4:54
22.	"Every Teardrop Is a Waterfall" (with "M.M.I.X." (introduction))		4:49
23.	"Outro and Credits" (includes "Up with the Birds")		5:27

DVD / Blu-ray Extras
No.	Title	Original album	Length
24.	"The Scientist" (Stade de France, 2 September 2012)	A Rush of Blood to the Head	5:09
25.	"Don't Let It Break Your Heart" (with "A Hopeful Transmission" (introduction) Stade de France, 2 September 2012)	Mylo Xyloto	4:27
26.	"Photo Gallery"		4:05

Sample credits

- "Every Teardrop Is a Waterfall" incorporates elements of "Ritmo De La Noche" written by Alex Christensen, Harry Castioni, Bela Lagonda and Jeff Wycombe, which incorporates elements of "I Go to Rio" written by Peter Allen and Adrienne Anderson.
- "Princess of China" features a sample from "Takk..." written by Jón Þór Birgisson, Orri Páll Dýrason, Georg Hólm and Kjartan Sveinsson, performed by Sigur Rós.
- "Up with the Birds" features a sample from "Driven by You" by Brian May. It also includes a lyrical sample from "Anthem" by Leonard Cohen.

== Personnel ==
Coldplay

- Guy Berryman – bass guitar, backing vocals, keyboards
- Jonny Buckland – lead guitar, backing vocals, keyboards
- Will Champion – drums, backing vocals, acoustic guitar, keyboard, electronic drums
- Chris Martin – lead vocals, acoustic guitar, piano, rhythm guitar on "God Put a Smile Upon Your Face" and "Don't Let It Break Your Heart"

Additional musicians

- Rihanna – vocals (on "Princess of China")

Technical

- Rik Simpson – mixing
- Olga Fitzroy – additional mixing
- Christian Green – additional mixing assistant
- Bob Ludwig – mastering
- Jon Hopkins – additional film music

Visual crew

- Paul Dugdale – director
- Jim Parsons – producer
- Dave Holmes, Phil Harvey, Juke Jakobek, Stefan Demetriou, Arlene Moon – executive producers
- Brett Turnball, James Tonkin – directors of photography
- Simon Bryant, Tim Thopsett, Tom Watson – editors
- Janet Fraser Crook – director (Glastonbury footage)
- Alison Howe – producer (Glastonbury footage)
- Ben Chadis, Mark Cooper – executive producers (Glastonbury footage)

Art

- Tappin Gofton – artwork designer and director
- Paris, Misty Buckley, Reggie Matheson – front cover
- Matt Miller, Benjamin Etridge, Eric Schleicher, Xavi Menas, Wendy Marvel, Sarah Lee, Nick Pickles, Phil Harvey – photos

Live crew

- Paul Narmandale – design
- Phil Harvey – director
- Dave Holmes – manager
- Misty Buckley – stage and prop design
- Paris, Gwen Liby, Misty Buckley, Reggie Matheson, Lynden Mallinson – painting

== Charts ==
=== Weekly charts ===
Weekly chart performance
Chart (2012–2016)	Peak position
Australian Music DVDs (ARIA)	1
Austrian Albums (Ö3 Austria)	10
Belgian Music DVDs (Ultratop Flanders)	1
Belgian Music DVDs (Ultratop Wallonia)	1
Brazilian Music DVDs (ABPD)	2
Chinese Music DVDs (Sino Chart)	3
Croatian International Albums (HDU)	27
Czech Albums (ČNS IFPI)	4
Danish Music DVDs (Tracklisten)	1
Dutch Albums (Album Top 100)	75
Dutch Music DVDs (MegaCharts)	1
French Albums (SNEP)	5
German Albums (Offizielle Top 100)	3
Irish Music DVDs (IRMA)	1
Italian Albums (FIMI)	10
Italian Music DVDs (FIMI)	1
Japanese DVD Sales (Oricon)	54
Japanese Blu-Ray Sales (Oricon)	34
Mexican Albums (Top 100 Mexico)	6
Polish Albums (ZPAV)	11
Portuguese Music DVDs (AFP)	1
South Korean Albums (Gaon)	5
South Korean International Albums (Gaon)	1
Spanish Music DVDs (Promusicae)	1
Swiss Albums (Schweizer Hitparade)	11
Swiss Music DVDs (Schweizer Hitparade)	1
UK Music Videos (Official Charts)	1
US Music Video Sales (Billboard)	2

=== Monthly charts ===
Monthly chart performance
Chart (2012–2013)	Peak position
Argentine Albums (CAPIF)	4
South Korean Albums (Gaon)	37
South Korean International Albums (Gaon)	3
Uruguayan Albums (CUD)	10

=== Year-end charts ===
Year-end chart performance
Chart (2012)	Position
Australian Music DVDs (ARIA)	2
Belgian Music DVDs (Ultratop Flanders)	4
Belgian Music DVDs (Ultratop Wallonia)	3
Brazilian Music DVDs (ABPD)	9
Dutch Music DVDs (MegaCharts)	1
French Albums (SNEP)	38
German Albums (Offizielle Top 100)	59
Irish Music DVDs (IRMA)	3
Italian Albums (FIMI)	85
Polish Albums (ZPAV)	23
South Korean International Albums (Gaon)	94
Worldwide Albums (IFPI)	37

Chart (2013)	Position
Australian Music DVDs (ARIA)	5
Belgian Music DVDs (Ultratop Flanders)	8
Belgian Music DVDs (Ultratop Wallonia)	3
Dutch Music DVDs (MegaCharts)	2
Mexican Albums (AMPROFON)	75
Swiss Music DVDs (Schweizer Hitparade)	8
US Music Video Sales (Billboard)	5

Chart (2014)	Position
Australian Music DVDs (ARIA)	16

Chart (2015)	Position
Australian Music DVDs (ARIA)	37

Chart (2016)	Position
Australian Music DVDs (ARIA)	21

Chart (2017)	Position
Australian Music DVDs (ARIA)	36

Chart (2018)	Position
Australian Music DVDs (ARIA)	47

Chart (2020)	Position
Portuguese Music DVDs (AFP)	114

Chart (2022)	Position
Portuguese Music DVDs (AFP)	20

== Certifications and sales ==
Certifications and sales
Region	Certification	Certified units/sales
Album
Colombia (ASINCOL)	Gold	5,000 (Note: Colombian certified sales for Live 2012 as of December 2012.)
France (SNEP)	Platinum	100,000^{*}
Italy (FIMI)	Gold	30,000^{*}
Mexico (AMPROFON)	Gold	30,000^{^}
New Zealand (RMNZ)	Gold	7,500^{‡}
South Korea	—	1,643 (Note: South Korean year-end physical sales for Live 2012 in 2012.)
Video
Australia (ARIA)	7× Platinum	105,000^{^}
Canada (Music Canada)	4× Platinum	40,000^{^}
Colombia (ASINCOL)	Gold	5,000
France (SNEP)	Diamond	60,000^{*}
Portugal (AFP)	3× Platinum	24,000^{^}
Spain (Promusicae)	Gold	10,000^{^}
United Kingdom (BPI)	4× Platinum	200,000^{^}
Summaries
Worldwide (IFPI)	—	1,100,000 (Note: Global total sales for Live 2012 as of January 2013.)
^{*} Sales figures based on certification alone.^{^} Shipments figures based on certification alone.^{‡} Sales+streaming figures based on certification alone.

== Release history ==
Country	Date	Label	Format	Catalog no.
Worldwide	13 November 2012	N/A	Theatrical release	N/A
United Kingdom	19 November 2012	Parlophone, EMI	CD+DVD, DVD+CD, Blu-ray Disc+CD, Digital download	50999 015137 2 1, P015 1372 (CD+DVD); 50999 015139 9 8, P015 1399 (DVD+CD); 50999 015141 9 3, P015 1419 (BD+CD)
Canada	20 November 2012	Capitol	CD+DVD, DVD+CD, Blu-ray Disc+CD, Digital download	509990 15137 2 1 (CD+DVD)
United States	20 November 2012	Capitol	CD+DVD, DVD+CD, Blu-ray Disc+CD, Digital download	509990 15137 2 1 (CD+DVD)
Italy	20 November 2012	Parlophone, EMI	CD+DVD, DVD+CD, Blu-ray Disc+CD, Digital download	50999 015137 2 1, P015 1372 (CD+DVD); 50999 015139 9 8, P015 1399 (DVD+CD); 50999 015141 9 3, P015 1419 (BD+CD)
Spain	20 November 2012	Parlophone, EMI	CD+DVD, DVD+CD, Blu-ray Disc+CD, Digital download	50999 015137 2 1, P015 1372 (CD+DVD); 50999 015139 9 8, P015 1399 (DVD+CD); 50999 015141 9 3, P015 1419 (BD+CD)
Mexico	20 November 2012	Parlophone, EMI	CD+DVD, DVD+CD, Blu-ray Disc+CD, Digital download	50999 015137 2 1, P015 1372 (CD+DVD); 50999 015139 9 8, P015 1399 (DVD+CD); 50999 015141 9 3, P015 1419 (BD+CD)
Thailand	20 November 2012	Parlophone, EMI	CD+DVD, DVD+CD, Blu-ray Disc+CD, Digital download	50999 015137 2 1, P015 1372 (CD+DVD); 50999 015139 9 8, P015 1399 (DVD+CD); 50999 015141 9 3, P015 1419 (BD+CD)
Korea	20 November 2012	Parlophone, EMI	CD+DVD, DVD+CD, Blu-ray Disc+CD, Digital download	50999 015137 2 1, P015 1372 (CD+DVD); 50999 015139 9 8, P015 1399 (DVD+CD); 50999 015141 9 3, P015 1419 (BD+CD)
Sweden	21 November 2012	EMI	CD+DVD, DVD+CD, Blu-ray Disc+CD, Digital download	50999 015137 2 1, P015 1372 (CD+DVD); 50999 015139 9 8, P015 1399 (DVD+CD); 50999 015141 9 3, P015 1419 (BD+CD)
China	31 August 2013	Starsing Culture	CD+DVD	9787798503234
