= Tappin Gofton =

Tappin Gofton is a graphic design agency consisting of Mark Tappin and Simon Gofton, best known for designing album covers.

== History ==
Tappin Gofton was founded by Mark Tappin, who worked at Blue Source, and Simon Gofton of Tom Hingston Studio. They incorporated as Tappin Gofton in 2006.

The duo first became known for their 1960s-style cover for The Chemical Brothers' album Push the Button. Their Baudot code-inspired art for Coldplay's album X&Y, however, was a larger breakthrough for the duo; Design Observer critic Adrian Shaughnessy wrote that it "[established] them as a new force in contemporary music design." The duo would later design covers for several more Coldplay albums, including Viva la Vida or Death and all His Friends, and Mylo Xyloto.

The duo has also designed covers for The Chemical Brothers' album We Are the Night; Air Traffic's debut album Fractured Life; Morning Runner's debut album Wilderness Is Paradise Now; Wild Beasts' album Present Tense; and The Feeling's debut Twelve Stops and Home.

The company was dissolved in 2015.

=== Album cover designs (1997-present) ===
- Coldplay:
    - "'Yellow'" single (2000) (Mark Tappin only)
  - Parachutes (2000) (Mark Tappin only)
    - '"Trouble" single (2000) (Mark Tappin only)
    - "Don't Panic'" single (2001) (Mark Tappin only)
    - '"Trouble - Norwegian Live EP'" (2001) (Mark Tappin only)
  - Live 2003 (2003) (Mark Tappin only)
  - X&Y (2005)
    - "Speed of Sound'" single (2005)
    - "Fix You" single (2005)
    - "Talk" single (2005)
    - "The Hardest Part" single (2006)
    - "What If" single (2006)
    - "White Shadows" single (2007)
  - Viva la Vida or Death and All His Friends (2008)
  - Prospekt's March EP (2008)
  - LeftRightLeftRightLeft EP (2009) (maybe)
  - Mylo Xyloto (2011)
    - "Every Teardrop Is a Waterfall" single (2011)
    - "Paradise" single (2011)
    - "Charlie Brown" single (2011)
    - "Princess of China" single (2012)
    - "Hurts Like Heaven" single (2012)
    - "Up in Flames" single (2012)
  - Live 2012 (2012)
