= Mylo Xyloto (comics) =

2013 graphic novel

- Cover art by Arthur Hugot

Publication information
- Publisher: Bongo Comics
- Genre: Science fiction
- No. of issues: 7

Creative team
- Written by: Mark Osborne; Dylan Haggerty
- Artist: Alejandro Fuentes
- Letterer: Nate Piekos
- Colorist: Steve Hamaker

Mylo Xyloto is a comic book series created by British rock band Coldplay and filmmaker Mark Osborne. It ties into (and tells the story of) the band's fifth studio album Mylo Xyloto (2011).

== Publication history ==
On 10 July 2012 the Coldplay website announced a six-part Mylo Xyloto comic, with the first issue to be released at that week's Comic-Con. Published by Bongo Comics, the story followed the tale of Mylo, a 'Silencer', who, in the words of co-writer Mark Osborne (filmmaker), is a part of a "war against sound and colour". Together with Osborne, Dylan Haggerty also writes the comic (starting in the second issue) with art by Alejandro Fuentes.

== Main characters ==
- Mylo: a disillusioned Silencer (a member of Silencia's secret police) who joins the rebels after he touches one of the Sparkers' musical graffiti.
- Rex: a fellow Silencer of Mylo's who is devoted to his work and the struggle against the Sparkers.
- Major Minus: the Irdok's representative on Silencia and the public face of Irdok rule. He is also the Irdok official that oversees the Silencers. He appears on the Hypnofeed regularly on the show Miles of Smiles, and he publishes propaganda about Sparkers and colour.
- Fly: the leader of the Sparkers and the romantic interest for Mylo. She is such a significant threat to Major Minus that he offers free Hypnofeed to the person who catches her.

== Synopsis ==
In the world of Silencia, a species known as the Irdoks rule over the Silencians in a dystopian police state. They have a military police force recruited from Silencians known as the Silencers, which are taught to enforce the Irdok's rule of law, which is known as Chromatic and Acoustic Level Management (CALM). The Irdoks defend their policy of CALM by talking about a "Great War of Colour" which brought about a species known as the Eaters which the Irdoks protect the Silencians from. To make up for the lack of colour and sound in their world, the Silencians use a tool known as the Hypnofeed, which constantly feeds them with visual and (ostensibly) audio stimulation. Major Minus, however, has a problem involving continued rebellion by a section of the populace known as the Sparkers, who create Sparks (which are colourful musical graffiti) in an effort to wake the populace up from the Hypnofeed.

== Issues ==
- Issue 0 – The Car Kids ("Hurts Like Heaven" music video)
- Issue 1 – Colour Is Crime
- Issue 2 – Cover-Up
- Issue 3 – Another World
- Issue 4 – Up with the Birds
- Issue 5 – Upgrade
- Issue 6 – This Could Be Paradise (dedicated to the "Paradise" music video)
