= List of best-selling singles and albums of 2011 in Ireland =

This is a list of the best selling singles, and albums in Ireland in 2011, according to IRMA. Further listings can be found here.

== Top-selling singles ==
1. "Someone like You" – Adele
2. "Lipstick" – Jedward
3. "We Found Love" – Rihanna featuring Calvin Harris
4. "Party Rock Anthem" – LMFAO featuring Lauren Bennett & GoonRock
5. "Cannonball" – Little Mix
6. "On the Floor" – Jennifer Lopez featuring Pitbull
7. "Moves like Jagger" – Maroon 5 featuring Christina Aguilera
8. "Jar of Hearts" – Christina Perri
9. "Give Me Everything" – Pitbull featuring Ne-Yo, Afrojack & Nayer
10. "Price Tag" – Jessie J featuring B.o.B

== Top-selling albums ==
1. 21 – Adele
2. Christmas – Michael Bublé
3. 19 – Adele
4. Doo-Wops & Hooligans – Bruno Mars
5. Loud – Rihanna
6. Talk That Talk – Rihanna
7. Greatest Hits - Westlife
8. Up All Night – One Direction
9. Mylo Xyloto - Coldplay
10. Mayhem - Imelda May

Notes:

- *Compilation albums are not included.
