= List of number-one albums of 2011 (Netherlands) =

In 2011, 22 albums advanced to number one on the Mega Album Top 100, the official Dutch albums chart. The first album to appear on the Album Top 100 that year was Caro Emerald's Deleted Scenes from the Cutting Room Floor, the last being Christmas by Michael Bublé. Artists and bands who had an album reach number one on the chart for at least one week were Caro Emerald, Los Angeles: The Voices, Marco Borsato, Bruno Mars, Adele, BLØF, Ben Saunders, Guus Meeuwis, Anouk, Amy Winehouse, Red Hot Chili Peppers, Gerard Joling, Gordon, Rene Froger, Jeroen van der Boom, De Toppers, SuperHeavy, De Dijk, Coldplay, Frans Bauer, Snow Patrol, K3, Nick & Simon and Michael Bublé, and out of these artists, Bruno Mars, BLØF, Ben Saunders, SuperHeavy and Snow Patrol had achieved a number-one album for the first time. Adele's 21 was the best-performing album of 2011, topping the Album Top 100's 2011 year-end chart.

== Chart history ==
Key
†	Indicates best-selling album of 2011

Issue date(s)	Album	Artist(s)
1 January	Deleted Scenes from the Cutting Room Floor	Caro Emerald
8 January	Los Angeles	Los Angeles: The Voices
15 January	Dromen durven delen	Marco Borsato
29 January–26 February	21 †	Adele
5 March	Alles blijft anders	BLØF
12 March–23 April	21 †	Adele
30 April	You Thought You Knew Me By Now	Ben Saunders
7–14 May	21 †	Adele
21 May	Armen open	Guus Meeuwis
28 May	To Get Her Together	Anouk
4 June–30 July	21 †	Adele
6 August	Back To Black	Amy Winehouse
13–27 August	21 †	Adele
3 September	I'm with You	Red Hot Chili Peppers
10 September	Toppers In Concert 2011	Gerard Joling, Gordon, Rene Froger, Jeroen van der Boom and De Toppers
17 September	21 †	Adele
24 September	SuperHeavy	SuperHeavy
1 October	Scherp de zeis	De Dijk
8–22 October	21 †	Adele
29 October	Mylo Xyloto	Coldplay
5 November	Gloednieuw	Frans Bauer
12 November	Los Angeles The Voices II - Because We Believe	Los Angeles: The Voices
19 November	Fallen Empires	Snow Patrol
26 November	Eyo!	K3
3 December	Symphonica in Rosso	Nick & Simon
10 December	Lioness: Hidden Treasures	Amy Whinehouse
17–24 December	Christmas	Michael Bublé

== See also ==
- 2011 in music
