= Mylo Xyloto =

2011 studio album by Coldplay

- Standard edition cover

Studio album by Coldplay
- Released: 19 October 2011
- Recorded: November 2008 – September 2011
- Studios: The Bakery (London); The Beehive (London)
- Genres: Alternative rock; pop rock; dance-rock; new wave; electronica; pop
- Length: 44:09
- Labels: Parlophone; Capitol
- Producers: Markus Dravs; Dan Green; Rik Simpson

Coldplay chronology
LeftRightLeft; RightLeft (2009)	Mylo Xyloto (2011)	Live 2012 (2012)

Alternative cover
- Reversible artwork

Singles from Mylo Xyloto
- 1. "Every Teardrop Is a Waterfall" Released: 3 June 2011; 2. "Paradise" Released: 12 September 2011; 3. "Charlie Brown" Released: 14 November 2011; 4. "Princess of China" Released: 14 February 2012; 5. "Hurts Like Heaven" Released: 8 October 2012

Mylo Xyloto (/ˈmaɪloʊ ˈzaɪlətoʊ/ MY-loh ZY-lə-toh) is the fifth studio album by British rock band Coldplay. It was released by Parlophone on 19 October 2011 in Japan and 24 October 2011 in the rest of the world. The band worked closely with producer Brian Eno following their successful collaboration on their previous album, Viva la Vida or Death and All His Friends (2008).

Mylo Xyloto is the band's first concept album, and it also is a thematic rock opera. The album tells the story of a war against sound and colour on the planet Silencia, which has been overtaken by a totalitarian government led by Major Minus, who controls the population through media and propaganda. His aim is to take sound and colour off the streets in hope to draw away "feeders", creatures that use such energy to hunt its prey. The album follows Mylo Xyloto, a "silencer", a soldier in an army tasked to hunt and track down "sparkers", people who harness light and energy and use it to create sparks, comparable to graffiti in real life. He encounters Fly, the sparker most wanted by Major Minus. Through Fly, Mylo discovers his sparker abilities and his affiliation with the Car Kids, a major sparker faction founded by Mylo's parents, Aiko and Lela. Drummer Will Champion has noted that the album is a story of the characters "falling in love and trying to escape together", with a general theme of "love conquering all". In interviews the band have said that the album follows a love story between Mylo and Xyloto, with them being separate characters. However, in the comics based on the album, Mylo Xyloto is the main protagonist and Fly is the sparker girl he encounters.

The album received generally positive reviews from critics, who praised its uplifting tone and new electronic sound; however, some found its material bombastic and overproduced. "Paradise" and "Every Teardrop Is a Waterfall" received a total of three nominations at the 54th Annual Grammy Awards in 2012, while the album and "Charlie Brown" received two further nods in the following year. Internationally, Mylo Xyloto charted at number one in 34 countries. In the United Kingdom, Mylo Xyloto became Coldplay's fifth album to debut at number one, selling 208,343 units in its first week, and setting a one-week digital sales record with 83,000 copies sold. Mylo Xyloto broke an iTunes record for digital downloads sales by selling over 500,000 digital copies in a week. (Beyoncé's self-titled album and Adele's 25 topped this record in 2013 and 2015 respectively). Mylo Xyloto became Coldplay's third album to debut at number one on the US Billboard 200, selling 447,411 units in its first week of sales. It was the United Kingdom's best-selling rock album of 2011, moving over 908,000 copies. The album has sold more than 8 million copies worldwide.

== Background ==
In November 2008, in an interview with All Headline News, Coldplay lead singer Chris Martin stated that "I don't think bands should keep going past [the age of] 33", but later rephrased this to say that what he meant was that they must proceed "as if it's our last, because that's the only way to proceed" in December 2008, adding that he thought the band would never split. Bass guitarist Guy Berryman, who earlier wrote that the band will "just have to start work and see how it shapes up", reported that the band would return to the studio:

We've already got lists of song ideas. We never stop writing. We go into the studio with all the best laid plans then what we end up with is not what we intended. It's just exciting to wonder what will come out the speakers in a year's time. We have very exciting things lined up. It's time to take our music down different directions and really explore other avenues.

In one interview, Martin predicted the style of the incoming album as being less dominated by fanfare, and featuring a more "stripped-down" sound.

=== Studios ===
In November 2006, Coldplay established a recording HQ at a disused bakery in Primrose Hill, North London, where they recorded a big part of Viva la Vida or Death and All His Friends. Part of Mylo Xyloto was also recorded on the same place, however this time they used a new studio, near the original, called The Beehive. While a few overdubs and a lot of comping were recorded at The Bakery, a lot of live recording and live takes were done on the new studio. The Beehive was described by Rik Simpson, one of the producers, as a "large room". One of the band's roadies blogged about the studio, describing it as having a "gorgeous reverb". Still about the studio he said: "Everywhere you go there's light streaming in. Even on a relatively gloomy British afternoon, it's noticeably bright inside. I can only imagine that this will be reflected in the new material". Recording for the album was finished in September 2011.

== Style and concept ==
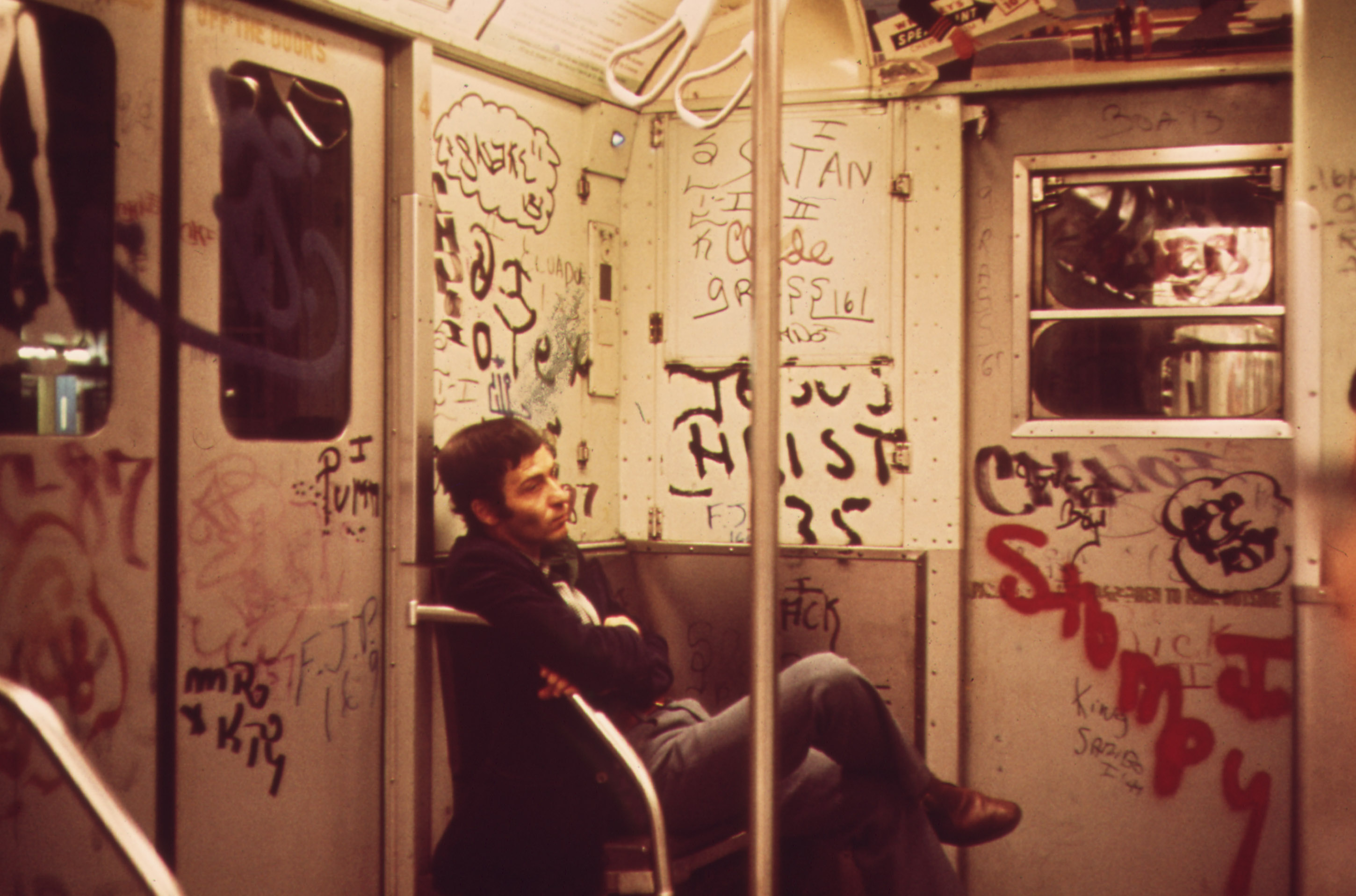
Subway car in New York City. The 1970s graffiti of the city inspired the album.

Mylo Xyloto is a concept album, according to Martin, "based on a love story with a happy ending" and has been described as alternative rock, pop, electronica, pop rock, space rock, and electronic rock. Two protagonists living in an oppressive, dystopian, urban environment, meet one another through a gang and fall in love. Lyrically, the album is inspired by "old school American graffiti" and "the White Rose Movement." Martin also said that the album was influenced by HBO TV series The Wire.

Coldplay had stated on several occasions, long before the release, that they wanted the album to be "more acoustic" and "more intimate" than its predecessor, 2008's Viva la Vida or Death and All His Friends. The band later said they got to a point where they were trying to make two records, a stripped-down album, that started to be recorded first, along with an electric one that was already being called Mylo Xyloto by the band. However, they later decided to combine both albums. Drummer Will Champion explained that the band realised they couldn't focus on more than one thing at once, and songs like "Paradise" couldn't be played in an acoustic style. Martin pointed another song as a reason too:

We have a song called Charlie Brown, which was the centrepiece of this other record we started first. We were playing the riff on an accordion and Guy came in one morning and said, 'I'm afraid I have to put my foot down. I don't want to speak out of turn, but I will not allow this song to be played on an accordion – that has to go in with the Mylo bunch'. So then we thought – let's just make one album.

In the end, some songs composed for the acoustic album such as "Us Against the World" and "U.F.O." maintained the "stripped" approach, while others such as "Charlie Brown" changed into a new form. Songs from both records ended up on the final album, worldbeat elements from the predecessor Viva la Vida are present but the overall production of it became electronic influenced. The electro-rock sound can be heard through the whole album, beginning with opening song "Hurts Like Heaven" which has synthesised sounds and vocals predominantly on vocoder. The next track, "Paradise", also shows the band stepping outside of their comfort zone and going into the new electronic territory. Additionally, this song has an R&B beat style, which is also featured on "Princess of China". This track opens with an anxious blend of synths and guitars and then goes into an R&B type beat. The album has three short instrumentals which are included as noodling experimental electronic interjections on the record.

=== Artwork ===
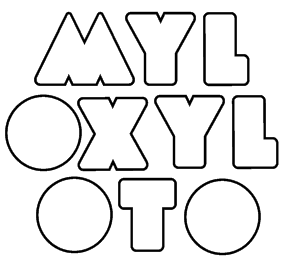
The typeface created for the album's artwork

The album's artworks were revealed on 12 August 2011, inspired on graffiti the band worked again with longtime collaborators Tappin Gofton and, this time, also with British street artist, Paris. The band had already started to research and work with graffiti on their home studios, The Bakery and The Beehive, when designer Misty Buckley introduced Paris to them, as they were looking for a graffiti artist to teach them the techniques to do it. Although initially he was supposed to be just a "teacher", Paris stayed on the project until the end, producing part of the final work along with the band.

Coldplay wanted it to be an explosion of vivid colours as a counterpoint to the subdued colour palette of Viva la Vida, and at the same time, there were many lyrics and codes they wished to add. Researches and development into street art started six months before the work had begun. Then a graffiti wall was painted by the band itself and Paris, formed by nine parts. Tappin Gofton wanted the whole evolution of the wall, so at the end of every day, many highly detailed photos would be taken of it. In the end, a picture including three parts of the wall was featured on the front cover, while the whole wall is featured on the centre of the CD's booklet.

The final versions of the covers have a picture of the wall. Half of the CDs were packed with the booklet flipped, showing the silver initials "M X" via a die-cut sheet placed over the photo on the front, while the other half was packed with the full picture and the full name of the album written over it. Both covers use an original typeface created for this work; the new font is used in most of the album's graphic promotion.

=== Title ===
Martin hinted at the album's title prior to release, saying "it will probably begin with an M." During interviews the band has already given many different reasons and meanings to the album's name. Martin also said it was reference to the album's characters, the boy (Mylo) and the girl (Xyloto) respectively. Another meaning suggested by the frontman was that the name was supposed to be a graffiti tag for the band, relating "xylophone" to the word "xyloto". Much of the art was done by Paris 1974.

== Release and promotion ==
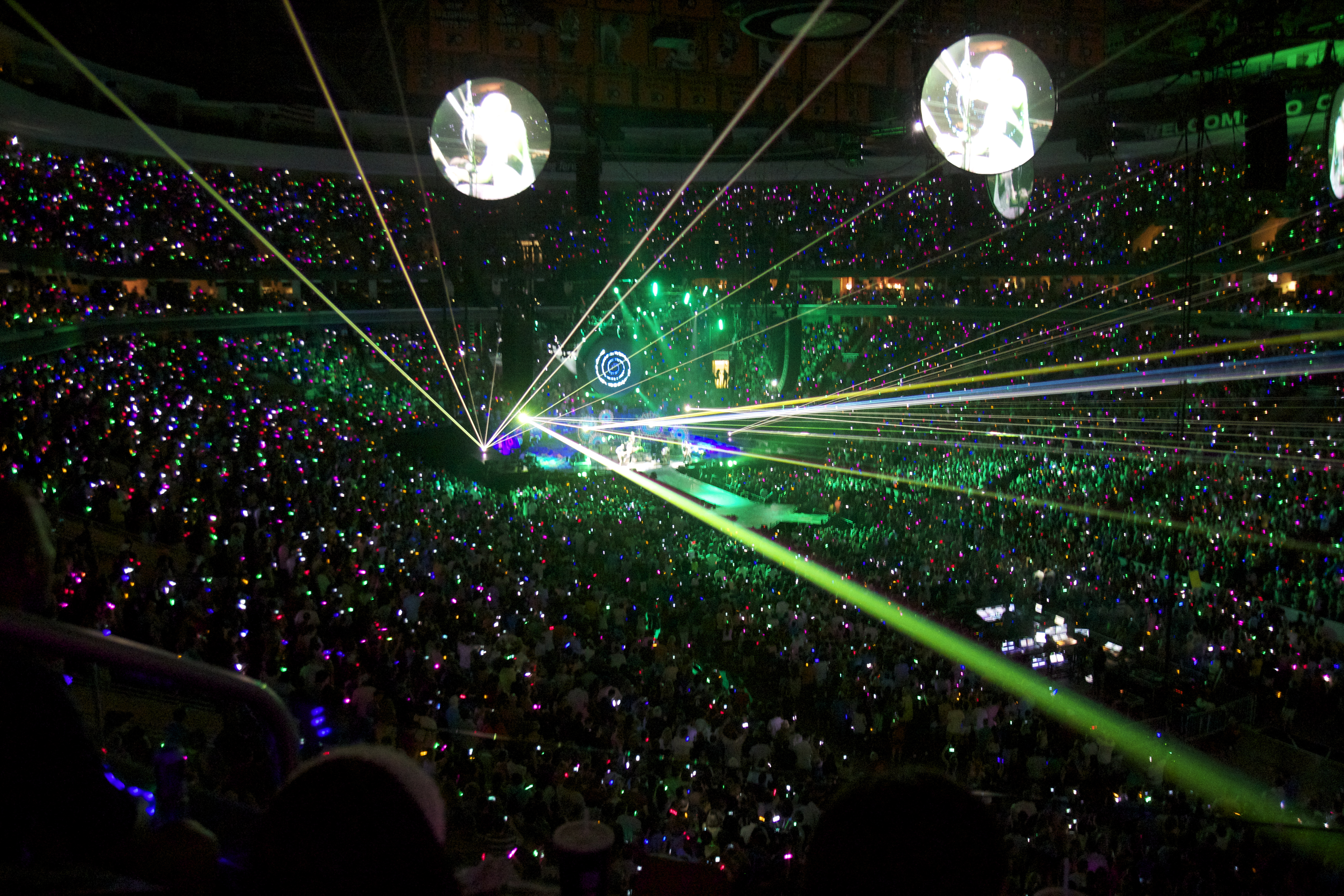
The Mylo Xyloto Tour was noted for its large scale display of pyrotechnics, laser lighting and Xylobands.

The album was originally set to be released in December 2010 as a "decade-ender", but was postponed to 2011 since the album was far from finished as Coldplay concluded their Viva la Vida Tour. Chris Martin and Jonny Buckland mentioned that the album would be released in the latter year. The iTunes Store let users hear one new song from the album every day the week before until the album was released. The album was released on 24 October 2011 on CD and on vinyl. A special edition that includes the CD, digital copy and LP disc along with copies of the band's studio notes, stencils, a poster, a pop up book and stickers was made available on 19 December 2011.

=== Singles ===
On 31 May, Coldplay announced that "Every Teardrop Is a Waterfall" would be released on 3 June at 12 pm BST via download. The single sampled "I Go to Rio", written by Peter Allen and Adrienne Anderson. On 21 June 2011, Coldplay's website announced the band would release an iTunes exclusive digital EP which additionally contained "Major Minus" and "Moving to Mars" on 26 June.

The album's second single, "Paradise", was released on 12 September 2011. That same day, Chris Martin announced that Rihanna would be featured on "Princess of China". "Paradise" reached No. 15 on the Billboard Hot 100 chart and the top 10 in 15 charts around the world. On 1 January 2012, it became the year's first number-one single in the UK and Coldplay's second chart-topper in the country. The song was also the best-selling rock single of 2011 in the United Kingdom.

"Charlie Brown" was later confirmed to be the third single from the album, and the group performed the song on 23 January 2012 on the British TV series The X Factor. On that date, it was solicited to US Triple A radio, and was solicited to US adult contemporary radio the following day. The single received a release date of 3 February in most other territories except for the United Kingdom, where the single was released 12 March 2012. "Princess of China", a collaboration with singer Rihanna, was solicited to US mainstream radio on 14 February 2012 as the album's fourth single. A digital release followed on 13 April in the United States and on 4 June in the United Kingdom. "Up with the Birds" was released as a limited edition 7" vinyl single for Record Store Day on 21 April 2012, backed by "U.F.O." as its B-side. It was limited to 500 copies in the United Kingdom and 1,000 copies in the United States. "Hurts Like Heaven" was made available as the fifth and final single on 8 October 2012 and served to promote the Mylo Xyloto comics, the band later released a limited 7" vinyl for Record Store Day|Record Store Day UK in 2013, it included a live version of "Us Against the World" as its B-side. "Up in Flames" was later launched as a promotional single in Italian radio stations on 16 November 2012 to promote Live 2012.

=== World tour ===
The promotion for Mylo Xyloto began in June with the release of the first single and the beginning of a series of performances on some of the most important festivals around the world, including Glastonbury, Lollapalooza, Fuji Rock Festival and Rock in Rio. The first time the band played live some songs from the album for a big audience was on Rock Im Park festival in Nuremberg, Germany, playing six new songs. Manager Dave Holmes said that the reason to play new songs on the festivals was to "invite people to the party" also on this he said: "...let the music do the talking, play new songs and get people talking about the fact you're playing new music."

After the "festival tour", Coldplay began the proper Mylo Xyloto Tour in October 2011 with a series of rehearsal concerts in Europe, as well as a special concert in Johannesburg, South Africa, footage of which was used in the music video for "Paradise". A full-production show began in December 2011 in the United Kingdom. For this first leg, on the end of the 2011, the stage design incorporated graffiti made by the band and the band's artist Paris, it also had a catwalk linking the main stage to a smaller stage with an "X" shape. The tour continued into 2012 with shows in Europe, North America and Australia.

=== Comic book series ===
On 10 July 2012 the Coldplay website announced a six-part Mylo Xyloto comic book series, with the first issue to be released at that week's San Diego Comic-Con. Published by Bongo Comics, the story followed the tale of Mylo, a "silencer", who, in the words of co-writer Mark Osborne, is a part of a "war against sound and colour". Together with Osborne, Dylan Haggerty writes the comic (starting in the second issue) with art by Alejandro Fuentes.

== Critical reception ==
=== Reviews ===
Professional ratings
Aggregate scores
Source	Rating
AnyDecentMusic?	6.4/10
Metacritic	65/100
Review scores
Source	Rating
AllMusic	3.5/5 stars
The A.V. Club	B
The Daily Telegraph	4/5 stars
Entertainment Weekly	C+
The Guardian	3/5 stars
NME	5/10
Pitchfork	7.0/10
Q	5/5 stars
Rolling Stone	3.5/5 stars
Spin	7/10

Mylo Xyloto received generally positive reviews from critics. On the review aggregator website Metacritic, the album has a weighted average score of 65 out of 100 based on 39 reviews, indicating "generally favorable reviews". In a five-star review, Simon Goddard of Q wrote that Mylo Xyloto "will, at the bare minimum, safely sustain their imperial position for a long time to come", singling out Martin and Buckland's musical contributions and Eno and Dravs' production for praise. Mikael Wood of Spin wrote that like Viva la Vida or Death and All His Friends, Mylo Xyloto "draws from an expansive palette that makes Coldplay's first three albums sound even quainter" and that "where Viva La Vida showcased Coldplay's sense of adventure, this [album] feels more eager to please". Citing the album the band's most ambitious effort, Josh Eells of Rolling Stone noted that "the choruses are bigger, the textures grander, the optimism more optimistic" and described it as a "bear-hug record for a bear-market world". The Daily Telegraph's Neil McCormick called the record "irresistible", noting its "adventurous" mood and "luxuriously colourful" sound. Ian Cohen of Pitchfork wrote that the album sees the band "successfully continuing to explore the tension of wanting to be one of the best bands in the world and having to settle for being one of the biggest."

In a mixed review, Alexis Petridis of The Guardian judged Mylo Xyloto's storyline as incoherent and expressed skepticism toward the album's purported pop influences, feeling that much of the album "just sounds like standard-issue Coldplay, replete with echoing guitars, woah-oh choruses and vocals that signify high drama by slipping into falsetto", apart from electronic music flourishes that "genuinely [add] a bit of freshness to a formulaic sound". In a review for Entertainment Weekly, Melissa Maerz interpreted the album as an attempt by the group to sound less like themselves to reconcile their commercial success with the supposed stigma of being "as hated as a band can be". Randall Roberts of the Los Angeles Times was critical of Martin's lyrics, stating that "every touch of lyrical bitterness is followed by enough sugar to mask the taste, which might be good in the short term but isn't a recipe for long-term health."

AllMusic editor Stephen Thomas Erlewine wrote that Mylo Xyloto "has a leg up other Coldplay records for this simple reason: they're no longer attempting to mimic U2's portentous piety. They've embraced their schoolboy selves and are simply singing songs of love and good cheer, albeit on a grand scale that somehow seems smaller due to the group's insuppressible niceness." Melodic magazine's critic Johan Wippsson cited "Paradise" and "Charlie Brown" as examples of the band sounding "really on their 'own'", compared to past efforts where the band has "taken ideas from others and sometimes a little too clearly".

=== Rankings ===
List of critic rankings
Publication	Year	Description	Result	Ref.
BBC Radio Scotland	2011	Edith Bowman's Best Albums of 2011	Placed	
Blitz	2011	Best International Albums of 2011	26	
The Fly	2011	The Top 50 Albums of 2011	42	
Gigwise	2011	Top 50 Albums of 2011	15	
Q	2011	50 Albums of the Year – 2011	5	
Q	2016	The Greatest Albums of the Last 30 Years	Placed	
Radio X	2023	The 25 Best Albums of 2011	24	
Spin	2011	20 Best Pop Albums of 2011	8	
Sputnikmusic	2011	Staff's Top 50 Albums of 2011	43	
The Sun	2011	Best Albums of 2011	1	
The Wall Street Journal	2011	The Best Music of 2011	5	

== Accolades ==
List of awards and nominations
Year	Ceremony	Category	Result	Ref.
2011	Bizarre Awards	Best Album	Nominated	
2011	Gaffa Awards (Denmark)	International Album of the Year	Nominated	
2011	Guinness World Records	Fastest-Selling Digital Album in the UK	Broken	
2012	BBC Radio 1 Teen Awards	Best British Album	Nominated	
2012	Billboard Music Awards	Top Rock Album	Won	
2012	Billboard Music Awards	Top Alternative Album	Won	
2012	Brit Awards	British Album of the Year	Nominated	
2012	Danish Music Awards	International Album of the Year	Nominated	
2012	Fryderyk Awards	Best Foreign Album	Nominated	
2012	Juno Awards	International Album of the Year	Nominated	
2012	Los 40 Music Awards	Best International Album	Nominated	
2012	MTV Video Music Awards Japan	Best Album of the Year	Nominated	
2012	NME Awards	Worst Album	Nominated	
2012	Porin Awards	Best International Album	Nominated	
2012	Rockol Awards	Best International Album	Silver	
2012	Swiss Music Awards	Best Pop/Rock International Album	Nominated	
2012	Žebřík Music Awards	Best Foreign Album	3rd place	
2013	Grammy Awards	Best Rock Album	Nominated	
2013	TEC Awards	Record Production / Album	Nominated	

== Legacy ==
On 24 October 2021, the tenth anniversary of the album's release, Coldplay announced on Twitter that Paris, the album's art director, had created a "special piece" to celebrate the occasion: a wall adorned with artwork reminiscent of the Mylo Xyloto era, along with a vinyl copy of the album and a programme from the Mylo Xyloto Tour. The fictional universe created for the record has gone on to inspire Coldplay's own Music of the Spheres (2021), with creative director Phil Harvey calling it "a development from the Mylo Xyloto universe, and there's even a couple of specific references to it". One of these references was the appearance of the "silencers" from Silencia in music video for "My Universe".

== Commercial performance ==
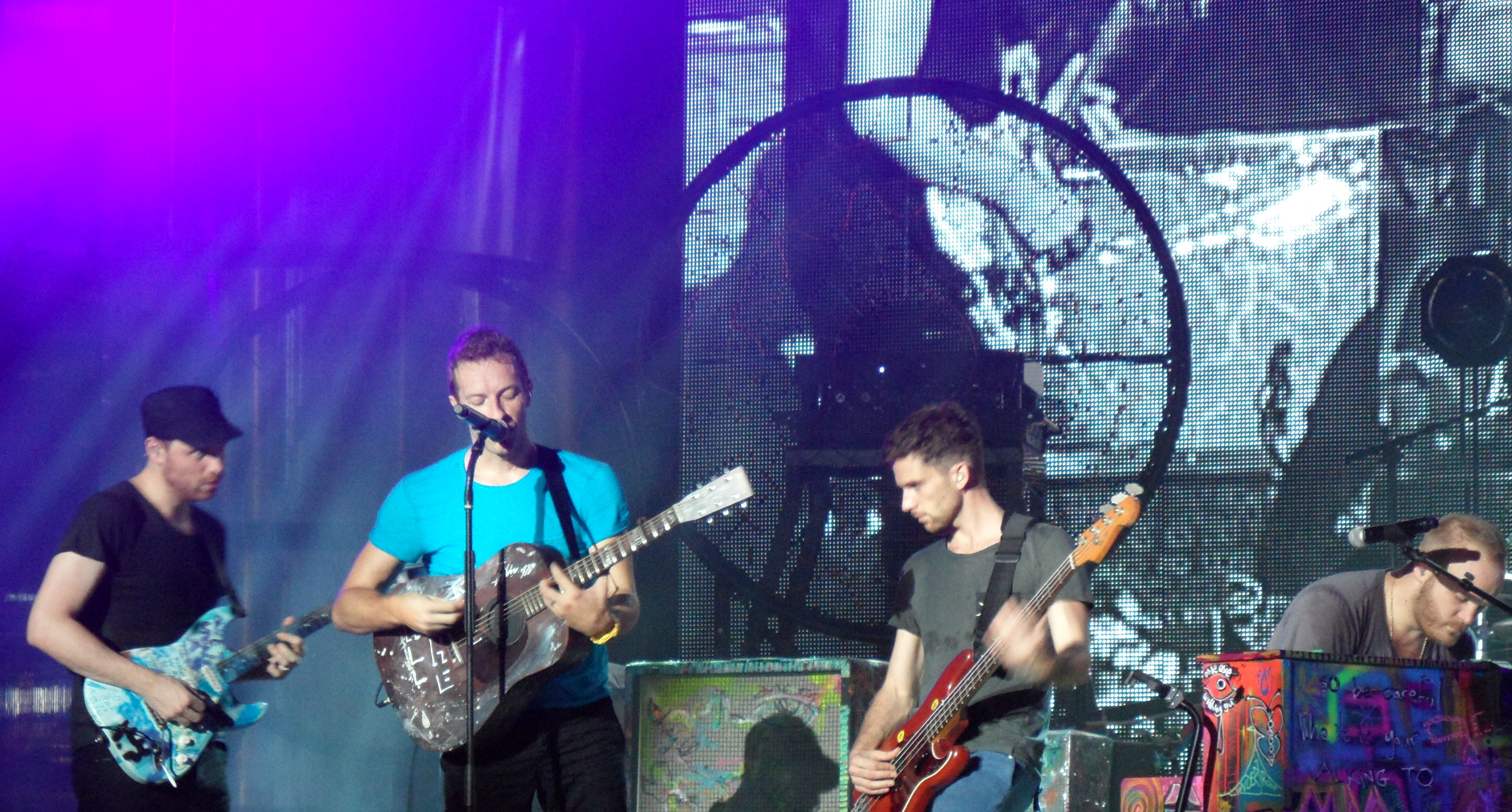
Coldplay performing in Toronto for MuchMusic in September 2011

Mylo Xyloto reached number one in 34 countries, selling over 1.1 million copies in its first week worldwide. It also led the charts in all 35 territories covered by iTunes, breaking the weekly sales record on the platform by shifting more than 500,000 units. Coldplay had the best-selling album of the year by a group as a result. In the United Kingdom, they moved 122,000 copies in three days and 208,343 in seven, debuting at number one with the second-highest first-week sales of the year, following Lady Gaga's Born This Way.

Coldplay became the third band in UK Albums Chart history to top the ranking with their first five albums, after the Beatles and Oasis. The downloads accounted for 83,000 units to become the first album to sell more than 80,000 digital copies in one week, a record previously held by Take That's Progress. In its second week on the chart, the album fell to number two selling 67,132 copies. It was the best-selling rock album in the United Kingdom, selling over 908,000 copies. The album's second single, "Paradise" became the best-selling rock single in the UK, shifting more than 410,000 copies.

In the United States, Mylo Xyloto debuted atop the Billboard 200 on 12 November 2012 with first-week sales of 447,411 copies, making Coldplay the fifth rock band in Nielsen SoundScan history to open with 400,000 copies on three or more albums, after U2, The Beatles, Dave Matthews Band and Metallica. In Canada, the album debuted at number one on the Canadian Albums Chart, selling 65,000 copies in its first week. In Australia, it debuted at number one with 35,000 copies sold. In France, Mylo Xyloto shifted 57,000 copies upon release. In Denmark, the album debuted at number two with first-week sales of 7,807 copies. It was certified platinum by the International Federation of the Phonographic Industry (IFPI) for shipments of 20,000 copies in its first week. In Japan, Mylo Xyloto debuted at number three with 28,049 copies sold. All tracks from the album entered the International Gaon Chart simultaneously in South Korea. As of April 2014, it has sold 1,581,000 copies in the United States.

== Track listing ==
All tracks are written by Coldplay and Brian Eno, with production from Rik Simpson, Markus Dravs and Dan Green, except where noted.

Mylo Xyloto – standard edition track listing
No.	Title	Writer(s)	Producer(s)	Length
1.	"Mylo Xyloto"			0:43
2.	"Hurts Like Heaven"			4:02
3.	"Paradise"			4:37
4.	"Charlie Brown"			4:45
5.	"Us Against the World"			3:59
6.	"M.M.I.X."			0:48
7.	"Every Teardrop Is a Waterfall"	Coldplay; Eno; Peter Allen; Adrienne Anderson; Harry Castioni; Alex Christensen; Alberto Hauss; Jeff Wycombe		4:00
8.	"Major Minus"			3:30
9.	"U.F.O."			2:17
10.	"Princess of China" (with Rihanna)	Coldplay; Eno; Jón Þór Birgisson; Orri Páll Dýrason; Georg Hólm; Kjartan Sveinsson	Simpson; Dravs; Green; Ken Thomas; Kuk Harrell	3:59
11.	"Up in Flames"	Coldplay		3:13
12.	"A Hopeful Transmission"			0:33
13.	"Don't Let It Break Your Heart"	Coldplay		3:53
14.	"Up with the Birds"	Coldplay; Eno; Leonard Cohen		3:47
Total length:				44:09

Mylo Xyloto – Japanese edition bonus tracks^{[a]}
No.	Title	Writer(s)	Producer(s)	Length
15.	"Charlie Brown"			4:48
16.	"Life Is for Living"	Coldplay	Ken Nelson	2:30
17.	"Every Teardrop Is a Waterfall"	Coldplay; Eno; Allen; Anderson; Castioni; Christensen; Lagonda; Wycombe		4:38
Total length:				56:05

Notes

- ^{^a} All tracks are live performances from the 2011 Glastonbury Festival.

Sample credits

- "Every Teardrop Is a Waterfall" contains a sample of "Ritmo de la noche" (written by Alex Christensen, Harry Castioni, Bela Lagonda and Jeff Wycombe) which itself contains a sample of "I Go to Rio" (written by Peter Allen and Adrienne Anderson).
- "Princess of China" contains a sample of "Takk..." (written by Jón Þór Birgisson, Orri Páll Dýrason, Georg Hólm and Kjartan Sveinsson).
- "Up with the Birds" contains a sample of "Anthem" (written by Leonard Cohen) and "Driven by You" (written by Brian May).

== Personnel ==
Coldplay

- Chris Martin – lead vocals, keyboards, acoustic guitar, piano, rhythm guitar (track 13)
- Guy Berryman – bass guitar, keyboards, backing vocals
- Jonny Buckland – electric guitar, keyboards, backing vocals
- Will Champion – drums, acoustic guitar (track 7), percussion, piano (track 5), backing vocals, electronic drums (tracks 10 & 11)
- Phil Harvey

Additional personnel

- Markus Dravs – producer, recording
- Dan Green – producer, mixer, recording
- Rik Simpson – producer, mixer, recording
- Brian Eno – "enoxification" (Note: A term coined by the band to describe Eno's contribution to the record. According to Martin: "It's a description of how he fits into the process. It isn't producing – it's his own weird thing".) and additional composition
- Rihanna – guest vocals on "Princess of China"
- Juanita Stein – backing vocals on "Up with the Birds"
- Andrew Thurston – cowbell on "Up with the Birds"
- Spike Stent – mixer
- Michael Brauer – mixer
- Davide Rossi – strings
- Jon Hopkins – light and magic, keyboards
- Rosie Danvers – additional cello
- Luis Jardim – in time percussion
- Robin Baynton – recording
- Marcos Tovar – recording
- Ted Jensen – mastering
- Bob Ludwig – mastering
- Coldplay, Paris – artwork
- Tappin Gofton – design, art direction
- Andy Rugg – recording and mix assistance
- Matt McGinn – recording and mix assistance
- Matt Miller – recording and mix assistance
- Christian Green – recording and mix assistance
- Olga Fitzroy – recording and mix assistance
- Ryan Gilligan – recording and mix assistance
- Matt Green – recording and mix assistance
- Pierre Eiras – recording and mix assistance
- David Emery – recording and mix assistance
- Ian Sylvester – recording and mix assistance
- Noah Goldstein – recording and mix assistance
- Ian Shea – recording and mix assistance
- Andrew Denny – recording and mix assistance
- Deepu Panjwani – recording and mix assistance
- Nobuyuki Murakami – recording and mix assistance
- Hidefumi Ohbuchi – recording and mix assistance
- Tim Crompton – recording and mix assistance

== Charts ==
=== Weekly charts ===
Weekly chart performance
Chart (2011–2017)	Peak position
Argentine Albums (CAPIF)	1
Australian Albums (ARIA)	1
Austrian Albums (Ö3 Austria)	2
Belgian Albums (Ultratop Flanders)	1
Belgian Albums (Ultratop Wallonia)	1
Brazilian Albums (ABPD)	1
Canadian Albums (Billboard)	1
Croatian International Albums (HDU)	1
Czech Albums (ČNS IFPI)	2
Danish Albums (Hitlisten)	2
Dutch Albums (Album Top 100)	1
Estonian Albums (IFPI)	1
Finnish Albums (Suomen virallinen lista)	2
French Albums (SNEP)	1
German Albums (Offizielle Top 100)	1
Greek Albums (IFPI Greece)	2
Hungarian Albums (MAHASZ)	7
Icelandic Albums (Tónlistinn)	5
Irish Albums (IRMA)	1
Italian Albums (FIMI)	1
Japanese Albums (Oricon)	3
Japanese Top Albums Sales (Billboard Japan)	3
Mexican Albums (Top 100 Mexico)	1
New Zealand Albums (RMNZ)	1
Norwegian Albums (VG-lista)	1
Polish Albums (ZPAV)	1
Portuguese Albums (AFP)	1
Russian Albums (2M)	15
Scottish Albums (Official Charts)	1
Slovak Albums (ČNS IFPI)	49
South African Albums (RISA)	2
South Korean Albums (Gaon)	8
South Korean International Albums (Gaon)	1
Spanish Albums (Promusicae)	3
Swedish Albums (Sverigetopplistan)	1
Swiss Albums (Schweizer Hitparade)	1
Taiwanese Albums (Five Music)	1
UK Albums (Official Charts)	1
US Billboard 200	1
US Top Rock & Alternative Albums (Billboard)	1

=== Monthly charts ===
Monthly chart performance
Chart (2011–2012)	Peak position
Japanese Albums (Oricon)	9
South Korean Albums (Gaon)	26
South Korean International Albums (Gaon)	2
Uruguayan Albums (CUD)	20

=== Year-end charts ===
Year-end chart performance
Chart (2011)	Position
Argentine Albums (CAPIF)	9
Australian Albums (ARIA)	10
Austrian Albums (Ö3 Austria)	23
Belgian Albums (Ultratop Flanders)	7
Belgian Alternative Albums (Ultratop Flanders)	5
Belgian Albums (Ultratop Wallonia)	19
Canadian Albums (Billboard)	18
Czech Albums (ČNS IFPI)	4
Danish Albums (Hitlisten)	13
Dutch Albums (Album Top 100)	3
Finnish Albums (Suomen viralinen lista)	3
French Albums (SNEP)	7
German Albums (Offizielle Top 100)	13
Hungarian Albums (MAHASZ)	87
Icelandic Albums (Tónlistinn)	69
Irish Albums (IRMA)	12
Italian Albums (FIMI)	9
Japanese Albums (Oricon)	84
Mexican Albums (Top 100 Mexico)	36
New Zealand Albums (RMNZ)	11
Norwegian Albums (VG-lista)	6
Polish Albums (ZPAV)	62
South Korean International Albums (Gaon)	14
Spanish Albums (Promusicae)	14
Swedish Albums (Sverigetopplistan)	12
Swedish Albums & Compilations (Sverigetopplistan)	19
Swiss Albums (Schweizer Hitparade)	3
UK Albums (OCC)	5
US Billboard 200	35
US Top Rock Albums (Billboard)	3
Worldwide Albums (IFPI)	4

Chart (2012)	Position
Argentine Albums (CAPIF)	79
Australian Albums (ARIA)	21
Austrian Albums (Ö3 Austria)	44
Belgian Midprice Albums (Ultratop Flanders)	2
Belgian Midprice Albums (Ultratop Wallonia)	4
Canadian Albums (Billboard)	15
Danish Albums (Hitlisten)	20
Dutch Albums (Album Top 100)	47
European Albums (IFPI)	2
French Albums (SNEP)	29
German Albums (Offizielle Top 100)	72
Italian Albums (FIMI)	19
Mexican Albums (Top 100 Mexico)	60
New Zealand Albums (RMNZ)	17
Portuguese Albums (AFP)	9
South Korean International Albums (Gaon)	68
Spanish Albums (Promusicae)	18
Swedish Albums (Sverigetopplistan)	88
Swiss Albums (Schweizer Hitparade)	20
UK Albums (OCC)	9
US Billboard 200	17
US Alternative Albums (Billboard)	4
US Digital Albums (Billboard)	7
US Top Rock Albums (Billboard)	4
Worldwide Albums (IFPI)	31

Chart (2013)	Position
Belgian Midprice Albums (Ultratop Flanders)	41
Belgian Midprice Albums (Ultratop Wallonia)	21
UK Albums (OCC)	160

=== Decade-end charts ===
Decade-end chart performance
Chart (2010–2019)	Position
Australian Albums (ARIA)	34
Dutch Albums (Album Top 100)	76
Norwegian Albums (VG-lista)	18
UK Albums (OCC)	17
US Billboard 200	129
US Top Rock Albums (Billboard)	37

== Certifications and sales ==
Certifications and sales
Region	Certification	Certified units/sales
Australia (ARIA)	2× Platinum	140,000^{^}
Austria (IFPI Austria)	Gold	10,000^{*}
Belgium (BRMA)	Platinum	30,000^{*}
Canada (Music Canada)	3× Platinum	240,000^{^}
Chile (IFPI Chile)	Gold	7,500 (Note: Chilean certified sales for Mylo Xyloto as of December 2011.)
Colombia (ASINCOL)	Platinum	10,000 (Note: Colombian certified sales for Mylo Xyloto as of November 2011.)
Denmark (IFPI Danmark)	3× Platinum	60,000^{‡}
Finland (Musiikkituottajat)	Platinum	21,028 (Note: Finnish total sales for Mylo Xyloto as of December 2011.)
France (SNEP)	3× Platinum	415,000 (Note: French total sales for Mylo Xyloto as of January 2015.)
Germany (BVMI)	2× Platinum	400,000^{‡}
Ireland (IRMA)	2× Platinum	30,000^{^}
Italy (FIMI)	4× Platinum	200,000^{‡}
Japan (RIAJ)	Gold	107,828 (Note: Japanese physical sales for Mylo Xyloto as of August 2012.)
Mexico (AMPROFON)	Platinum	60,000^{^}
Netherlands (NVPI)	2× Platinum	100,000^{^}
New Zealand (RMNZ)	3× Platinum	45,000^{‡}
Norway (IFPI Norway)	Platinum	30,000^{*}
Portugal (AFP)	2× Platinum	30,000^{^}
South Korea	—	8,102 (Note: South Korean year-end physical sales for Mylo Xyloto in 2011 and 2012.)
Spain (Promusicae)	2× Platinum	120,000^{^}
Sweden (GLF)	Platinum	40,000^{‡}
Switzerland (IFPI Switzerland)	2× Platinum	60,000^{^}
United Kingdom (BPI)	5× Platinum	1,732,781 (Note: British total sales for Mylo Xyloto as of September 2026.)
United States (RIAA)	Platinum	1,000,000^{^}
Summaries
Europe (IFPI)	3× Platinum	3,000,000^{*}
^{*} Sales figures based on certification alone.^{^} Shipments figures based on certification alone.^{‡} Sales+streaming figures based on certification alone.

== Release history ==
Release history and formats
Region	Date	Format	Version	Label	Ref.
Japan	19 October 2011	CD · LP · digital download	Standard	Parlophone · Capitol · EMI	
Australia	21 October 2011	CD · LP · digital download	Standard	Parlophone · Capitol · EMI	
Various	24 October 2011	CD · LP · digital download	Standard	Parlophone · Capitol · EMI	
United States	25 October 2011	CD · LP · digital download	Standard	Parlophone · Capitol · EMI	
Colombia	9 November 2011	CD	Standard	Parlophone · Capitol · EMI	
Various	19 December 2011	CD · LP · digital download	Pop-Up	Parlophone · Capitol · EMI	
Various	1 February 2012	Streaming	Standard	Parlophone · Capitol · EMI	

== See also ==
- 2011 in British music
- List of best-selling albums of the 2010s in the United Kingdom
- List of best-selling albums of 2011 in Ireland
- List of number-one albums in Norway
- List of Billboard 200 number-one albums of 2011
- List of number-one albums of 2011 (Australia)
- List of number-one albums of 2011 (Canada)
- List of number-one albums of 2011 (Ireland)
- List of number-one albums of 2011 (Mexico)
- List of number-one albums of 2011 (Netherlands)
- List of number-one albums of 2011 (Poland)
- List of number-one albums of 2011 (Portugal)
- List of number-one hits of 2011 (France)
- List of number-one hits of 2011 (Germany)
- List of number-one hits of 2011 (Italy)
- List of number-one hits of 2011 (Sweden)
- List of number-one hits of 2011 (Switzerland)
- List of number-one albums from the 2010s (New Zealand)
- List of UK Albums Chart number ones of the 2010s
