= Mylo Xyloto Tour =

2011–2012 concert tour by Coldplay

- Tour by Coldplay
- Promotional poster
- Location: Asia; Europe; North America; Oceania
- Associated album: Mylo Xyloto
- Start date: 3 December 2011
- End date: 31 December 2012
- No. of shows: 75
- Producer: Live Nation
- Attendance: 2.1 million
- Box office: $181.3 million (Note: $254.25 million in 2025 dollars.)
- Website: coldplay.com/live

Coldplay concert chronology
- Viva la Vida Tour (2008–2010); Mylo Xyloto Tour (2011–2012); Ghost Stories Tour (2014)

The Mylo Xyloto Tour was the fifth concert tour undertaken by British rock band Coldplay. It was announced in support of their fifth album, Mylo Xyloto (2011), continuing their progression from arenas to stadiums after the Viva la Vida Tour (2008–2010). The concert run featured 76 shows across four continents, starting at Glasgow's SEC Centre on 3 December 2011 and ending at New York City's Barclays Center on 31 December 2012. A visit to Latin America was originally set for 2013, later being cancelled.

Prior to the tour, the band embarked on a series of promotional and festival performances, including Austin City Limits, Glastonbury, Lollapalooza, and Rock in Rio. Coldplay held concerts in Cape Town and Johannesburg as well. They became the first musicians to make use of LED wristbands at shows, popularising them in the live music industry. According to Pollstar, the tour grossed over $181.3 million from 2.1 million tickets sold across 75 reported dates.

== Background ==
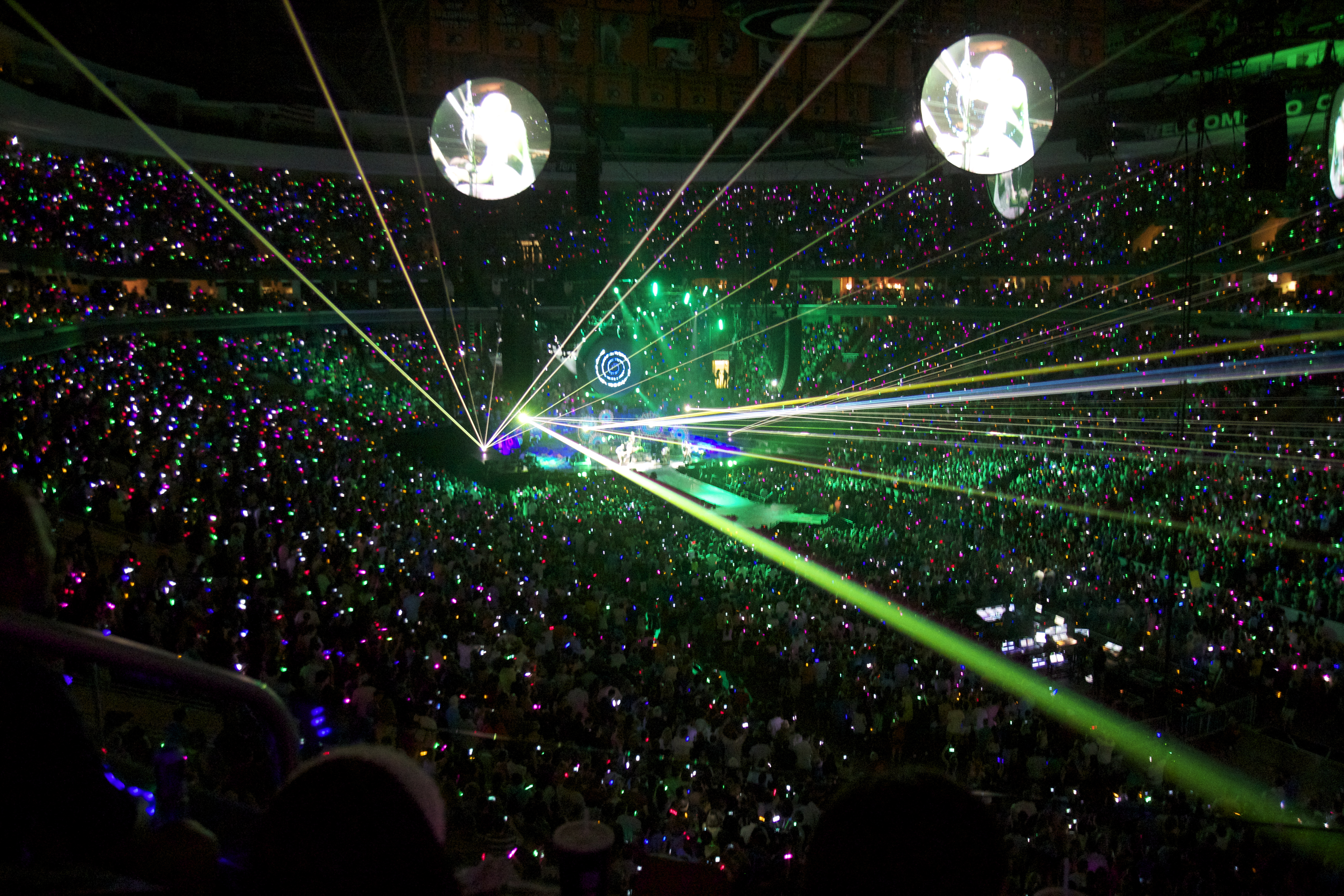
The visuals were centered in the Xylobands and laser lighting displays.

After devoting the summer of 2011 to a promotional tour in Europe, the Americas and Africa, Coldplay announced the tour on their Twitter account in September 2011. Initial dates revealed shows in the United Kingdom, France, Germany and Belgium. A set of rehearsal concerts were added for October and November, seeing the band partake in radio festivals and fan-exclusive gigs. Later, in November, extra dates were scheduled at stadiums across the United Kingdom for June 2012. The shows at Coventry's Ricoh Arena, Manchester's Etihad Stadium, Sunderland's Stadium of Light and London's Emirates Stadiumsold out in two hours. The tour kicked off with a live-streamed concert in Madrid. Each member of the band received £10.2 million after tax from the £118.4 million made.

== Broadcasts and recordings ==
Prior to the tour, the band gave a promotional concert in Madrid which was streamed live on YouTube (as part of the Unstaged series). The band performed songs from Mylo Xyloto alongside their previous hits. The concert streamed on 26 October 2011. The show was not only streamed on YouTube but was also seen in New York City's Times Square. Internet users were able to view exclusive content, including a pre-show interview and footage from the band's soundcheck, and were also able to select their camera view, spanning from "front of stage" to "aerial". The show was directed by Anton Corbijn and presented by American Express. The live webcast was reported to have been viewed by 20 million people. The 1 June concert at London's Emirates Stadium was broadcast on Absolute Radio. Titled Coldplay: Live at the Emirates, the full show was aired live and uninterrupted. Before the concert aired, DJ Geoff Lloyd hosted a "Coldplay Hometime Special". The programme featured interviews with the band, alongside the band's hits.

== Commercial performance ==
According to Pollstar, Coldplay grossed $181.3 million from 2.1 million tickets sold in 75 reported dates. More than $170 million came from the performances in 2012, which made the band rank at number four among the most successful tours of the year. They also became the first act to perform at London's Emirates Stadium three times on a single tour, earning $14.4 million from 173,596 tickets. It was the group's most successful boxscore engagement at the time, both in revenue and attendance.

== Legacy ==
The Mylo Xyloto Tour was the first to make use of LED wristbands, with Coldplay being widely credited with popularising the feature. The concert at Mount Smart Stadium on 10 November 2012 had an economic impact of $2.5 million on Auckland's economy.

== Accolades ==
List of awards and nominations
Year	Ceremony	Category	Result	Ref.
2012	Live UK Music Business Awards (Note: The Live UK Music Business Awards was established in 2010 to honour excellence in live entertainment based on a peer-voted selection process.)	Spectacle of the Year	Runner-up	
2012	Parnelli Awards	Lighting Designer (Paul Normandale)	Nominated	
2012	Parnelli Awards	Video Director (Andy Bramley)	Nominated	
2012	Parnelli Awards	Production Manager (Bill Leabody)	Nominated	
2012	Parnelli Awards	Tour Manager (Marguerite Nguyen)	Won	
2013	Helpmann Awards	Best International Contemporary Concert	Nominated	
2013	Pollstar Awards	Major Tour of the Year	Nominated	
2013	Pollstar Awards	Most Creative Stage Production	Nominated	

== Set list ==
This set list was taken from the 1 June 2012 concert in London, England. It does not represent all shows throughout the tour.

Main stage

1. "Back to the Future" (from Back to the Future)
2. "Mylo Xyloto"
3. "Hurts Like Heaven"
4. "In My Place"
5. "Major Minus"
6. "Lovers in Japan"
7. "The Scientist"
8. "Yellow"
9. "Violet Hill"
10. "God Put a Smile upon Your Face"

B-stage

11. "Princess of China"
12. "Up in Flames"
13. "Warning Sign"

Main stage

14. "A Hopeful Transmission"
15. "Don't Let It Break Your Heart"
16. "Viva la Vida"
17. "Charlie Brown"
18. "Paradise"
19. "Us Against the World"
20. "Speed of Sound"
21. "Clocks"
22. "Fix You"
23. "M.M.I.X."
24. "Every Teardrop Is a Waterfall"

== Tour dates ==
List of 2011 concerts
Date (2011)	City	Country	Venue	Opening acts	Attendance	Revenue
3 December	Glasgow	Scotland	SEC Centre	Emeli Sandé	9,243 / 9,654	$779,077
4 December	Manchester	England	Manchester Evening News Arena	Marina	18,103 / 18,305	$1,534,300
9 December	London	England	The O2 Arena	Emeli Sandé	16,632 / 16,800	$1,437,086
14 December	Paris	France	Bercy Arena	Emeli Sandé	16,500 / 17,000	$1,170,338
15 December	Cologne	Germany	Lanxess Arena	Emeli Sandé	16,139 / 16,139	$1,187,492
17 December	Rotterdam	Netherlands	Ahoy Rotterdam	Emeli Sandé	7,799 / 7,799	$446,087
18 December	Antwerp	Belgium	Sportpaleis	Emeli Sandé	18,340 / 18,340	$1,516,405
20 December	Frankfurt	Germany	Festhalle	Emeli Sandé	15,148 / 15,148	$1,179,503
21 December	Berlin	Germany	O2 World	Emeli Sandé	14,623 / 14,623	$1,146,062

List of 2012 concerts
Date (2012)	City	Country	Venue	Opening acts	Attendance	Revenue
17 April	Edmonton	Canada	Rexall Place	Metronomy; The Pierces	14,306 / 16,238	$1,221,743
18 April	Calgary	Canada	Scotiabank Saddledome	Metronomy; The Pierces	14,463 / 14,463	$1,273,387
20 April	Vancouver	Canada	Rogers Arena	Metronomy; The Pierces	31,766 / 34,000	$2,774,380
21 April	Vancouver	Canada	Rogers Arena	City and Colour; The Pierces	31,766 / 34,000	$2,774,380
24 April	Portland	United States	Rose Garden	Metronomy; The Pierces	12,966 / 12,966	$1,076,567
25 April	Seattle	United States	KeyArena	Metronomy; The Pierces	14,244 / 14,244	$1,209,544
27 April	San Jose	United States	HP Pavilion	Metronomy; The Pierces	33,894 / 33,894	$2,612,395
28 April	San Jose	United States	HP Pavilion	Metronomy; The Pierces	33,894 / 33,894	$2,612,395
1 May	Los Angeles	United States	Hollywood Bowl	Metronomy; The Pierces	49,466 / 49,466	$4,158,205
2 May	Los Angeles	United States	Hollywood Bowl	Metronomy; The Pierces	49,466 / 49,466	$4,158,205
4 May	Los Angeles	United States	Hollywood Bowl	Metronomy; The Pierces	49,466 / 49,466	$4,158,205
18 May	Porto	Portugal	Estádio do Dragão	Marina; Rita Ora	52,457 / 52,457	$4,631,908
20 May	Madrid	Spain	Vicente Calderón Stadium	Marina; Rita Ora	50,873 / 50,873	$3,820,451
22 May	Nice	France	Stade Charles-Ehrmann	Marina; Rita Ora	43,364 / 43,364	$2,902,592
24 May	Turin	Italy	Stadio Olimpico Grande Torino	Marina; Rita Ora	39,778 / 39,778	$2,752,188
26 May	Zürich	Switzerland	Letzigrund	Marina; Rita Ora	48,826 / 48,826	$6,389,495
29 May	Coventry	England	Ricoh Arena	Robyn; Rita Ora	40,498 / 40,498	$3,609,630
1 June	London	England	Emirates Stadium	Marina; Ash	173,596 / 173,596	$14,421,506
2 June	London	England	Emirates Stadium	Robyn; Rita Ora	173,596 / 173,596	$14,421,506
4 June	London	England	Emirates Stadium	Robyn; Rita Ora	173,596 / 173,596	$14,421,506
7 June	Sunderland	England	Stadium of Light	Robyn; Rita Ora	52,320 / 52,320	$4,331,891
9 June	Manchester	England	Etihad Stadium	Robyn; Charli XCX	113,256 / 113,256	$9,082,660
10 June	Manchester	England	Etihad Stadium	Robyn; Rita Ora	113,256 / 113,256	$9,082,660
22 June	Dallas	United States	American Airlines Center	Robyn; Wolf Gang	33,532 / 33,532	$2,581,064
23 June	Dallas	United States	American Airlines Center	Robyn; Wolf Gang	33,532 / 33,532	$2,581,064
25 June	Houston	United States	Toyota Center	Robyn; Wolf Gang	26,763 / 26,763	$2,237,219
26 June	Houston	United States	Toyota Center	Robyn; Wolf Gang	26,763 / 26,763	$2,237,219
28 June	Tampa	United States	St. Pete Times Forum	Robyn; Wolf Gang	15,934 / 16,830	$1,205,475
29 June	Miami	United States	American Airlines Arena	Robyn; Wolf Gang	18,266 / 18,266	$1,314,147
2 July	Atlanta	United States	Philips Arena	Robyn; Wolf Gang	17,218 / 17,218	$1,220,718
3 July	Charlotte	United States	Time Warner Cable Arena	Robyn; Wolf Gang	15,509 / 15,509	$1,230,556
5 July	Philadelphia	United States	Wells Fargo Center	Robyn; Wolf Gang	33,680 / 33,680	$2,745,129
6 July	Philadelphia	United States	Wells Fargo Center	Robyn; Wolf Gang	33,680 / 33,680	$2,745,129
8 July	Washington, D.C.	United States	Verizon Center	Robyn; Wolf Gang	32,666 / 32,666	$2,710,116
9 July	Washington, D.C.	United States	Verizon Center	Robyn; Wolf Gang	32,666 / 32,666	$2,710,116
23 July	Toronto	Canada	Air Canada Centre	Marina; Emeli Sandé	35,434 / 35,434	$3,371,995
24 July	Toronto	Canada	Air Canada Centre	Marina; Emeli Sandé	35,434 / 35,434	$3,371,995
26 July	Montreal	Canada	Bell Centre	Marina; Charli XCX	36,893 / 36,893	$3,211,762
27 July	Montreal	Canada	Bell Centre	Marina; Charli XCX	36,893 / 36,893	$3,211,762
29 July	Boston	United States	TD Garden	Marina; Emeli Sandé	32,248 / 32,248	$2,744,129
30 July	Boston	United States	TD Garden	Marina; Emeli Sandé	32,248 / 32,248	$2,744,129
1 August	Auburn Hills (Note: Labelled as Detroit in promotional material.)	United States	The Palace of Auburn Hills	Marina; Emeli Sandé	15,401 / 15,401	$1,185,387
3 August	East Rutherford	United States	Izod Center	Marina; Emeli Sandé	37,225 / 37,225	$3,286,692
4 August	East Rutherford	United States	Izod Center	Marina; Emeli Sandé	37,225 / 37,225	$3,286,692
7 August	Chicago	United States	United Center	Marina; Charli XCX	33,995 / 33,995	$2,893,220
8 August	Chicago	United States	United Center	Marina; Charli XCX	33,995 / 33,995	$2,893,220
10 August	Saint Paul	United States	Xcel Energy Center	Marina; Charli XCX	28,257 / 33,666	$2,472,728
11 August	Saint Paul	United States	Xcel Energy Center	Marina; Charli XCX	28,257 / 33,666	$2,472,728
28 August	Copenhagen	Denmark	Telia Parken	Marina; Charli XCX	50,595 / 50,595	$3,642,345
30 August	Stockholm	Sweden	Stockholm Olympic Stadium	Marina; Charli XCX	33,801 / 33,801	$3,044,876
2 September	Saint-Denis (Note: Labelled as Paris in promotional material.)	France	Stade de France	Marina; Charli XCX	77,813 / 77,813	$6,346,611
4 September	Cologne	Germany	RheinEnergieStadion	Marina; Charli XCX	43,952 / 43,952	$3,358,278
6 September	The Hague	Netherlands	Malieveld	Marina; Charli XCX	68,274 / 68,274	$5,119,662
12 September	Munich	Germany	Olympiastadion	Marina; Charli XCX	54,017 / 54,017	$4,200,997
14 September	Leipzig	Germany	Red Bull Arena	Marina; Charli XCX	35,075 / 37,000	$2,668,989
16 September	Prague	Czech Republic	Synot Tip Arena	Marina; Charli XCX	34,609 / 34,609	$2,600,696
19 September	Warsaw	Poland	Stadion Narodowy	Marina; Charli XCX	40,492 / 40,492	$2,337,942
22 September	Hanover	Germany	AWD-Arena	Marina; Charli XCX	43,414 / 43,414	$3,295,516
10 November	Auckland	New Zealand	Mount Smart Stadium	The Temper Trap; The Pierces	37,394 / 37,394	$3,939,002
13 November	Melbourne	Australia	Etihad Stadium	The Temper Trap; The Pierces	63,378 / 63,378	$7,271,332
17 November	Sydney	Australia	Allianz Stadium	The Temper Trap; The Pierces	92,717 / 92,717	$10,755,464
18 November	Sydney	Australia	Allianz Stadium	The Temper Trap; The Pierces	92,717 / 92,717	$10,755,464
21 November	Brisbane	Australia	Suncorp Stadium	The Temper Trap; The Pierces	51,435 / 51,435	$6,014,804
29 December	Uncasville	United States	Mohegan Sun Arena	Naturally 7	6,518 / 6,518	$918,355
30 December	New York City (Note: Labelled as Brooklyn in promotional material.)	United States	Barclays Center	Naturally 7	16,014 / 16,014	$1,934,872
31 December (Note: The concert in New York City on 31 December 2012 was co-headlined with Jay-Z.)	New York City	United States	Barclays Center	—N/a	16,105 / 16,105	$2,871,570
Total					2,100,124 / 2,113,801 (99.3%)	$181,396,540

== Cancelled shows ==
List of cancelled concerts
Date (2013)	City	Country	Venue	Reason	Ref.
5 February	São Paulo	Brazil	Estádio do Morumbi	"Circumstances beyond our control"	
7 February	Porto Alegre	Brazil	Estádio do Zequinha	"Circumstances beyond our control"	
9 February	La Plata	Argentina	Estadio Único de La Plata	"Circumstances beyond our control"	
12 February	Santiago	Chile	Estadio Monumental	"Circumstances beyond our control"	
15 February	Mexico City	Mexico	Foro Sol	"Circumstances beyond our control"	
18 February	Zapopan (Note: Labelled as Guadalajara in promotional material.)	Mexico	Estadio Tres de Marzo	"Circumstances beyond our control"	
19 February	San Nicolás (Note: Labelled as Monterrey in promotional material.)	Mexico	Estadio Universitario	"Circumstances beyond our control"	

== Personnel ==
Credits adapted from the band's official tour book, which was sold exclusively on merchandise booths and their online store.

Performing members

- Chris Martin – lead vocals, piano, keyboards, rhythm guitar
- Jonny Buckland – lead guitar, backing vocals, keyboards
- Guy Berryman – bass, backing vocals, keyboards, percussion
- Will Champion – drums, backing vocals, percussion

Main crew

- Dave Holmes – manager
- Phil Harvey – creative director
- Marguerite Nguyen – tour manager
- EJ McDonald, Jessie Collins – artist assistant
- Dan Green – sound engineer and producer
- Miller – Pro Tools, website
- Rik Simpson – record engineer and producer

3D Management

- Arlene Moon
- Mandi Bursteen
- Aziyn Babayan

Production

- Bill Leabody – production manager
- Steve Iredale – stadium site coordinator
- Craig Finley – stage manager
- Nicole Erin Kuhns – production coordinator
- Tiffany Henry – wardrobe

Backline

- Matt McGinn, Craig Hope – guitar tech
- Sean Buttery – drum tech
- Neil Lambert – keys and digital tech
- Paul Newman – bass tech

Sound

- Chris Wood – monitor engineer
- Tony Smith – FoH assistant
- Nick Davis – monitor assistant
- Ali Viles – RF tech

Sound crew

- Sid Rogerson (chief)
- Kyle Walsh (chief)
- Nick Mooney
- Conor Dunne
- Josh de Jong
- Craig Gordon
- Matt Latham
- John Switzer
- Victor Arko
- Jordan Kolenc
- Kurt Wolf

Lighting crew

- Mick Stowe (chief)
- Graham Feast (operator)
- Phil Sharp
- Ricky Butler
- Kris Lundberg
- Wayne Kwiat
- Marta Iwan
- John Bailey
- Gareth Pritchard
- Paul Burke
- Ben Rogerson
- Mark Goodwall

Video crew

- Andy Bramley (director)
- Ed Jarman (engineer)
- Ben Miles (media servers)
- Phil Johnston
- Pieter Laleman
- Sacha Moore
- Robyn Tearle
- Chip Wood

Rigging crew

- Russell Glenn (head rigger)
- Jerry Hough (coordinator)
- Bjorn Melchert
- Matt Rynes

Carpenters

- Pat Boyd
- Mike Humeniuk
- Andy Pearson

Special effects

- David Kennedy – laser and pyro designer
- Mike Hartle – lasers
- John Lyons – pyro
- Derek Purciful – confetti

Security

- Andy Frost, Kelly Samuels – artist security
- Jackie Jackson – venue security

Stage

- Paul Normandale – lighting and production designer
- Misty Buckley – stage and prop designer
- Paris, Reggie Matherson, Lynden Mallinson – painter

Trainer

- Dan Portanier

Catering

- Soozie Coll
- Alicia Boardman
- Pauline Austin
- Jesse Davies
- Piers Dawson
- Sharon Jackson

Stadium dressing rooms

- Dave Loudon
- Ian Thomason

Representatives

- Hal Hamer, Dan Vitt – merchandise (North America)
- Paul Nolan – merchandise (Europe)
- Julie Matway – Live Nation
- Rachel Edwards – Oxfam
- Gavin Maude, Jonathan Petch – legal

VIP ticketing coordinator

- Tiffany Hiliard
- Arman Chaparyan

Xylobands

- Jason Regler
- Hillside Design

Accounting

- Alex Pollock – tour accountant
- Dales Evans, Lester Dales, Paul Making – band accountant

US Accounting

- David Weise & Co.
- Sue Davidian
- Diana de La Cerda
- Laurie Wolf

UK Accounting

- Headlong Tours
- Dale Evans & Co.
- Lester Dales
- Paul Makin
- Tracy Lawson
- Debbie Johnson

Booking agents

- Marty Diamond, Larry Webman – North America
- Steve Strange, Josh Javor – ROW

Record company

- Parlophone – UK
- EMI Music – US
- Kevin Brown, Rob Wood – ROW

Suppliers

- Champman Freeborn Airchartering – aircraft charter
- Beat the Street, Senators Coaches – bussing
- Eat to the Beat – catering
- Cube Services – credentials
- Global Motion – freight
- Moorcrofts of London – UK ground transport
- Daitz Personal Logistics LLC – US ground transport
- Stars and Cars – Europe ground transport
- Robertson Taylor – insurance
- The Factory – itinerary books
- Lite Alternative, Upstaging Radios, Road Radios – lighting
- Celebrity Protection, Keleca Associates – security
- Brilliant Stages, Hangman, Specialz, Air Artists – set building
- Strictly FX – special effects
- All Access – staging
- Wigwam Acoustics, 8th Day Sound – sound
- XL Video – video
- Stagetruck, Upstaging – trucking
- The Appointment Group – UK travel
- Altour – US travel
- The Event Safety Shop – health, safety

Website

- Brian Schulmeister, Wendy Marvel – design
- Chris Salmon – editor
- Debs Wild – ambassador

Tour book

- Wendy Marvel – designer
- Chris Salmon – interviews
- Paris, Coldplay, Tappin Gofton – original album artwork

Tour book production

- Jeremy Joseph
- Dell Furano
- Rick Fish
- Pete Weber
- Tanya Davis
- Emily Theobald
- Kate Stretton

Photos courtesy of

- Miller
- Benjamin Etridge
- Sarah Lee
- Phil Harvey
- Noah Abrams

== See also ==
- List of Coldplay live performances
- List of highest-grossing live music artists

== Notes ==
Cities

Others
