= Princess of China =

2012 single by Coldplay and Rihanna

Single by Coldplay and Rihanna

from the album Mylo Xyloto
- Released: 14 February 2012
- Recorded: 2011
- Studio: The Bakery (London); The Beehive (London); Lethal (Barbados); Westlake (Los Angeles)
- Genre: Electronic rock; electropop; R&B
- Length: 3:59 (album version); 3:39 (radio edit)
- Label: Parlophone; Capitol
- Songwriters: Guy Berryman; Jonny Buckland; Will Champion; Chris Martin; Brian Eno
- Producers: Markus Dravs; Daniel Green; Rik Simpson

Coldplay singles chronology
| "Charlie Brown" (2011) | "Princess of China" (2012) | "Hurts Like Heaven" (2012) |

Rihanna singles chronology
| "Take Care" (2012) | "Princess of China" (2012) | "Birthday Cake" (2012) |

Music video
- "Princess of China" on YouTube

"Princess of China" is a duet recorded by British rock band Coldplay and Barbadian singer Rihanna for Coldplay's fifth studio album Mylo Xyloto (2011). The song was written by band members Guy Berryman, Jonny Buckland, Will Champion, and Chris Martin, with additional composition by Brian Eno and a sample from "Takk..." performed by Sigur Rós. The song was released as the fourth single from Mylo Xyloto and was sent to US Mainstream radio on 14 February 2012. It was later released as a digital download on 13 April 2012. A companion EP to the single, featuring an acoustic version of the song, was released on 1 June 2012.

Influenced by the music genres of electronic rock, electropop and R&B, "Princess of China" was met with a mixed reception from music critics; some praised the chemistry between Martin and Rihanna, while others criticized the song itself as generic and uninspired. The song performed well on international charts, peaking at number 20 on the US Billboard Hot 100 and number four on the UK Singles Chart. It has also reached the top ten of the Australian and New Zealand charts and five other international charts.

The song's accompanying music video, directed by Adria Petty and Alan Bibby, was filmed in March 2012 in Los Angeles and released on 2 June 2012. The video depicts a complicated love story of Rihanna and Chris Martin, scenes of which include a sword fight and Rihanna imitating a multi-armed goddess. The video received positive reviews, with critics praising the Asian theme. The song was performed live on the 54th Grammy Awards held at Staples Center in Los Angeles.

== Writing, recording and release ==
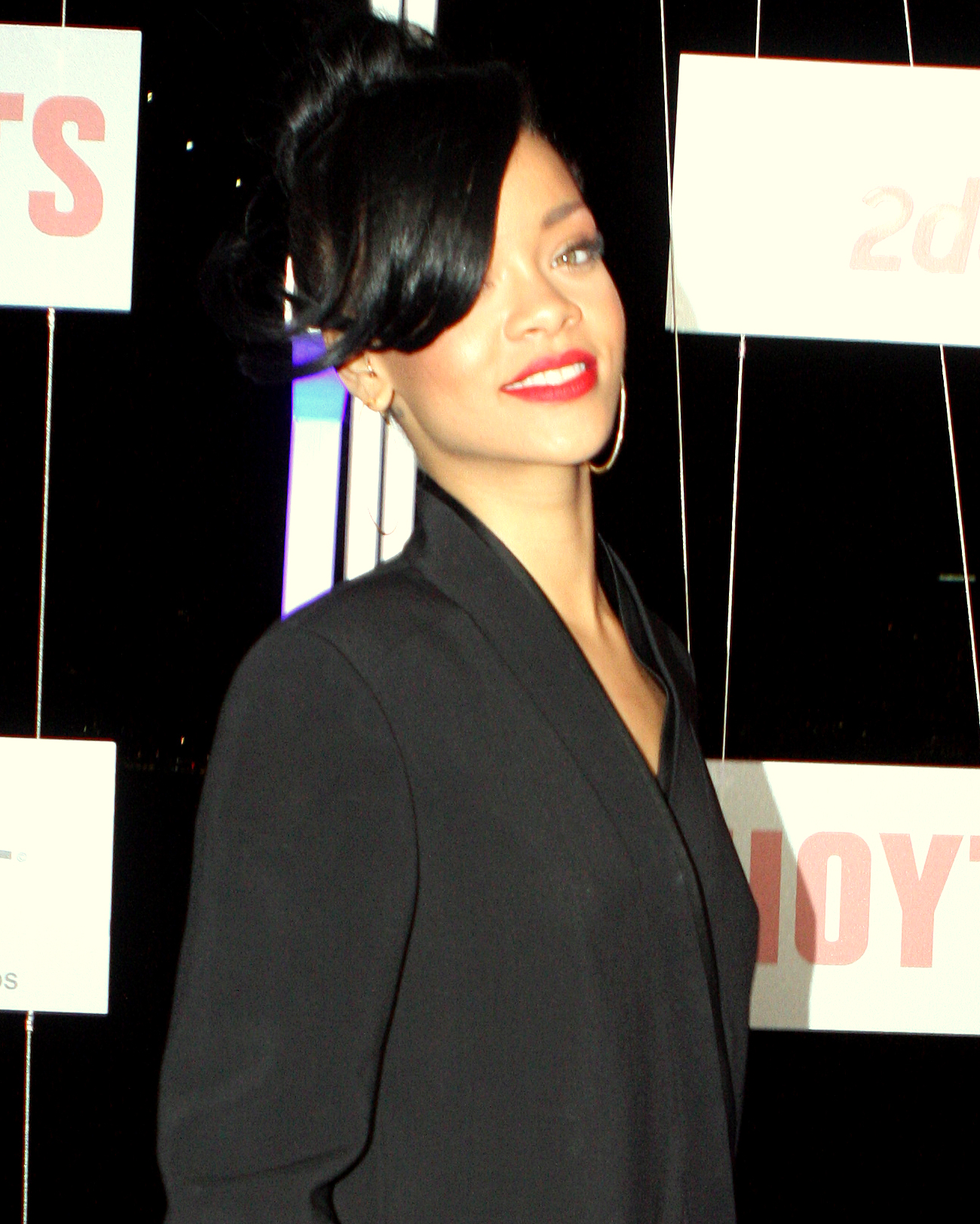
Barbadian recording artist Rihanna lent her vocals on "Princess of China".

"Princess of China" was written by Guy Berryman, Jonny Buckland, Will Champion, Brian Eno and Chris Martin. The production of the song was helmed by Markus Dravs, Dan Green and Rik Simpson. During the recording sessions for their fifth studio album Mylo Xyloto, the frontman of Coldplay, Chris Martin confirmed the band had recorded a song with Barbadian recording artist Rihanna. Martin explained that the song was specifically written for Rihanna to be featured on, and hoped that she would like it enough to want to lend her vocals to the track, while further stating, "In like a dream scenario, we had a song that I'd secretly kind of written to see if Rihanna would want to sing it ... and then the rest of the band wanted to keep it, so we came up with the idea of asking her to sing it with us, and, to our great surprise, she said okay". Martin also explained how he approached the singer about collaborating on the song, saying, "The album [Mylo Xyloto] is designed as a whole piece. It has boy and girl lead characters and top of our list for the girl part was Rihanna, but it took a while to pluck up the courage to ask her. We did a show in Las Vegas and I met her and said, 'Do you think there's any chance?' I was very Hugh Grant-like and spluttering about it."

The song was mixed by Mark Spike Stent, Rik Simpson, Daniel Green and Michael Brauer. In an interview with MTV News Martin confirmed that the "Princess of China" is the band's favourite song on the album because of how it differs from their previous efforts in terms of genre and musical direction. When asked if fans would unite and react favourably to the song, Martin expressed that he was not concerned with how it would be received, and noted that Rihanna is always pushing the boundaries of the music industry.

On 21 September 2011, reports surfaced online that Will Champion, who plays the drums in the band, had expressed interest in singing the lyrics that were ultimately delegated to Rihanna. Martin dispelled the suggestion that there was any tension between the bandmates and Rihanna, saying, "There's a bit of a love story thread so we really needed someone to sing higher than me. For all Will's good intentions, he can't do it. You need to be female."

"Princess of China" premiered on Dutch radio on 16 October 2011 and was later uploaded to the band's official VEVO account on YouTube, but it was removed by their record label, EMI. The song was made available to purchase via digital download on 25 October 2011.

== Composition ==
Princess of China
Sample of "Princess of China" from Coldplay's 2011 album Mylo Xyloto.

"Princess of China" is influenced by the music genres of electronic rock, electropop, and R&B. The song starts with a sample of Sigur Rós' "Takk...", which is also featured throughout the song. As noted by Amy Sciarretto of Popcrush, it features a "moody" and heavy synth throughout the duration of the song, which resembles Depeche Mode's intro to It's No Good. The song also prominently features both Martin's and Rihanna's falsetto register, which was praised by multiple critics. Gil Kaufman of MTV News noted that both of the vocalists' falsettos matched each other perfectly, and that Martin's falsetto complemented Rihanna's higher register. Judah Joseph of The Huffington Post gave an explanation of the song's composition as part of his review, writing "The best way to describe the composition behind 'Princess of China' is to compare it to an old-school Zelda Gameboy [sic] game's sound effects – but in the best way. The song is epic, Asia-influenced, and it exemplifies the adventurous vibe that comes from an alternative-hip-hop combination." According to the sheet music published on Musicnotes.com by Sony/ATV Music Publishing, the song is written in the time signature of common time, and is composed in the key of A minor with a tempo of 84 beats per minute. The song follows a basic sequence of Am_{7}–C–Dm/F–G_{6} as its chord progression.

== Critical reception ==
"Princess of China" received mixed reviews from music critics. A reviewer for NME commented that "Princess of China" is an attempt to sound as pop-oriented as possible and compared the effort to one of Coldplay's previous singles, "Viva la Vida", writing, "Well, if you can get beyond the outrageously chart-hungry intro – that glossy synth sound wouldn't sound out of place on a Taio Cruz album – it's actually kind of awesome. For all the poppy surface sheen, this is a song with surprisingly hefty balls, possessed of a pounding momentum that recalls 'Viva La Vida'." Josh Eells said, in his review of the album for Rolling Stone, that "Princess of China" is a ballad about loss and regret, co-starring Rihanna. It's a partnership that probably came together over champagne brunch at Jay-Z's, but its synth-fuzz groove is offhandedly seductive."

Robbie Daw of Idolator praised the collaboration, writing "the marriage of Chris Martin and [Rihanna]'s vocals is a solid one", but noted that he was not sure what to expect. Judah Joseph of The Huffington Post praised the song, calling it a "collaborative monster", and noted that the song was likely to be chosen as a single to gain airplay and because "it is simply too good". Neil McCormick of The Daily Telegraph reviewed the song favourably, and labelled the collaboration as "effective", writing "the richly textured backing bringing out interesting nuances in her sweet but tough vocal, but it is the very English soulfulness of Martin himself that really adds depth to Coldplay." Jason Lipshutz, of Billboard, called the song "the most epic breakup song in recent memory: after Chris Martin warbles, "Once upon a time, we fell apart/You hold it in your hands, like two-halves in your heart," the verse is washed away in a sea of sinister synthesizer and pounding "Woh-oh-oh's". Mark Hogan of Spin gave a mixed review of the song, writing that although the song is "inoffensive", it is not "inspiring".

== Chart performance ==
Upon the release of Mylo Xyloto, "Princess of China" debuted at its peak of number 20 on the US Billboard Hot 100 chart. The song sold 105,000 digital copies in its first week and debuted at number eight on Hot Digital Songs for the chart issue dated 12 November 2011. However, the next week it fell 56 places to number 76, representing the biggest fall for the week. The single re-entered the US Billboard Hot 100 on 11 February 2012 at number 98, following the announcement that Rihanna and Coldplay are set to perform the song together at the 54th Grammy Awards. The next week it fell off the chart again, before re-entering again on 25 February 2012 at number 75. The single became Coldplay's fifth and Rihanna's twentieth top-twenty song in the US. "Princess of China" debuted at number 39 on the US Pop Songs for the issue dated 14 January 2012 and later managed to peak at number 24 on 31 March 2012. "Princess of China" debuted at its peak of number 17 on the Canadian Hot 100 on 12 November 2011 based solely on digital downloads. The next week it dropped to number 41 before falling of the chart.

The song entered the UK Singles Chart at number 33 on 5 November 2011, after the release of Mylo Xyloto. The next week it dropped to number 49 before falling of the chart. "Princess of China" re-entered the chart on 19 May 2012 at number 61. After five weeks, the single reached its peak of number 4 and stayed on the position for one week. The song has sold 475,000 copies in the UK in 2012, and was ranked No. 25 in the year's best-selling single list. As of February 2016, the single has sold 560,000 copies in the UK, marking it Coldplay's 4th biggest-selling single in the country.

"Princess of China" made its singles chart debut in Ireland and the Wallonia region of Belgium on 28 October 2011. In Ireland, the song debuted at number 22, which meant that Rihanna had four different songs from four different albums, including two of her own, in the top forty of the chart, with "We Found Love" (Talk That Talk, 2011) featuring Calvin Harris at number one, "Princess of China" (Mylo Xyloto, 2011) at number 22, "Fly" (Pink Friday, 2010) with Nicki Minaj at number 30 and "Cheers (Drink to That)" (Loud, 2010) at number 39. In the Wallonia region of Belgium, the song debuted at number 45 on the singles chart. In Denmark, the song debuted at number 17 on 4 November 2011. The song re-entered the chart at number 20 on 15 June 2012 and reached its peak of seven after two weeks. It stayed for a total of 10 weeks on the chart. "Princess of China" debuted and peaked at number 14 for one week on the Finnish Singles Chart. In Germany, the song debuted at number 97 in May 2012.

== Music video ==
=== Background and release ===
The video was filmed in March 2012 in Los Angeles. It was directed by Adria Petty and Alan Bibby. Rihanna described her look in the video as "gangsta goth geisha". Starting from 17 April 2012, a tour edition of the video started playing behind the band as they perform the song during their North American leg of their Mylo Xyloto Tour. The tour version of the video shows Rihanna wearing two different costumes and golden nail guards as she performs a choreography with her arms in front of a background with colorful effects. It contains visual references to various Chinese wuxia films, including Ang Lee's Crouching Tiger, Hidden Dragon, and Zhang Yimou's Hero, House of Flying Daggers and Curse of the Golden Flower.

It was confirmed that the full video would be finished by the third week of May 2012. During the second week of May, Coldplay released sketch drawings as teasers of "Princess of China" video. On 14 May 2012, Coldplay and Rihanna released a behind the scenes video of "Princess of China" via VEVO and their own YouTube channels. The video was officially released on 2 June 2012.

=== Synopsis ===
The video portrays Chris Martin and Rihanna as lovers with a complicated story. In one of the scenes Martin and Rihanna are seen kneeling in a desert, with their foreheads touching each other, as they bemoan the loss of their love. The scene then becomes violent as they engage in a sword-fight. The video closes on scenes of Chris Martin seated on a throne watching Rihanna dance with a red coloured drape surrounded by female dancers kneeling down and men beating the drums. At one point, Rihanna's hair was pinned up with chopsticks, and she is also depicted as a multi-armed goddess.

== Live performances ==
Coldplay and Rihanna performed an acoustic version "Princess of China" for the first time at the 54th Grammy Awards, held at the Staples Center in Los Angeles. They performed the song in a medley with "We Found Love" and "Paradise". Starting from 17 April 2012, the song was also performed during Coldplay's Mylo Xyloto Tour with Rihanna on screen.

Coldplay and Rihanna performed "Princess of China" together live at Coldplay's Paris show at Stade De France on 2 September 2012. They also performed "Umbrella" during Encore. They once again performed "Princess of China " at the closing ceremony of the 2012 Summer Paralympics at the Olympic Stadium in London on 9 September 2012.

== Track listing ==
Digital download
| No. | Title | Length |
|---|---|---|
| 1. | "Princess of China" (Radio edit) | 3:39 |
| 2. | "Princess of China" (Invisible Men remix) | 3:49 |

EP
| No. | Title | Length |
|---|---|---|
| 1. | "Princess of China" (Radio edit) | 3:39 |
| 2. | "Princess of China" (Invisible Men remix) | 3:46 |
| 3. | "Paradise" (Tiësto remix) | 4:46 |
| 4. | "Princess of China" (Acoustic) | 3:26 |

EU promotional single
| No. | Title | Length |
|---|---|---|
| 1. | "Princess of China" (Radio edit) | 3:35 |
| 2. | "Princess of China" (Invisible Men remix) | 3:49 |
| 3. | "Princess of China" (Album version) | 3:59 |
| 4. | "Princess of China" (Instrumental) | 3:59 |

US promotional single
| No. | Title | Length |
|---|---|---|
| 1. | "Princess of China" (Andre Sobota Remix) | 5:06 |
| 2. | "Princess of China" (Invisible Men Remix) | 3:49 |
| 3. | "Princess of China" (Kat Krazy Remix) | 3:31 |
| 4. | "Princess of China" (Kat Krazy Extended Mix) | 4:49 |

== Credits and personnel ==
Personnel

- Chris Martin ― lead vocals, keyboards, acoustic guitar
- Jonny Buckland - lead guitar, keyboards
- Guy Berryman - bass guitar, keyboards
- Will Champion - electronic drums
- Rihanna ― featured vocals
- Markus Dravs, Daniel Green, Rik Simpson ― production
- Kuk Harrell – vocal producer for Rihanna
- Davide Rossi – strings
- Spike Stent – mix engineer
- Bob Ludwig – mastering engineer
- Tappin Gofton – graphic design
- Paris and Coldplay – album art

Video credits

- Adria Petty, Alan Bibby ― direction
- Sheira Rees-Davies ― executive producer
- Clark Jackson ― line producer
- Maura Naughton ― post producer
- Stéphane Vallée ― direction of photography
- Hi-Hat ― choreographing
- Annie Sperling ― production designer

Costume design

- Mel Ottenburg (Rihanna)
- Lauren Bradley (Chris Martin)
- Ivy Jarrin (background talent)
- Joe Gawler and Zak Tucker @ Harbor Picture Company ― color correction
- Copa Network (Vico Sharabani, Yfat Neev, Steve Reiss) ― visual effects
- QuietMan (Johnnie Semerad, Carey Gattyan, Anthony Ferrara) ― visual effects
- Akiko Iwakawa @ Cut+Run ― editional
  - Ashley Carrier ― production
  - Rana Martin ― executive producer

== Charts ==
=== Weekly charts ===
Weekly chart performance
| Chart (2011–2012) | Peak position |
|---|---|
| Australia (ARIA) | 16 |
| Austria (Ö3 Austria Top 40) | 25 |
| Belgium (Ultratop 50 Flanders) | 20 |
| Belgium (Ultratop 50 Wallonia) | 24 |
| Canada Hot 100 (Billboard) | 17 |
| CIS Airplay (TopHit) | 155 |
| Croatia International Airplay (HRT) | 20 |
| Czech Republic Airplay (ČNS IFPI) | 5 |
| Denmark (Tracklisten) | 7 |
| Euro Digital Song Sales (Billboard) | 6 |
| Finland (Finland's Official List) | 14 |
| France (SNEP) | 24 |
| Germany (GfK) | 41 |
| Greece Digital Songs (Billboard) | 8 |
| Hungary (Single Top 40) | 3 |
| Hungary (Rádiós Top 40) | 18 |
| Ireland (IRMA) | 5 |
| Israel (Media Forest TV Airplay) | 1 |
| Israel International Airplay (Media Forest) | 5 |
| Italy (FIMI) | 14 |
| Italy Airplay (EarOne) | 5 |
| Netherlands (Dutch Top 40) | 20 |
| Mexico (Billboard Ingles Airplay) | 2 |
| New Zealand (Recorded Music NZ) | 8 |
| Norway (VG-lista) | 8 |
| Scottish Singles Sales (Official Charts) | 4 |
| Slovakia Airplay (ČNS IFPI) | 30 |
| South Korea International (Gaon) | 29 |
| Spain (Promusicae) | 24 |
| Switzerland (Schweizer Hitparade) | 20 |
| UK Singles (Official Charts) | 4 |
| US Billboard Hot 100 | 20 |
| US Pop Airplay (Billboard) | 24 |

=== Year-end charts ===
Year-end chart performance
| Chart (2012) | Position |
|---|---|
| Belgium (Ultratop 50 Flanders) | 90 |
| Belgium (Ultratop 50 Wallonia) | 94 |
| Hungary (Rádiós Top 40) | 69 |
| Italy (FIMI) | 50 |
| Italy Airplay (EarOne) | 29 |
| UK Singles (OCC) | 25 |

== Certifications and sales ==
Certifications and sales
| Region | Certification | Certified units/sales |
|---|---|---|
| Australia (ARIA) | Platinum | 70,000^{^} |
| Denmark (IFPI Danmark) | Gold | 15,000^{^} |
| France | — | 43,400 (Note: French year-end sales for "Princess of China" in 2012.) |
| Italy (FIMI) | Platinum | 30,000^{*} |
| Mexico (AMPROFON) | Gold | 30,000^{*} |
| New Zealand (RMNZ) | Gold | 7,500^{*} |
| Spain (Promusicae) | Gold | 30,000^{‡} |
| United Kingdom (BPI) | 2× Platinum | 1,360,563 (Note: British total sales for "Princess of China" as of September 2026.) |
Streaming
| Denmark (IFPI Danmark) | Platinum | 1,800,000^{†} |
^{*} Sales figures based on certification alone.^{^} Shipments figures based on certification alone.^{‡} Sales+streaming figures based on certification alone.^{†} Streaming-only figures based on certification alone.

== Release history ==
Release dates and formats
| Country | Release date | Format |
|---|---|---|
| United States | 14 February 2012 | Contemporary hit radio |
| Switzerland | 13 April 2012 | Digital download |
| Sweden | 13 April 2012 | Digital download |
| Spain | 13 April 2012 | Digital download |
| Portugal | 13 April 2012 | Digital download |
| Norway | 13 April 2012 | Digital download |
| New Zealand | 13 April 2012 | Digital download |
| Netherlands | 13 April 2012 | Digital download |
| Luxembourg | 13 April 2012 | Digital download |
| Japan | 13 April 2012 | Digital download |
| Italy | 13 April 2012 | Digital download |
| Ireland | 13 April 2012 | Digital download |
| Greece | 13 April 2012 | Digital download |
| Finland | 13 April 2012 | Digital download |
| Denmark | 13 April 2012 | Digital download |
| Canada | 13 April 2012 | Digital download |
| United States | 13 April 2012 | Digital download |
| Belgium | 13 April 2012 | Digital download |
| Austria | 13 April 2012 | Digital download |
| Australia | 13 April 2012 | Digital download |
| Germany | 13 April 2012 | Digital download |
| France | 13 April 2012 | Digital download |
| Italy | 20 April 2012 | Contemporary hit radio |

Release dates and formats
| Country | Release date | Format |
|---|---|---|
| Switzerland | 1 June 2012 | Digital remixes EP |
| Sweden | 1 June 2012 | Digital remixes EP |
| Spain | 1 June 2012 | Digital remixes EP |
| Portugal | 1 June 2012 | Digital remixes EP |
| Norway | 1 June 2012 | Digital remixes EP |
| New Zealand | 1 June 2012 | Digital remixes EP |
| Netherlands | 1 June 2012 | Digital remixes EP |
| Luxembourg | 1 June 2012 | Digital remixes EP |
| Japan | 1 June 2012 | Digital remixes EP |
| Italy | 1 June 2012 | Digital remixes EP |
| Ireland | 1 June 2012 | Digital remixes EP |
| Greece | 1 June 2012 | Digital remixes EP |
| Finland | 1 June 2012 | Digital remixes EP |
| Denmark | 1 June 2012 | Digital remixes EP |
| Canada | 1 June 2012 | Digital remixes EP |
| United States | 1 June 2012 | Digital remixes EP |
| Belgium | 1 June 2012 | Digital remixes EP |
| Austria | 1 June 2012 | Digital remixes EP |
| Australia | 1 June 2012 | Digital remixes EP |
| Germany | 1 June 2012 | Digital remixes EP |
| France | 1 June 2012 | Digital remixes EP |
| United Kingdom | 4 June 2012 | Digital remixes EP |

== See also ==
- List of UK top-ten singles in 2012
