= Hurts Like Heaven =

2012 single by Coldplay

Single by Coldplay

from the album Mylo Xyloto
- Released: 8 October 2012
- Recorded: 2010
- Genre: Dance-rock; indie rock; new wave
- Length: 4:02 (album version); 4:20 (Single edit); 3:58 (US radio edit)
- Label: Parlophone; Capitol
- Songwriters: Guy Berryman; Jonny Buckland; Will Champion; Brian Eno; Chris Martin
- Producers: Markus Dravs; Daniel Green; Rik Simpson

Coldplay singles chronology
"Princess of China" (2012)	"Hurts Like Heaven" (2012)	"Atlas" (2013)

Music video
- "Hurts Like Heaven" on YouTube

"Hurts Like Heaven" is a song by British rock band Coldplay from their fifth studio album, Mylo Xyloto (2011). It was written by all members of the band along with producer Brian Eno, being released as the final single from the record on 8 October 2012. The track promoted the comics which tied into the original story from Mylo Xyloto. On 16 April 2013, the band announced it as a 7" limited single for Record Store Day, with a live version of "Us Against the World" serving as its B-side.

== Background ==
In an interview with The Independent, lead singer Chris Martin stated that guitarist Jonny Buckland was largely involved in the creation of "Hurts Like Heaven", saying of the song: "'Hurts Like Heaven' is all Jonny. It only has two chords. The songs are group-y, it's guitar-y. Jonny is coming out of his cocoon. We're just trying some risky things."

Reviews of the song have noted that the song contains signs of influences of the other artists; in their preview of Mylo Xyloto, Q noted that "the melodies, like the title, are a nod to the '80s heroes they so successfully channelled on A Rush of Blood to the Head, The Cure and Echo and the Bunnymen's influence looming large as Chris Martin sings like he's in a hurry [...] the chorus [...] is as upliftingly bittersweet as Robert Smith and co's best pop songs, whilst the "whoa oh oh" bridge provides the record's first stadium-singalong moment." Reviews from both Rolling Stone and The A.V. Club have drawn comparisons to dance-punk band LCD Soundsystem, with the latter calling the song "a driving homage" to the band.

== Music video ==
The music video for "Hurts Like Heaven" was announced at the 2012 San Diego Comic-Con. Coldplay posted a 30-second teaser trailer on Twitter on the evening of 5 October 2012. It was later released on 8 October 2012. The clip, which does not feature the band, is a comic book style animation set on a futuristic dystopian storyline and it's the animated version of the first number of the Mylo Xyloto comics. Directed by Mark Osborne with illustrations by Alejandro Fuentes, the video contains flashes of neons, the band's trademark over the course of Mylo Xyloto's promotions.

A frame from the music video showing Aiko and Lela drawing sparks over the "silencers" posters along a street of "Silencia".

The story is set in the world of "Silencia" ruled by a dictator: Major Minus, who wants to take colors and sounds off the streets and controls the population through propaganda (like posters on the walls that invite people to be silent) and his army of "silencers". The video follows Aiko and Lela, two "sparkers" (people who are able to use energy to draw bright and colorful graffiti on the walls), who, with other "sparkers", light up the streets of "Silencia" escaping from the "silencers" who eventually catch and arrest them.

== Critical reception ==
"Hurts Like Heaven" received generally positive reviews from critics. Will Hermes of Rolling Stone published a favourable review of "Hurts Like Heaven"; giving the track 3 and a half stars out of 5, he praised the song's "outstanding guitar asides", noting that the song's word rush "occasionally recalled LCD Soundsystem's 'All My Friends'". In his review of Mylo Xyloto, Ian Cohen of Pitchfork Media called the song "a remarkably aerodynamic piece of all-purpose inspirational rock that never gets too pushy even with [Chris] Martin's meaningful/meaningless proclamations." Josh Modell of The A.V. Club also reviewed the song positively, calling it a "nice kick in the formula", calling the band "expert formula-repeaters." Mikael Wood of Spin wrote that the song "rides a zippy new-wave groove that justifies its Cure-conjuring title". Andy Gill of The Independent wrote that the song "opens proceedings at a peak, the twinkly demeanour of its bustling pop layered with disparate guitar lines".

== Live performances ==
Recorded in 2010, the song was first performed at the 2011 Rock Im Park festival in Nuremberg, Germany on 4 June 2011. It acts as an opener on both Mylo Xyloto and its corresponding tour, played immediately after the album's title track, "Mylo Xyloto", a 42-second instrumental that segues into "Hurts Like Heaven".

== Remixes ==
An official remix by Kat Krazy was released on 28 December 2012

== Track listings ==
Digital download
No.	Title	Length
1.	"Hurts Like Heaven" (Edit)	3:58

Promotional CD single
No.	Title	Length
1.	"Hurts Like Heaven" (Radio Edit)	3:02
2.	"Hurts Like Heaven" (Album Version)	4:23
3.	"Hurts Like Heaven" (Instrumental)	4:22

7" vinyl picture disc
No.	Title	Length
1.	"Hurts Like Heaven" (7" Edit)	3:17
2.	"Us Against the World" (From Live 2012)	3:52

== Charts ==
Weekly chart performance
Chart (2011–2012)	Peak position
Belgium (Ultratip Bubbling Under Flanders)	8
Belgium (Ultratip Bubbling Under Wallonia)	9
Iceland (RÚV)	10
Italy Airplay (EarOne)	44
Netherlands (Dutch Top 40 Tipparade)	2
South Korea International (Gaon)	21
UK Singles (The Official Charts Company)	157
US Alternative Songs (Billboard)	27

== Release history ==
Release date and formats
Region	Date	Format	Label
United States	30 July 2012	Digital download	Parlophone
United States	6 August 2012	Adult album alternative radio	Capitol
United States	7 August 2012	Modern rock radio	Capitol
Italy	14 September 2012	Contemporary hit radio	Warner Music
United Kingdom	20 April 2013	7"	Parlophone
