= Major Minus =

Song by Coldplay

from the album Mylo Xyloto
- A-side: "Every Teardrop Is a Waterfall"
- Released: 3 June 2011
- Recorded: 2008–10
- Genre: Alternative rock
- Length: 3:30
- Label: Parlophone; Capitol
- Songwriters: Guy Berryman; Jonny Buckland; Will Champion; Brian Eno; Chris Martin
- Producers: Markus Dravs; Daniel Green; Rik Simpson

"Major Minus" is a song by British rock band Coldplay. It was produced by Markus Dravs, Daniel Green and Rik Simpson, being the eighth track from the band's fifth studio album Mylo Xyloto (2011). The song takes its title from a fictional character of the same name created by the band, who is based on a collection of various media oligarchs and politicians.

== Recording ==
The song was recorded by aLEca in the Beehive, the band's personal recording studio in London. It was one of the first songs from Mylo Xyloto to be recorded, having been primarily recorded in 2008, with the final touches being added in early 2010.

== Development ==
According to excerpts from the band's personal notes contained within the limited, pop-up edition of the album, the song was originally titled "Silencia". The lead singer of the band, Chris Martin said that the song was inspired by Cormac McCarthy's book The Road. In an interview with the band by the American publication Billboard, Martin described the song as "a sort of villainous, dark piece", adding that "It's the idea of two people running away from a Kafka environment, or an Orwellian thing". Other sources of inspiration for the song include the 1970s and 80s graffiti movement of New York City and the White Rose movement. According to Martin, he admires people who speak out and express themselves in negative environments, admitting he's not always done that himself:

I admire it. I've spent a lot of my life playing it a bit safe or conforming to something, even though I didn't agree with it. So I have respect and admiration for people who don't. The ideas come from graffiti art of the 70s in New York, where people were expressing themselves with paint. Then there was the White Rose Movement. Anybody who's standing up for themselves. It's about being free to be yourself and to express yourself among negative surroundings. Being able to speak out or follow your passion, even if everybody seems against it.

== Release ==
The song was first released on 23 June 2011, as the b-side to "Every Teardrop Is a Waterfall". It was then re-released with the companion track "Moving to Mars" on the Every Teardrop Is a Waterfall EP on 27 June 2011. Finally, it was released as part of the band's fifth album Mylo Xyloto on 24 October 2011.

== Reception ==
In a cover story run by American magazine Billboard on Mylo Xyloto, Coldplay described "Major Minus" as "an ominous, thundering beast of a song with rattling guitars, potent (and rare) Buckland solos and restless, shifting musical patterns". In an article published by Q on 10 October 2011 entitled "First Impressions of... Coldplay's Mylo Xyloto", they wrote:

Beginning with the jagged strum of a detuned acoustic guitar, Major Minus sounds like the bitter flipside of God Put A Smile Upon Your Face. Chris Martin's vocals sounding like they were recorded in a seedy phonebox, the "they got one eye on the road/ And one on you" chorus delivered amidst guitar shards and a kinetic percussive groove. One of the most immediate songs on the album, and the most darkly playful thing they've done since Daylight.

== Live performances ==
Coldplay first performed "Major Minus" at a friends and family gig at The Forum, Kentish Town, London on 31 May 2011. They then continued to play it throughout the 2011 Summer Festival Tour, playing it in front of the general public for the first time at Rock im Park Festival in Nürnberg, Germany on 3 June 2011, and playing it again at Rock am Ring the following day, which was the first live broadcast of the song officially authorised by the band and management. During Coldplay's headlining performance on the Pyramid Stage at Glastonbury Festival on 25 June 2011, the hashtag #MajorMinus trended on Twitter worldwide after the song had been played.

== Charts ==
=== Weekly charts ===
Weekly chart performance
| Chart (2011) | Peak position |
|---|---|
| Australia (ARIA) | 72 |
| Belgium (Ultratop 50 Flanders) | 50 |
| Canada Hot 100 (Billboard) | 68 |
| France (SNEP) | 71 |
| South Korea International (Gaon) | 40 |
| Spain (Promusicae) | 26 |
| UK Singles (The Official Charts Company) | 133 |
| US Billboard Hot 100 | 92 |

=== Monthly charts ===
Monthly chart performance
| Chart (2011) | Peak position |
|---|---|
| South Korea International (Gaon) | 21 |
