= Paradise (Coldplay song) =

2011 single by Coldplay

Single by Coldplay

from the album Mylo Xyloto
- Released: 12 September 2011
- Recorded: 2010–2011
- Genre: Pop; new wave; pop rock
- Length: 4:37 (album version); 4:38 (single version); 4:20 (radio edit and video)
- Label: Parlophone; Capitol
- Songwriters: Guy Berryman; Jonny Buckland; Will Champion; Brian Eno; Chris Martin
- Producers: Markus Dravs; Daniel Green; Rik Simpson; Brian Eno

Coldplay singles chronology
"Every Teardrop Is a Waterfall" (2011)	"Paradise" (2011)	"Charlie Brown" (2011)

Audio sample
- file; help

Music video
- "Paradise" on YouTube

"Paradise" is a song by the British rock band Coldplay, released on 12 September 2011 as the second single from their fifth album, Mylo Xyloto. The song received its radio debut at 7:50 a.m. on The Chris Moyles Show (BBC Radio 1) on 12 September 2011. According to Coldplay's official website, the single was not initially chart eligible in the United Kingdom, because it was available on iTunes as an "instant grat" (immediate download) when pre-ordering the album. Following the release of the album on 30 October 2011, the song became chart eligible in the UK and entered the UK Singles Chart at number 14, before taking the number 1 spot on its tenth week, becoming the band's second number-one single after "Viva la Vida" in 2008.

On 30 November 2011, the song was nominated for a Grammy Award, in the Best Pop Duo/Group Performance category. On 12 February 2012, Coldplay performed "Paradise" live at the ceremony's 54th edition, along with "Princess of China". At the 2012 MTV Video Music Awards on 6 September, the song won the award for Best Rock Video.

== Background and composition ==
In 2010, the producers of ITV reality show The X Factor originally approached singer Chris Martin to write a winner's song for the seventh series of the show in 2010. "Paradise" was originally conceived by Martin as a response to the show's request, but drummer Will Champion insisted that the song be included on Mylo Xyloto.

The song is composed in the key of F major, with Chris Martin's vocals range from A_{3} to A_{5}.

== Critical reception ==
The song was met with positive reviews from the majority of music critics. Billboard gave a positive review calling the track "another slice of hug-warm ecstasy" and gave praise to the "boiling strings, rattling synthesisers, and bass-heavy-beats" saying "it shows they know how to bring a few new tricks to the table". Both Q and Rolling Stone offered similar praise, and also noted that it was another step in the right direction. Altsounds.com gave a similar review remarking that there are "Drums that you would expect in a Rihanna song and melodies you would expect from a band like Friendly Fires and the "oohs" from 3OH!3 is what you first hear. That is, of course, until Chris Martin's vocals come into play and there is no doubt in your mind that this is Coldplay. A wonderful chorus of "para-para-paradise" reminds you just how good they really are. It will remain with you for weeks to come, like that new piece of clothing you just can't get enough of".

About.com said, in a three-and-a-half star review, that "even when Coldplay sound a bit like they are spinning their wheels musically, it can still have quite beautiful moments." The review called the opening fanfare "simply gorgeous" but felt the rest of the song did not hold up as well as it could have. NME gave a more mixed reaction to the song and felt that "It's hard to say what the band is aiming for with the song. To replicate the epic football stadium 'moment' of 'Yellow'? The energy of a 'Viva La Vida'? If so it doesn't quite work on either count" but continued "if you're going to have a mid-paced Coldplay-by-numbers single-single, you may as well have one as grand and gorgeous as 'Paradise'".

=== Rankings ===
List of critic rankings
Publication	Year	Description	Result	Ref.
Consequence	2017	Every Alternative Rock No. 1 Hit from Worst to Best	80	
KROQ-FM	2024	Top 500 Songs from the Last 30 Years	262	
MTV Australia	2013	The Official Top 1000 All Time Classics	Placed	
NPO Radio 2	2011	Top 2000	74	
Only for DJs	2011	The Best of 2011	9	(Note: Credited to the Fedde Le Grand remix.)
Popjustice	2011	The Top 45 Singles of 2011	Placed	
Q	2019	Songs of the Decade (2010–2019)	Placed	
Rolling Stone	2011	Best Singles of 2011	41	
Time	2012	The Best of the 2012 Grammys	Placed	
YouGov UK	2011	Best Songs of 2011	9	

== Chart performance ==
"Paradise" became a top five hit in 16 countries. In the United States, it peaked at number 15 on the Billboard Hot 100 on the issue dating 5 November 2011. The single eventually spent 32 weeks on the Hot 100 in total, 29 of which were consecutive, while an additional three were around May 2012. Following the release on 12 September 2011, "Paradise" was revealed to be chart ineligible in the United Kingdom, having been offered as an "instant grat" (immediate download) for anyone who pre-ordered the album, Mylo Xyloto. The release of the album on 24 October 2011 saw "Paradise" debut at number 14 on the UK Singles Chart with sales of 27,277 copies (the track had a total of 118,547 downloads in the six weeks of chart ineligibility). After being made purchasable at 59p (instead of 99p) on iTunes Store and being played on the X Factor final, "Paradise" regained momentum in the United Kingdom and climbed up to number two on 18 December 2011. On 1 January 2012, "Paradise" became the first number-one single of 2012 in the United Kingdom and Coldplay's second, after "Viva la Vida" in 2008. In 2024, PPL ranked it as their second-most played song on British radio and television. According to ECAD, "Paradise" was the most played song on Brazilian radio between 2013 and 2023.

== Live performances ==
"Paradise" was first played live before an audience on the night of 9 September 2011: it was shot before the studio audience of the Parisian music TV show Taratata on French television France 2. The crowd's response to this first performance was described as "unmistakable" by one of the band's roadies.

== Music videos ==
Screenshot from the official video, showing Chris Martin on a unicycle in an elephant costume.

Coldplay initially announced that the single's music video would be directed by Hype Williams, but that version was scrapped after shooting and the band decided instead to record a new version directed by long-time collaborator Mat Whitecross. The band called Whitecross just a day before the shooting and the video's concept was finished just hours before the director travelled from London to South Africa. Frontman Chris Martin created the video's concept storyline, which was ultimately filmed in the style of a nature documentary. Due to a combination of time constraints in shooting the video and Martin's conceptualisation, the elephant suits were intendedly "lo-fi and spontaneous", and the unicycle had to be found in a hurry. The music video was released on YouTube on 18 October 2011.

In the video, Martin, dressed as an elephant, escapes from the zoo. He finds an abandoned sharing system bicycle, rides it to Belsize Park tube station, and takes the train to Heathrow Airport in an attempt to hitch-hike his way to another country, doing so finally by stowing away inside a suitcase. An aerial shot reveals that his initial destination was Cape Town, South Africa. He is then seen wandering around Johannesburg at one point, walking past Nelson Mandela Bridge and a set of railway tracks in Braamfontein. He then earns enough money, which appears to be ZAR 67.05 (roughly equivalent to GBP 5.34 or US$8.40), by busking on the street, which shows portions of the song's lyrics in sync, to buy transportation; he attempts to buy a bicycle, but the shopkeeper tells him he can only afford a unicycle. After a seemingly hopeless wander on his new unicycle (in which Martin takes off his elephant head for a second), he comes across three other elephants, who are the rest of Coldplay, playing the song in the veld. Drummer Will Champion is dressed as Snorky from the fictional band The Banana Splits, identifiable by his glasses and polka-dot ears. He starts playing with them, and the band eventually play a sell-out stadium concert together, before returning to the veld where they run towards the camera. The video was shot on location in London, Cape Town, the Klein Karoo in the Western Cape and Johannesburg.

The zoo that Martin escapes from is Paradise Wildlife Park in Broxbourne, Hertfordshire. The bike shop shown is Woodstock Cycleworks in Woodstock, Cape Town. The concert segment was filmed during Coldplay's Mylo Xyloto Tour concert at the FNB Stadium on 8 October 2011. After performing this song live, the band donned their elephant heads and gloves and pretended to perform as the last minute of the studio recording played. The concertgoers were encouraged to cheer and sing along as if they were actually performing. As of January 2026, the video has over two billion views on YouTube.

Another music video was directed by Shynola, who had directed the video for "Strawberry Swing". The video was intended as the first incarnation for the video before the band came up with the elephant concept. The promo pictures the life of a little girl that comes out of jail. A special video of "Paradise" was created for the 2012 Summer Paralympics and shown between event breaks. This version featured clips of Paralympian athletes competing in events.

== Track listing ==
UK promotional single
No.	Title	Length
1.	"Paradise" (Radio Edit)	4:20
2.	"Paradise" (Instrumental)	4:38

Digital download
No.	Title	Length
1.	"Paradise"	4:38

=== Remixes ===
Digital download – Fedde Le Grand Remix
No.	Title	Length
1.	"Paradise" (Fedde Le Grand Remix)	7:15

Digital download – Tiësto Remix
No.	Title	Length
1.	"Paradise" (Tiësto Remix)	4:45

== Personnel ==
- Chris Martin – lead and backing vocals, piano
- Jonny Buckland – guitar, keyboard, backing vocals
- Guy Berryman – bass guitar, backing vocals
- Will Champion – drums, backing vocals
- Brian Eno – synthesisers
- Davide Rossi – strings

== Usage in media ==
- Mike Tompkins released an a capella version of the song on 8 November 2011.
- Tyler Ward released an acoustic version of the song on 15 December 2011.
- David Garrett performed the song at his concert in Hanover on 18 October 2014.
- The Piano Guys recreated the song under the title "Peponi" ("Paradise" in Swahili), featuring singer Alex Boyé on 9 January 2012.
- Life of Pi featured the song in one of its trailers for the movie on 23 September 2012.
- Anu and Anmol Malik recreated the song under the title "Lamhein" ("Moments" in Hindi) on 1 October 2015.
- The City of Prague Philharmonic Orchestra released an orchestral version of the song for the trailer of BBC series Mammals on 12 March 2024.

== Charts ==
=== Weekly charts ===
Weekly chart performance
Chart (2011–2025)	Peak position
Argentina Hot 100 (Billboard)	72
Australia (ARIA)	3
Austria (Ö3 Austria Top 40)	22
Belgium (Ultratop 50 Flanders)	3
Belgium (Ultratop 50 Wallonia)	3
Brazil (Billboard Brasil Hot 100)	13
Brazil Hot Pop Songs	2
Canada Hot 100 (Billboard)	13
CIS Airplay (TopHit)	81
Czech Republic Airplay (ČNS IFPI)	1
Czech Republic Singles Digital (ČNS IFPI)	67
Denmark (Tracklisten)	5
Finland (Suomen virallinen lista)	5
France (SNEP)	5
Germany (GfK)	12
Germany (Airplay Chart)	1
Greece Digital Songs (Billboard)	5
Greece International (IFPI)	20
Hungary (Rádiós Top 40)	7
Iceland (RÚV)	2
India International (IMI)	19
Ireland (IRMA)	2
Israel International Airplay (Media Forest)	2
Italy (FIMI)	2
Italy Airplay (EarOne)	2
Japan Hot 100 (Billboard)	16
Mexico (Billboard Ingles Airplay)	1
Malaysia (Billboard)	25
Netherlands (Dutch Top 40)	3
Netherlands (Single Top 100)	2
New Zealand (Recorded Music NZ)	3
Norway (VG-lista)	1
Portugal (AFP)	24
Russia Airplay (TopHit)	93
Scottish Singles Sales (Official Charts)	1
Singapore (RIAS)	8
South Korea International (Gaon)	6
Slovenia (SloTop50)	46
Spain (Promusicae)	5
Sweden (Sverigetopplistan)	42
Switzerland (Schweizer Hitparade)	4
United Arab Emirates (IFPI)	13
UK Singles (Official Charts)	1
US Billboard Hot 100	15
US Adult Alternative Airplay (Billboard)	1
US Adult Contemporary (Billboard)	27
US Adult Pop Airplay (Billboard)	5
US Alternative Airplay (Billboard)	1
US Dance Club Songs (Billboard)	7
US Hot Rock & Alternative Songs (Billboard)	3
US Pop Airplay (Billboard)	35

=== Monthly charts ===
Monthly chart performance
Chart (2011)	Peak position
South Korea International (Gaon)	24

=== Year-end charts ===
Year-end chart performance
Chart (2011)	Position
Australia (ARIA)	54
Belgium (Ultratop 50 Flanders)	47
Belgium (Ultratop 50 Wallonia)	72
Germany (Official German Charts)	61
Hungary (Rádiós Top 40)	85
Italy (Musica e dischi)	13
Italy Airplay (EarOne)	27
Netherlands (Dutch Top 40)	17
Netherlands (Single Top 100)	25
New Zealand (Recorded Music NZ)	32
Spain (PROMUSICAE)	43
Switzerland (Schweizer Hitparade)	34
UK Singles (OCC)	39

Chart (2012)	Position
Australia (ARIA)	24
Brazil (Crowley)	7
Canada (Canadian Hot 100)	80
France (SNEP)	50
Hungary (Rádiós Top 40)	52
Israel (Media Forest)	11
Italy (FIMI)	68
Netherlands (Dutch Top 40)	86
Netherlands (Download Top 100)	88
New Zealand (Recorded Music NZ)	49
Sweden (Sverigetopplistan)	98
Switzerland (Schweizer Hitparade)	65
UK Singles (OCC)	45
US Billboard Hot 100	69
US Adult Top 40 (Billboard)	22
US Hot Rock Songs (Billboard)	18

Chart (2013)	Position
France (SNEP)	179
UK Singles (OCC)	185

=== Decade-end charts ===
Decade-end chart performance
Chart (2010–2019)	Position
Australia (ARIA)	69

== Certifications and sales ==
Certifications and sales
Region	Certification	Certified units/sales
Australia (ARIA)	6× Platinum	420,000^{^}
Belgium (BRMA)	Gold	15,000^{*}
Brazil (Pro-Música Brasil)	Platinum	60,000^{‡}
Canada (Music Canada)	3× Platinum	240,000^{*}
Denmark (IFPI Danmark)	2× Platinum	180,000^{‡}
France (SNEP)	Gold	150,000^{*}
Germany (BVMI)	Platinum	600,000 (Note: German certified sales for "Paradise" as of December 2023.)
Italy (FIMI)	3× Platinum	90,000^{‡}
Mexico (AMPROFON)	Platinum	60,000^{*}
New Zealand (RMNZ)	6× Platinum	180,000^{‡}
Portugal (AFP)	2× Platinum	40,000^{‡}
Spain (Promusicae)	2× Platinum	120,000^{‡}
United Kingdom (BPI)	4× Platinum	2,400,000^{‡}
United States (RIAA)	3× Platinum	3,519,628 (Note: American pure sales for "Paradise" as of February 2016.)
Streaming
Denmark (IFPI Danmark)	Platinum	1,800,000^{†}
^{*} Sales figures based on certification alone.^{^} Shipments figures based on certification alone.^{‡} Sales+streaming figures based on certification alone.^{†} Streaming-only figures based on certification alone.

== Release history ==
Release dates and formats
Region	Date	Format	Label	Ref.
Italy	12 September 2011	Contemporary hit radio	Warner Music	
United Kingdom	12 September 2011	Digital download	Parlophone	
United States	12 September 2011	Digital download	Parlophone	
United States	26 September 2011	Adult album alternative radio	Capitol	
United States	27 September 2011	Modern rock radio	Capitol	
United States	3 October 2011	Hot adult contemporary radio	Capitol	
United States	4 October 2011	Contemporary hit radio	Capitol	

== See also ==
- List of top 10 singles for 2011 in Australia
- List of top 10 singles in 2011 (France)
- List of top 10 singles for 2012 in Australia
- List of Billboard number-one adult alternative singles of the 2010s
- List of number-one songs of the 2010s (Czech Republic)
- List of UK singles chart number ones of the 2010s
