= Prospekt's March/Poppyfields =

2008 song by Coldplay

Song by Coldplay

from the EP Prospekt's March
- Released: 21 November 2008
- Recorded: 2006–2008
- Genre: Alternative rock; ambient music; baroque pop
- Length: 3:39 (2:55/0:42)
- Label: Parlophone; Capitol
- Songwriters: Guy Berryman; Jonny Buckland; Will Champion; Chris Martin
- Producers: Markus Dravs; Brian Eno; Rik Simpson; Jon Hopkins

"Prospekt's March/Poppyfields" are two songs by British rock band Coldplay that are included on the same track. They were written by all members of the band for their fourth album, Viva la Vida or Death and All His Friends but neither song made it to the final tracklist, so they ended up on the Prospekt's March EP. The song "Prospekt's March" is built around acoustic guitars, an atmospheric synthesizer and vocals. The second song, "Poppyfields" is a short instrumental.

== Writing and composition ==
The track has two different songs, like many others on the Viva la Vida album, such as "Lovers in Japan/Reign of Love". "Prospekt's March" is the main song and "Poppyfields" is a short, ambient instrumental piece. The songs are often considered to be a single-song medley as one unit. The band once explained that one of the reasons to put two songs in the same track was to add a bit of value, so it would have "enough value for money".

The name "Poppyfields" was first revealed in September 2007 when Coldplay published a note signed as "Prospekt". The name "Prospekt's March" appeared for the first time in December of the same year, signed by the same pseudonym.

== Charts ==
Weekly chart performance
Chart (2008)	Peak position
UK Singles Chart	182
Finland (Suomen virallinen lista)	15
