= Yes (Coldplay song) =

Song by Coldplay

from the album Viva la Vida or Death and All His Friends
- Released: 12 June 2008
- Studio: The Bakery (London)
- Genre: Alternative rock
- Length: 7:06
- Label: Parlophone
- Songwriters: Guy Berryman; Jonny Buckland; Will Champion; Chris Martin

"Yes" is a song by the British rock band Coldplay from their fourth studio album, Viva la Vida or Death and All His Friends (2008). It is the sixth track on the album and includes the hidden song "Chinese Sleep Chant". The song was produced by Brian Eno, Markus Dravs, and Rik Simpson.

== Background and recording ==
Coldplay recorded their fourth album, Viva la Vida or Death and All His Friends, in 2007 and 2008 with producers Brian Eno, Markus Dravs and Rik Simpson; the album was released on 12 June 2008. "Yes" is the sixth song on the album, immediately followed (on the same track) by the hidden song "Chinese Sleep Chant", beginning around the 4-minute mark. "Chinese Sleep Chant" is unlisted on the album sleeve.

== Composition and lyrics ==
"Yes" is characterized by its distinctive musical and vocal style, with Chris Martin singing in a dramatically lower register than his usual falsetto. A prominent string section is present throughout "Yes", performed by Italian musician Davide Rossi on electric violin.

After approximately four minutes of "Yes", the hidden track "Chinese Sleep Chant" begins. In contrast to the restrained, strings-laden rock of "Yes", "Chinese Sleep Chant" is an uptempo, shoegaze-inspired piece. NME described the track as "powered by crunching guitar riffs, thumping Will Champion drums and, amidst the swirling sonic boom, heavenly falsetto vocals."

== Reception ==
Upon the album's release, "Yes" (with "Chinese Sleep Chant") drew commentary for its bold stylistic departures. The Guardian's Kitty Empire highlighted Martin's unexpected vocal turn, quipping that on "Yes" he "discovers his inner Barry White" amid "Arabic strings", an experiment that helped keep the album "strange [and] arty" while still recognizably Coldplay. PopMatters described "Yes" as a "remarkably strange trip down post-Britpop England", noting the mix of a Thom Yorke-like moody verse and Oasis-like big chorus, and considered the track evidence that Coldplay were indulging in new sounds thanks to their ample studio budget and Eno's guidance. The Village Voice critic Tom Breihan regarded the hidden segment "Chinese Sleep Chant" as a convincing imitation of My Bloody Valentine's signature style, complete with "heavily processed guitar-swirl" and mumbled falsetto vocals, albeit essentially a "rip" done with enough craft to be credible. Pitchfork's review was more mixed; while acknowledging the shoegaze direction, reviewer Ryan Dombal called "Chinese Sleep Chant" merely "passable" and easily traceable to its influences rather than truly transformative.

Some journalists appreciated the song's place in the album's dynamics. In an overview of Coldplay's work, NME later ranked "Chinese Sleep Chant" as an underrated deep cut, praising its "driving" energy and the contrast it provided on the record. On the other hand, a few critics were less enthusiastic about "Yes" in the context of the album. Andy Gill of The Independent felt that, like much of Viva la Vida, the track's experimental touches did not fully mask the band's reliance on repetition and simple melodies.

== Credits ==
Coldplay

- Chris Martin – lead vocals, keyboards, guitar
- Jonny Buckland – lead guitar
- Guy Berryman – bass guitar
- Will Champion – drums, percussion, backing vocals

Additional personnel

- Davide Rossi – electric violin and string arrangement
- Brian Eno – production, sonic experimentation
- Markus Dravs – production
- Rik Simpson – production, engineering
