= Strawberry Swing =

2009 single by Coldplay

Single by Coldplay

from the album Viva la Vida or Death and All His Friends
- Released: 14 September 2009
- Recorded: December 2007
- Genre: Alternative rock; soft rock; folk-pop
- Length: 4:11 (album version); 4:09 (radio edit)
- Label: Parlophone; Capitol
- Songwriters: Guy Berryman; Jonny Buckland; Will Champion; Chris Martin
- Producers: Markus Dravs; Brian Eno; Jon Hopkins; Rik Simpson

Coldplay singles chronology
"Life in Technicolor II" (2009)	"Strawberry Swing" (2009)	"Christmas Lights" (2010)

Music video
- "Strawberry Swing" on YouTube

"Strawberry Swing" is a song by British rock band Coldplay. It was released on 14 September 2009 as the fourth and final single from the band's fourth studio album, Viva la Vida or Death and All His Friends (2008). The song was written by the members of the band and was produced by Markus Dravs, Brian Eno, Jon Hopkins and Rik Simpson. The track received generally positive reviews from music critics who praised the infectious melody, the vocal performance of frontman Chris Martin and the west-African influences on the track's arrangement and production.

"Strawberry Swing" reached a position of 158 on the UK Singles Chart and reached position 5 on both the Polish Singles Chart and the Dutch Tipparade charts. The song received a stop-motion music video directed by Shynola, which was nominated for Breakthrough Video at the 2010 MTV Video Music Awards. Coldplay performed the song on their 2008 Viva la Vida Tour, and a live version of the song appeared on Coldplay's live album, LeftRightLeftRightLeft (2009).

The song was performed in the 2012 Summer Paralympics closing ceremony, with the British Paraorchestra. R&B singer-songwriter Frank Ocean released a cover version of the song on his 2011 mixtape Nostalgia, Ultra to positive reviews from critics, and later performed it during his 2012 Coachella Music Festival appearance and his 2012 Channel Orange tour.

== Background ==
"Strawberry Swing", like much of Viva la Vida, was primarily produced by English record producer Brian Eno. The track was released as the fifth official single from Viva la Vida on 14 September 2009. The song was later part of the international soundtrack to the Brazilian soap opera Tempos Modernos in 2009.

Results of a study by the British Academy of Sound Therapy show that "Strawberry Swing" is one of the most psychologically relaxing songs ever recorded. It came in 5th place among surveyed songs behind Marconi Union's "Weightless".

== Composition ==
Strawberry Swing
Excerpt from the song

"Strawberry Swing" contains multiple elements of Touareg, afro-pop and highlife music, and is largely built around handclaps, plucked, clean guitars, rhythmic cellos and distant organs and keys. Lead singer Chris Martin credits much of the track's sound to his time in Zimbabwe as an adolescent. "My mum comes from Zimbabwe, so I spent a lot of time there. I used to work in a studio [Shed Studios] where people played [highlife, afrobeat]." Martin has also noted English alternative dance band Delakota's influence on the track, pointing to the 1998 track "The Rock" as specific inspiration.

Alexis Petrdis of The Guardian stated the track had "certainly a wider sonic palette on offer", musing that the song contained a "jerkily funky beat and a vaguely African-sounding guitar line", though also noted many of the track's shared traits with Coldplay's previous discography; namely its mid-tempo, echoing guitars, piano ballad-inspired melodies and bittersweet, anthemic, falsetto vocals.

== Reception ==
The song received mostly positive reviews from music critics. Stephen Thomas Erlewine of AllMusic stated that the track, with its light, "gently infectious melody and insistent rhythmic pulse, breaks from the album's appealingly meditative murk". Chris Willman of Entertainment Weekly described the song as "ebullient", and mused that the track "throws Afrocentric guitar atop one of those Eno/Dravs soundscapes beautifully". Pitchfork Media's Ryan Dombal reported that "the Gabriel connection is also apparent on the spectacular, wide-eyed 'Strawberry Swing', which floats light tribal drums above circular guitars and Martin's idyllic musings." Evan Sawdey of PopMatters wrote that the guitar playing that populate "Violet Hill" and "Strawberry Swing" sound "like that for the first time in the band's career, Coldplay is actually using the ludicrous studio budget that they're provided with each for release, here indulging in every passing whim and fancy, all while Eno serves as the playground supervisor, the results proving to be as potent as they are varied." IGN's Chad Grischow wrote that the track "blends spectacularly with Martin's calming, 'It's such a perfect day', refrain" and noted that "when the jangling acoustic guitar drifts in near the conclusion, it is the cherry on top of a killer tune". PopMatters included the song on their unranked "Best Singles of 2009" list.

== Promotion ==
=== Music video ===
Screenshot from the video making reference to the Viva la Vida or Death and All His Friends album cover.

The music video for "Strawberry Swing" was directed by Shynola and premiered via Babelgum on 20 July 2009. Odeon Cinemas also screened it before showings of Brüno and The Proposal in the United Kingdom on 22 July. Television broadcasts began on 29 July through 4Music and Channel 4. The visuals were animated using stop motion, featuring Chris Martin lying on the ground against animated chalk drawings that tell a surreal story with him as the main character. The story begins with Martin waking up in his house. Once he sees that a woman is being held hostage by a giant squirrel, he turns into a superhero and attempts to save her. Along the way, Martin faces attacks from the squirrel and a giant fish in the ocean. When Martin finally gets to the squirrel's home, he rescues the lady by drawing a nut-shaped bomb that blows the squirrel up in a colorful explosion. The two then fly away into space together and begin to kiss. At the end of the song, the animation stops and Martin gets up off the chalk-colored floor in real speed and walks away. The video was nominated in the Best Animation in a Video category at the UK Music Video Awards 2009. In August 2010, the video was nominated for "Breakthrough Video" at the 2010 MTV Video Music Awards.

In September 2009, the originality of the Shynola-directed video was questioned by singer-songwriter Andy J Gallagher; he argued that "Owen Trevor had virtually the same idea at least a year before". In an official PDF statement, Shynola stated "Having never seen Mr. Trevor's video before, we can categorically deny that his video was any influence on our video. Any similarities are purely coincidental." The PDF also contained image-by-image rebuttals of Gallagher's claims, and added that the video was mainly inspired by the "dreamlike weirdness" of animator Winsor McCay's artwork.

=== Live performances ===
Coldplay performed the song from 2008 to 2010 as part of their Viva la Vida Tour. A performance of the song was featured on the LeftRightLeftRightLeft live album released by Coldplay in 2009. The song was also performed it during their performance at the 2012 Summer Paralympics closing ceremony featuring the British Paraorchestra. The band also performed the song as a requested song by the audience on their A Head Full of Dreams Tour and Music of the Spheres World Tours, at the shows on 11 June 2016 and 25 March 2023, respectively.

== Frank Ocean cover ==
"Strawberry Swing"

Song by Frank Ocean

from the album Nostalgia, Ultra
- Released: February 16, 2011
- Recorded: 2010
- Length: 3:55
- Label: Self-released
- Songwriters: Christopher Breaux; Guy Berryman; Jonny Buckland; Will Champion; Chris Martin

Singer-songwriter Frank Ocean performed an alternative R&B cover version of the song on his 2011 mixtape Nostalgia, Ultra. AbsolutePunk's Holly Hox called Ocean's version "catchy", musing that it "proves that Ocean's voice is as great as his knack for writing thoughtful pop songs." Connor O'Neill of The Miscellany News writes that "there is so much atmosphere you almost melt into it, and he spreads you over an apocalyptic swan song." Music critic Robert Christgau felt that Ocean's cover was superior to the original, stating that it's "where the alienated young R&B pro rewrites the sappy Coldplay single without underplaying its lyricism or, as promised, its nostalgia. 'I've loved the good times here' is a sendoff worthy of the 'dying world' Ocean calls home." Ocean performed his cover of the song during his 2011 Nostalgia Ultra tour, and his 2012 Channel Orange tour through North America. Complex praised his performance, writing that Ocean's "voice sounds as buttery live as it does on record."

== Track listing ==
Digital download
No.	Title	Length
1.	"Strawberry Swing"	4:09

Promotional CD Single
No.	Title	Length
1.	"Strawberry Swing" (Radio Edit)	4:09
2.	"Strawberry Swing" (Album version)	4:11
3.	"Strawberry Swing" (Instrumental)	4:11

== Personnel ==
Coldplay

- Chris Martin – lead vocals, acoustic guitar, piano, keyboards
- Guy Berryman – bass guitar, synthesizers
- Jonny Buckland – electric guitar
- Will Champion – drums, percussion, backing vocals

Additional Personnel

- Brian Eno – sonic landscapes
- Davide Rossi – strings
- Mike Kezner – sitar

== Charts ==
Weekly chart performance
Chart (2010)	Peak position
Iceland (RÚV)	2
Netherlands (Dutch Top 40 Tipparade)	5
UK Singles Chart	158
