= LeftRightLeftRightLeft =

2009 live album by Coldplay

Live album by Coldplay
- Released: 15 May 2009
- Recorded: 2008–2009
- Genre: Alternative rock
- Length: 39:54
- Labels: Parlophone; Capitol
- Producer: Rik Simpson

Coldplay chronology
Prospekt's March (2008)	LeftRightLeftRightLeft (2009)	Mylo Xyloto (2011)

LeftRightLeftRightLeft is the second live album by British rock band Coldplay. It was released on 15 May 2009 as a free download on their website, with physical copies being distributed in all of the succeeding dates from the Viva la Vida Tour. Before Live 2012 was made available, however, the album was removed from the band's website. On 13 August 2021, nearly twelve years after its initial release, the album was made available on streaming services.

Regarding the limited release, Chris Martin stated that the purpose was to show gratitude: "Although it's live, it's supposed to be a real album, part of our canon. Y'know, as well as being a gift move, it is also a musical move. It's meant to say that this is what we sound like at the moment". Within six days, it was downloaded 3.5 million times.

The band also noted that "playing live is what we love" and that the album is "a thank you to our fans", who are "the people who give us a reason to do it and make it happen". The material used was "recorded in over 101 locations", with producer Dan Green picking the tracks he thought were the best along with Coldplay's creative director Phil Harvey.

== Artwork ==
The physical album cover features a green butterfly on the front and a pink butterfly on the back, reminiscent of the butterfly-shaped confetti used during the concert tour while the band performed "Lovers in Japan" and "Viva la Vida".

== Critical reception ==
In a positive review for Pitchfork, Stephen M. Deusner said the album "showcases a band much more comfortable and commanding on stage" in comparison to Live 2003. Paul Kirkley from Record Collector rated the record 4/5 stars in a retrospective piece, stating it was Coldplay's pupa phase, "when they've outgrown their indie origins" but had not yet "become the world's biggest band".

== Track listing ==
All tracks written by Coldplay (Guy Berryman, Jonny Buckland, Will Champion and Chris Martin).

LeftRightLeftRightLeft track listing
No.	Title	Original album	Length
1.	"Glass of Water"	Prospekt's March (2008)	4:44
2.	"42"	Viva la Vida or Death and All His Friends (2008)	4:52
3.	"Clocks"	A Rush of Blood to the Head (2002)	4:40
4.	"Strawberry Swing"	Viva la Vida or Death and All His Friends	4:16
5.	"The Hardest Part/Postcards from Far Away"	X&Y (2005) / Prospekt's March	4:15
6.	"Viva la Vida"	Viva la Vida or Death and All His Friends	5:24
7.	"Death Will Never Conquer"	"Viva la Vida" single (2008)	1:39
8.	"Fix You"	X&Y	5:38
9.	"Death and All His Friends"	Viva la Vida or Death and All His Friends	4:24

Notes

- Tracks 1, 5, 7 and 8 were recorded in Sydney, 2009.
- Tracks 2, 3, 4 and 9 were recorded in Madrid, 2008.
- Track 6 was recorded in Paris, 2008.
- Mixed at the Bakery, mastered at Gateway.

== Personnel ==
Coldplay

- Guy Berryman – bass guitar, backing vocals, mandolin ("Death Will Never Conquer")
- Jonny Buckland – electric guitar, backing vocals, keyboards, tambourine ("Death Will Never Conquer")
- Will Champion – drums, percussion, backing vocals; lead vocals & acoustic guitar ("Death Will Never Conquer")
- Chris Martin – lead vocals, piano, acoustic guitar, keyboards; harmonica ("Death Will Never Conquer")

Technical personnel

- Dan Green – production, mixing
- Rik Simpson – production, mixing
- Tony Smith – recording assistant
- Andy Rugg – mixing assistant
- Bob Ludwig – mastering

== Release history ==
Release history and formats
Region	Date	Format	Label	Ref.
Various	15 May 2009	CD · digital download	Parlophone · Capitol · EMI	
Various	13 August 2021	Streaming	Parlophone · Atlantic · Warner Music	
