= Death and All His Friends =

2008 song by Coldplay

Song by Coldplay

from the album Viva la Vida or Death and All His Friends
- Released: 11 June 2008
- Genre: Art rock
- Length: 3:34; 6:18 (with "The Escapist")
- Label: Parlophone; Capitol
- Songwriters: Guy Berryman; Jonny Buckland; Will Champion; Chris Martin
- Producers: Markus Dravs; Brian Eno; Jon Hopkins; Rik Simpson

"Death and All His Friends" is a song by British rock band Coldplay. It was written by all members of the band for their fourth album, Viva la Vida or Death and All His Friends, and is the tenth and final track on the album. The song begins with Chris Martin singing softly to a piano accompaniment before morphing into an uplifting arrangement featuring drums, chiming guitars, and a choir recorded in an art gallery in Barcelona. After the song fades out, a hidden song featured on the album, entitled "The Escapist", brings the total length of the track up to over six minutes and concludes the album.

"The Escapist" is an ambient music piece that consists of a sample of "Light Through the Veins" by Jon Hopkins, with different mixing and with added vocals and lyrics by Chris Martin. A brief 40-second section of the instrumental of "The Escapist" is what begins the first track on the album, "Life in Technicolor", making the album cyclical. A live version of "Death and All His Friends" was featured on the band's 2009 live album, LeftRightLeftRightLeft.

== Writing and composition ==
The "quiet half" of the song was originally a separate song altogether named "School". "School" was originally intended to be an introduction to another Coldplay song entitled "Rainy Day" that was later featured on the Prospekt's March EP. However, "School" was eventually re-worked into the current state of "Death and All His Friends". Singer Chris Martin also revealed in an interview for MTV that the name of the song was supposed to be the theme of the album. He said, "We're aware of all the bad stuff in life, you know, but that doesn't mean you should ever give in to it, you know? So we all sing that bit together really loudly, as kind of a message to ourselves: never giving up and never focusing on the bad stuff too much". As the band worked on the song, producer Brian Eno was the most obsessed with finishing it, creating the line "I don't want a cycle of recycled revenge". Recording was carried out in several different cities around the world, including Barcelona, London and New York City, taking several months for it to be finalized.

== Reception ==
In 2014, Consequence ranked "The Escapist" segment of "Death and All His Friends" among the 20 Best Hidden Tracks on Albums, at number seven.

== Credits and personnel ==
- Chris Martin – composer, performer
- Guy Berryman – composer, performer
- Jonny Buckland – composer, performer
- Will Champion – composer, performer

== Charts ==
Weekly chart performance
Chart (2008)	Peak position
Swedish Charts	50
UK Singles Chart	183

== Certifications ==
Certifications
Region	Certification	Certified units/sales
Brazil (Pro-Música Brasil)	Platinum	60,000^{*}
^{*} Sales figures based on certification alone.
