= Life in Technicolor II =

2009 single by Coldplay

Single by Coldplay

from the EP Prospekt's March
- B-side: "Life in Technicolor II" (live @ The O2, London); "The Goldrush"
- Released: 2 February 2009
- Recorded: 2008
- Genre: Alternative rock; baroque pop
- Length: 4:05 (EP version); 3:37 (radio edit)
- Label: Parlophone; Capitol
- Songwriters: Guy Berryman; Jonny Buckland; Will Champion; Chris Martin
- Producers: Markus Dravs; Brian Eno; Jon Hopkins; Rik Simpson

Coldplay singles chronology
"Lost!" (2008)	"Life in Technicolor II" (2009)	"Strawberry Swing" (2009)

Music video
- "Life in Technicolor II" on YouTube

"Life in Technicolor"

Instrumental by Coldplay

from the album Viva la Vida or Death and All His Friends
- Released: 12 June 2008
- Genre: Alternative rock; baroque pop; instrumental rock
- Length: 2:30
- Label: Parlophone; Capitol
- Songwriters: Guy Berryman; Johnny Buckland; Will Champion; Chris Martin; Jon Hopkins

"Life in Technicolor II" (stylised as "Life in Technicolor ii") is a song by British rock band Coldplay released as the first single from the Prospekt's March EP. It is the full-vocal version of the instrumental track "Life in Technicolor", from the band's fourth studio album, Viva la Vida or Death and All His Friends. The songs starts with a loop consisting of a santoor accompanied by tabla-like percussion. The loop is then repeated through the verses and part of the chorus.

A promotional CD single was released in December 2008 while the 7-inch vinyl and digital download came out on 2 February 2009. While the promotional CD includes two different edits of the song ("Radio edit" and "Prospekt's March Version"), the vinyl includes a previously unreleased and unheard track called "The Goldrush"; it is one of the few Coldplay songs featuring lead vocals by drummer Will Champion. The track was nominated for Best Rock Performance by a Duo or Group with Vocal and Best Music Video at the 52nd Annual Grammy Awards.

== Music video ==
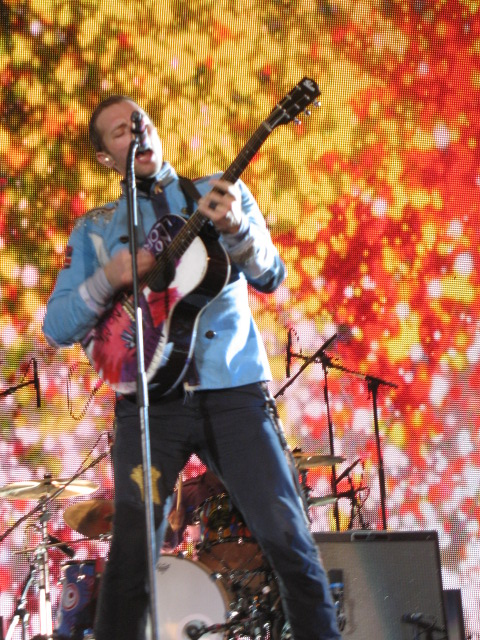
Coldplay performing "Life in Technicolor II" at the Parque Simon Bolivar, Bogotá, Colombia, on March 4, 2010

The music video premiered on 20 January 2009 on 4Music and Channel 4. The director of this video is Dougal Wilson. It starts out with a group of children sitting and awaiting a traditional Punch and Judy puppet show in the Aldenham War Memorial Hall. Suddenly, the band appears as puppets "onstage" and begins performing the song, which confuses and somewhat unsettles the children and the adults in the room. A girl in the audience recognizes the band members as she looks back and forth between them and the cover of a book she is holding, which is a fictional "unofficial biography" of Coldplay called Playin' It Cool. The puppet show becomes increasingly extravagant as the video goes on, eventually featuring pyrotechnics, frontman Chris Martin crowd surfing over the children, and Punch and Judy performing motorcycle stunts across the stage. Finally, after finishing the song, the puppet band members board a miniature helicopter and after taking off, drummer Will Champion tosses his drumsticks to the girl in the audience before the helicopter crashes through a window as they fly away. The girl looks down at the tiny drumsticks in her hands and smiles. James Clarkson and Coldplay's fifth member, Phil Harvey, can be seen in the video.

== Reception ==
"Life in Technicolor ii" was nominated for Best Art Direction in a Video and Best Visual Effects in a Video at the UK Music Video Awards 2009, in addition to Best Music Video at the 52nd Annual Grammy Awards. Pitchfork included it on their "Top Music Videos of 2009" year-end ranking. NPO Radio 2 ranked the song at number 418 on Top 2000 that same year. In 2010, it was featured on The Xfm Top 1000 Songs of All Time book.

== In popular culture ==
The short instrumental version of this song (released on Viva la Vida) can be heard as the film Night at the Museum: Battle of the Smithsonian ends during a scene with Ben Stiller and Amy Adams. It was also used on Sky Sports' "Ford Super Sunday" coverage during the 2008/2009 as well as "Match of the Day" during the same season. This version was used at the beginning of the Great Yarmouth (UK) Hippodrome Circus show 2009. NFL Network also used it for their coverage of the 2009 NFL Scouting Combine and also for their coverage of the 2009 NFL draft. The song was also played during the opening montage of the 2009 ESPY Awards. The instrumental version of the song is used in London Eye's pre-flight 4D Experience show. A portion of the instrumental version is also used in Apple Inc.'s introduction of the 2008 MacBook Air, as well as the introduction of the Late 08 MacBook. The song was also used in a promotional on Public Broadcasting Service (PBS) for PBS's primary programming. Life in Technicolor II was used in an advertisement for Wimbledon 2013 on ESPN.

== Track listing ==
Digital download
No.	Title	Length
1.	"Life in Technicolor II"	4:05
2.	"Life in Technicolor II" (Live at The O2, London)	3:36
3.	"The Goldrush"	2:29

7-inch vinyl
No.	Title	Length
1.	"Life in Technicolor II"	4:05
2.	"The Goldrush"	2:29

== Personnel ==
- Chris Martin – composer, performer
- Guy Berryman – composer, performer
- Jonny Buckland – composer, performer
- Will Champion – composer, performer
- Jon Hopkins – organ, harmonium, synthesizers
- Mike Kezner – sitar
- Davide Rossi – strings

== Charts ==
=== Weekly charts ===
Weekly chart performance
Chart (2008–2009)	Peak position
Austria (Ö3 Austria Top 40)	53
Belgium (Ultratop 50 Flanders)	39
Belgium (Ultratip Bubbling Under Wallonia)	2
CIS Airplay (TopHit)	151
Iceland (RÚV)	5
Ireland (IRMA)	29
Mexico Ingles Airplay	5
Netherlands (Dutch Top 40)	15
Netherlands (Single Top 100)	30
Switzerland (Schweizer Hitparade)	39
UK Singles (Official Charts)	28
US Adult Alternative Airplay (Billboard)	1
US Adult Pop Airplay (Billboard)	19
US Alternative Airplay (Billboard)	21

=== Year-end charts ===
Year-end chart performance
Chart (2009)	Position
Japan Adult Contemporary (Billboard)	70
Netherlands (Dutch Top 40)	71

== Release history ==
Release dates and formats
Region	Date	Format
United Kingdom	December 2008	Promotional CD
United Kingdom	20 January 2009	Music video (airplay)
Various	20 January 2009	Music video (YouTube streaming)
United Kingdom	30 January 2009	Digital download
Netherlands	30 January 2009	Digital download
United Kingdom	2 February 2009	7" vinyl

== See also ==
- List of Billboard number-one adult alternative singles of the 2000s
