= List of Billboard number-one adult alternative singles of the 2000s =

Adult Alternative Airplay, also known as Triple A, is a record chart that ranks the most-played songs on American adult album alternative radio stations. Formulated based on each song's weekly total plays, the chart was introduced in the January 20, 1996 issue of Radio & Records magazine. Adult Alternative Songs, along with other Radio & Records airplay charts, was initially compiled using radio airplay data from Mediabase. In August 2006, Radio & Records was acquired by The Nielsen Company – then known as VNU Media – parent company of rival publication Billboard. Following the purchase, Nielsen Broadcast Data Systems replaced Mediabase in monitoring airplay for charts, beginning with the issue dated August 11, 2006. Billboard themselves introduced the chart in their July 5, 2008 issue, appropriating the same Nielsen data, and became its sole publisher after Radio & Records ceased publication in June 2009.

The Billboard website currently lists Adult Alternative Songs charts dating back to January 1996. These charts are based on data from a Triple A chart that had previously been published in the Billboard-owned Airplay Monitor magazine from that date until the acquisition of Radio & Records, and which had used Nielsen data that was largely similar to the Mediabase data used in the Radio & Records chart.

On the Billboard Adult Alternative Songs decade-end chart, "Use Somebody" by American rock band Kings of Leon, which originally topped the chart for two weeks in 2009, ranked as the overall top single of the 2000s. The decade-end top artist was English alternative rock band Coldplay, who scored eight number-one adult alternative singles during the 2000s.

== Number-one singles ==
Key
† – Billboard year-end number-one single
‡ – Billboard decade-end number-one single
↑ – Return of a single to number one

Single	Artist	Reached number one	Weeks at number one
"The Great Beyond"	R.E.M.	December 25, 1999	8
"Telling Stories"	Tracy Chapman	February 19, 2000	8
"Steal My Kisses"	Ben Harper and the Innocent Criminals	April 15, 2000	3
"Desert Rose"†	Sting featuring Cheb Mami	May 6, 2000	4
"Bent"	Matchbox Twenty	June 3, 2000	14
"Babylon"	David Gray	September 9, 2000	2
"Beautiful Day"	U2	September 23, 2000	16
"Sleepwalker"	The Wallflowers	January 13, 2001	1
"Easy Tonight"	Five for Fighting	January 20, 2001	1
"I Did It"	Dave Matthews Band	January 27, 2001	5
"Camera One"	Josh Joplin Band	March 3, 2001	2
"Superman Inside"	Eric Clapton	March 17, 2001	1
"Drops of Jupiter (Tell Me)"†	Train	March 24, 2001	12
"Imitation of Life"	R.E.M.	June 16, 2001	3
"Drops of Jupiter (Tell Me)" ↑†	Train	July 7, 2001	2
"The Space Between"	Dave Matthews Band	July 21, 2001	1
"When You're Falling"	Afro Celt Sound System featuring Peter Gabriel	July 28, 2001	6
"Life on a Chain"	Pete Yorn	September 8, 2001	6
"Peaceful World"	John Mellencamp featuring India Arie	October 20, 2001	1
"Stuck in a Moment You Can't Get Out Of"	U2	October 27, 2001	1
"Peaceful World" ↑	John Mellencamp featuring India Arie	November 3, 2001	4
"New York, New York"	Ryan Adams	December 1, 2001	2
"No Such Thing"	John Mayer	December 15, 2001	1
"New York, New York" ↑	Ryan Adams	December 22, 2001	1
"Everyday"	Dave Matthews Band	December 29, 2001	8
"Let Me Down Easy"	Chris Isaak	February 23, 2002	4
"Strange Condition"	Pete Yorn	March 23, 2002	1
"In a Little While"	U2	March 30, 2002	1
"Strange Condition" ↑	Pete Yorn	April 6, 2002	1
"Soak Up the Sun"	Sheryl Crow	April 13, 2002	7
"Flake"†	Jack Johnson	June 1, 2002	3
"American Girls"	Counting Crows	June 22, 2002	1
"Where Are You Going"	Dave Matthews Band	July 6, 2002	4
"The Rising"	Bruce Springsteen	August 3, 2002	3
"Where Are You Going" ↑	Dave Matthews Band	August 24, 2002	3
"Your Body Is a Wonderland"	John Mayer	September 14, 2002	2
"In My Place"	Coldplay	September 28, 2002	3
"Electrical Storm"	U2	October 19, 2002	6
"When You're on Top"	The Wallflowers	November 30, 2002	1
"The Zephyr Song"	Red Hot Chili Peppers	December 7, 2002	5
"Clocks"†	Coldplay	January 11, 2003	15
"The Remedy (I Won't Worry)"	Jason Mraz	April 26, 2003	2
"Peacekeeper"	Fleetwood Mac	May 10, 2003	1
"Calling All Angels"	Train	May 17, 2003	2
"The Horizon Has Been Defeated"	Jack Johnson	May 31, 2003	2
"Calling All Angels" ↑	Train	June 14, 2003	1
"The Horizon Has Been Defeated" ↑	Jack Johnson	June 21, 2003	1
"Calling All Angels" ↑	Train	June 28, 2003	6
"Amsterdam"	Guster	August 9, 2003	2
"Smoothie Song"	Nickel Creek	August 23, 2003	1
"Amsterdam" ↑	Guster	August 30, 2003	2
"Bigger than My Body"	John Mayer	September 13, 2003	5
"Bad Day"	R.E.M.	October 18, 2003	5
"Red Light"	Jonny Lang	November 22, 2003	1
"You and I Both"	Jason Mraz	November 29, 2003	1
"The First Cut Is the Deepest"	Sheryl Crow	December 6, 2003	3
"Perfect Time of Day"	Howie Day	December 27, 2003	1
"The First Cut Is the Deepest" ↑	Sheryl Crow	January 3, 2004	1
"She Don't Want Nobody Near"	Counting Crows	January 10, 2004	1
"Save Me"	Dave Matthews	January 17, 2004	3
"She Don't Want Nobody Near" ↑	Counting Crows	February 7, 2004	2
"Sunrise"†	Norah Jones	February 21, 2004	2
"Breathe"	Melissa Etheridge	March 6, 2004	2
"Sunrise" ↑†	Norah Jones	March 20, 2004	4
"Mad World"	Michael Andrews featuring Gary Jules	April 17, 2004	1
"Clarity"	John Mayer	April 24, 2004	1
"Cannonball"	Damien Rice	May 1, 2004	2
"Everything"	Alanis Morissette	May 15, 2004	4
"Oh"	Dave Matthews	June 12, 2004	4
"Accidentally in Love"	Counting Crows	July 10, 2004	2
"What Am I to You?"	Norah Jones	July 24, 2004	2
"Accidentally in Love" ↑	Counting Crows	August 7, 2004	3
"Gonna Be Some Changes Made"	Bruce Hornsby	August 28, 2004	3
"Leaving New York"	R.E.M.	September 18, 2004	4
"Vertigo"	U2	October 16, 2004	9
"Boulevard of Broken Dreams"	Green Day	December 18, 2004	9
"All Because of You"	U2	February 12, 2005	3
"Sitting, Waiting, Wishing"†	Jack Johnson	March 5, 2005	6
"Sometimes You Can't Make It on Your Own"	U2	April 16, 2005	5
"Speed of Sound"	Coldplay	May 21, 2005	9
"Good People"	Jack Johnson	July 23, 2005	10
"The One I Love"	David Gray	October 1, 2005	1
"Good Is Good"	Sheryl Crow	October 8, 2005	1
"The One I Love" ↑	David Gray	October 15, 2005	5
"Soul Meets Body"	Death Cab for Cutie	November 19, 2005	10
"Black Horse and the Cherry Tree"	KT Tunstall	January 28, 2006	3
"Talk"	Coldplay	February 18, 2006	1
"Upside Down" †	Jack Johnson	February 25, 2006	13
"Better Way"	Ben Harper	May 27, 2006	3
"Dani California"	Red Hot Chili Peppers	June 17, 2006	1
"Crazy"	Gnarls Barkley	June 24, 2006	6
"Saving Grace"	Tom Petty	August 5, 2006	1
"Waiting on the World to Change"	John Mayer	August 12, 2006	5
"Is It Any Wonder?"	Keane	September 16, 2006	2
"Waiting on the World to Change" ↑	John Mayer	September 30, 2006	1
"Chasing Cars"	Snow Patrol	October 7, 2006	1
"How to Save a Life"	The Fray	October 14, 2006	1
"Chasing Cars" ↑	Snow Patrol	October 21, 2006	7
"Window in the Skies"	U2	December 9, 2006	7
"See the World" †	Gomez	January 27, 2007	4
"New Shoes"	Paolo Nutini	February 24, 2007	5
"Thinking About You"	Norah Jones	March 31, 2007	3
"Read My Mind"	The Killers	April 21, 2007	6
"Better Than"	John Butler Trio	June 2, 2007	7
"Hey There Delilah"	Plain White T's	July 21, 2007	4
"Bubbly"	Colbie Caillat	August 18, 2007	3
"Hold On"	KT Tunstall	September 8, 2007	4
"Shut Your Eyes"	Snow Patrol	October 6, 2007	1
"Hold On" ↑	KT Tunstall	October 13, 2007	7
"You're the World to Me"	David Gray	December 1, 2007	8
"If I Had Eyes" †	Jack Johnson	January 26, 2008	10
"Supernatural Superserious"	R.E.M.	April 5, 2008	4
"You Can't Count on Me"	Counting Crows	May 3, 2008	1
"Supernatural Superserious" ↑	R.E.M.	May 10, 2008	1
"I Will Possess Your Heart"	Death Cab for Cutie	May 17, 2008	2
"Violet Hill"	Coldplay	May 31, 2008	2
"I Will Possess Your Heart" ↑	Death Cab for Cutie	June 14, 2008	2
"I'm Yours"	Jason Mraz	June 28, 2008	1
"I Will Possess Your Heart" ↑	Death Cab for Cutie	July 5, 2008	1
"Viva la Vida"	Coldplay	July 12, 2008	11
"Come Around"	Counting Crows	September 27, 2008	3
"Shattered (Turn the Car Around)"	O.A.R.	October 18, 2008	4
"Take Back the City"	Snow Patrol	November 15, 2008	1
"Lost!"	Coldplay	November 22, 2008	3
"Take Back the City" ↑	Snow Patrol	December 13, 2008	2
"Rock & Roll"	Eric Hutchinson	December 27, 2008	1
"You Found Me"	The Fray	January 3, 2009	5
"Get On Your Boots"	U2	February 7, 2009	4
"You Found Me" ↑	The Fray	March 7, 2009	2
"Crack the Shutters"	Snow Patrol	March 21, 2009	7
"Funny the Way It Is"	Dave Matthews Band	May 9, 2009	12
"Life in Technicolor II"	Coldplay	August 1, 2009	1
"Use Somebody" † ‡	Kings of Leon	August 8, 2009	1
"You Never Know"	Wilco	August 15, 2009	1
"Use Somebody" ↑ † ‡	Kings of Leon	August 22, 2009	1
"You Never Know"	Wilco	August 29, 2009	2
"Fugitive"	David Gray	September 12, 2009	10
"Who Says"	John Mayer	November 21, 2009	5
"Chasing Pirates"	Norah Jones	December 26, 2009	6
