= Prospekt's March =

2008 extended play by Coldplay

EP by Coldplay
- Released: 21 November 2008
- Recorded: 2006–2008
- Genre: Alternative rock
- Length: 27:32
- Labels: Parlophone; Capitol
- Producers: Markus Dravs; Brian Eno; Rik Simpson

Coldplay chronology
Viva la Vida or Death and All His Friends (2008)	Prospekt's March (2008)	LeftRightLeft; RightLeft (2009)

Singles from Prospekt's March
- 1. "Life in Technicolor II" Released: 2 February 2009

Prospekt's March is the seventh extended play by British rock band Coldplay and their first since Remixes (2003). It was released on 21 November 2008 in Europe and Japan, later released globally the following week. The EP features several left-over tracks from the Viva la Vida or Death and All His Friends studio sessions and was also made available in the album's deluxe edition.

The cover features Eugène Delacroix's original painting The Battle of Poitiers, similar to the cover art featured on Viva la Vida, which included another Delacroix painting, Liberty Leading the People. On 5 November, Coldplay offered an exclusive preview of the EP via their Facebook application and through their website. The song "Glass of Water" was released in anticipation for the project and entered the iTunes Top 100 songs, being also performed live by the band on 4Music.

Upon the EP's release, "Life in Technicolor II" entered the UK Singles Chart at number 90 despite not being a promotional effort. The band would later confirm the song as an official single and release its physical version on 8 February 2009, which made the track rise to a new peak of number 28. One year later, it was nominated for the 52nd Grammy Awards in the Best Rock Performance by a Duo or Group with Vocal and Best Short Form Music Video categories.

== Recording and release ==
Professional ratings
Aggregate scores
Source	Rating
Metacritic	67/100
Review scores
Source	Rating
AllMusic	3.5/5 stars
The A.V. Club	B
The Guardian	Mixed
NME	3/5 stars
Pitchfork	6.0/10
Rolling Stone	2.5/5 stars

Throughout the recording of Viva la Vida or Death and All His Friends, Coldplay communicated to fans through their website; further, some of the song titles were revealed during the recording. The name "Poppyfields" was first revealed in September 2007; in late October 2007, a message said that "Famous Old Painters" and "Glass of Water" had been written and were being considered for the album. "Prospekt's March" appeared for the first time in December of the same year; all the notes were signed by the pseudonym Prospekt, strengthening rumours that this would be the album's title. Those songs did not make it to the album's final track listing, so were featured on the Prospekt's March EP, except for "Famous Old Painters", which was never released.

In an interview for Coldplay's official website, frontman Chris Martin said that all the songs on the EP came very close to inclusion on Viva la Vida, and that they were "all part of the same family". In the same interview, the frontman stated that the idea was always to put these songs out by the end of 2008. Coldplay confirmed five songs for Prospekt's March on 3 October 2008, all of which had not been completed in time for Viva la Vida or Death and All His Friends. The playlist was changed to eight songs on 5 October. Six of the eight tracks are new recordings of the band.

== Commercial performance ==
The separate release of Prospekt's March was limited worldwide. EMI shipped 250,000 copies in its first week. The extended play debuted at number 15 on the US Billboard 200 with 76,723 units sold. In Japan, it debuted at number 141 with 1,416 copies sold. Four weeks later, it rose to number 15 with 10,379 copies.

== Track listing ==
All tracks are written by Coldplay, with production from Brian Eno, Markus Dravs and Rik Simpson, except where noted.

Prospekt's March track listing
No.	Title	Writer(s)	Length
1.	"Life in Technicolor II"		4:05
2.	"Postcards from Far Away"		0:48
3.	"Glass of Water"		4:44
4.	"Rainy Day"		3:26
5.	"Prospekt's March/Poppyfields"		3:39
6.	"Lost+" (featuring Jay-Z)	Coldplay; Shawn Carter	4:18
7.	"Lovers in Japan" (Osaka Sun Mix)		3:58
8.	"Now My Feet Won't Touch the Ground"		2:29
Total length:			27:32

iTunes bonus video
No.	Title	Length
9.	"Viva la Vida" (Anton Corbijn version)	4:08
Total length:		31:40

== Personnel ==
- Andy Rugg – assistant engineer, engineer
- Andy Wallace – mixing
- Bob Ludwig – mastering
- Brian Eno – producer, sonic landscapes
- Brian Thorn – assistant engineer, engineer
- Chris Martin – performer
- Dan Green – assistant engineer, engineer, photography
- Dave Holmes – management
- Davide Rossi – strings
- Dominic Monks – assistant engineer, engineer
- Emily Bart-Smith – additional vocals on "Rainy Day"
- Eugène Delacroix – cover painting
- François Chevallier – assistant engineer, engineer
- Guy Berryman – performer
- Jan Petrov – assistant engineer, engineer
- Jason Lader – assistant engineer, engineer
- Jay-Z – additional vocal on "Lost+"
- Jonny Buckland – performer
- Jon Hopkins – lightning, magic
- Kelly Pratt – brass
- Markus Dravs – mixing, producer
- Michael Brauer – mixing
- Michael Trepagnier – assistant engineer, engineer
- Olga Fitzroy – assistant engineer, engineer
- Phil Harvey – performer
- Rik Simpson – mixing, producer
- Stephan Crasneanscki – photography
- Tappin Gofton – art direction, design
- Vanessa Parr – assistant engineer, engineer
- Will Champion – performer
- William Paden Hensley – assistant engineer, engineer
- Young Guru – additional engineering on "Lost+"

== Charts ==
Weekly chart performance
Chart (2008–2023)	Peak position
Australian Albums (ARIA)	50
Austrian Albums (Ö3 Austria)	46
Belgian Albums (Ultratop Flanders)	162
Canadian Albums (Billboard)	18
Croatian International Albums (HDU)	15
Dutch Albums (Album Top 100)	79
Finnish Singles (Suomen virallinen lista) (Note: According to Musiikkituottajat rules, Prospekt's March was not eligible for the Finnish Albums chart.)	8
German Albums (Offizielle Top 100)	47
Irish Albums (IRMA)	36
Italian Albums (FIMI)	25
Japanese Albums (Oricon)	15
Japanese Top Album Sales (Billboard Japan)	23
Spanish Albums (Promusicae)	41
Swedish Albums (Sverigetopplistan)	39
UK Albums (Official Charts)	38
US Billboard 200	15
US Top Rock Albums (Billboard)	7

== Certifications and sales ==
Certifications and sales
Region	Certification	Certified units/sales
Japan	—	19,586 (Note: Japanese physical sales for Prospekt's March as of February 2009.)
United Kingdom (BPI)	Silver	60,000^{^}
^{^} Shipments figures based on certification alone.

== Release history ==
Release history and formats
Country	Date	Format
United States	24 November 2008	CD, vinyl, 2CD (album+EP)
Canada	24 November 2008	CD
United Kingdom	21 November 2008	CD, vinyl, 2CD (album+EP)
Australia	22 November 2008	CD, (album+EP)
Argentina	9 December 2008	CD, 2CD (album+EP)
Brazil	3 December 2008	CD
Japan	21 November 2008	Digital
Japan	17 December 2008	CD
Japan	14 January 2009	CDx2 (album+EP)
Taiwan	28 November 2008	CD, 2CD (album+EP)
Taiwan	5 December 2008	Vinyl
Spain	25 November 2008	CD
Sweden	21 November 2008	CD
Germany	21 November 2008	CD
Austria	21 November 2008	CD
Switzerland	21 November 2008	CD
Belgium	21 November 2008	CD
Netherlands	21 November 2008	CD
Ireland	21 November 2008	CD
Italy	21 November 2008	CD, 2CD (album+EP)
Denmark	21 November 2008	CD, EP
Norway	21 November 2008	CD
Pakistan	21 November 2008	CD
Finland	21 November 2008	CD
South Africa	21 November 2008	CD
