= Violet Hill =

2008 single by Coldplay

Single by Coldplay

from the album Viva la Vida or Death and All His Friends
- B-side: "A Spell a Rebel Yell"; "Lost?"
- Released: 6 May 2008
- Recorded: 2007
- Genre: Alternative rock; blues rock; hard rock
- Length: 3:42 (album version); 3:50 (single version); 3:20 (radio edit)
- Label: Parlophone; Capitol
- Songwriters: Guy Berryman; Jonny Buckland; Will Champion; Chris Martin
- Producers: Markus Dravs; Brian Eno; Jon Hopkins; Rik Simpson

Coldplay singles chronology
"The Hardest Part" (2006)	"Violet Hill" (2008)	"Viva la Vida" (2008)

Music videos
- "Violet Hill" on YouTube; "Violet Hill" (Dancing Politicians version) on YouTube

"Violet Hill" is a song by British rock band Coldplay. It was written by all members of the band for their fourth album, Viva la Vida or Death and All His Friends (2008). Built around a repeating guitar sound, it utilises a marching tempo, supported by the pianos and rhythms that accompany the song's lyrics. The song was initially made available as a free download on the band's website and was downloaded more than two million times.

Coldplay vocalist Chris Martin revealed that the song had been in development for a number of years, with the first line and the first little melody of the song written, prior to its completion in 2007. "Violet Hill" is the first anti-war protest song from the group. The single was received with positive reviews. The track was released worldwide as the lead single from Viva la Vida or Death and All His Friends, reaching number nine on the Billboard Hot Modern Rock Tracks chart and number eight on the UK Singles Chart.

It was featured as a downloadable song for the 2007 music video game Guitar Hero III: Legends of Rock, as well as being featured in Guitar Hero On Tour: Modern Hits and the documentary Warren Miller's Children of Winter. The song was nominated at the Q awards in the category for Best Track and received two Grammy Award nominations for Best Rock Song and Best Rock Performance by a Duo or Group. The music video for "Violet Hill" was nominated for Best Special Effects at the 2008 MTV Video Music Awards. The single has been widely sampled, with different covers and sounds.

== Background and writing ==
Coldplay vocalist Chris Martin stated that the band wrote the first line and the first little melody of the song around the first half of the 2000s but did not finish it until 2007. Martin told Rolling Stone magazine that lyrics from the song about "a carnival of idiots on show" and how a "fox became God" were a commentary on Fox News. "One day I was watching Bill O'Reilly, and I was like, 'I know how to finish that song. My best friend, Tim ... was having trouble with his boss, and it made me think that so many people spend their lives being told what to do by people that they just don't like. So it was that idea, and watching Bill O'Reilly, and all these words just came out."

During an interview with MTV News, bassist Guy Berryman revealed that the song was one of the older songs that the band had been working on and that they had to move it to one side from the list of songs that were going to appear in the album. Phil Harvey, the band's manager, urged them to include the track in the album, which led to the band to drag it back to the shortlist. The first verse of the song was taken from an unreleased song named "December", written by frontman Chris Martin and guitarist Jonny Buckland in 1997. An early instrumental of the song from the Viva la Vida sessions was leaked into the internet in 2009, it contained an excerpt from a previously performed song named "Solid Ground (Until the Water Flows Over)" as the intro, but it was scratched and the song remained unreleased.

The song is the first anti-war protest song from the band. "Violet Hill" derives its title from a street of the same name near Abbey Road.

== Composition ==
"Violet Hill" excerpt
The music of "Violet Hill" is built around a jagged guitar riff.

"Violet Hill" features an atmospheric synthesizer intro, which gives way to a piano melody played by Martin. The rest of the band then joins in and the song's prominent guitar riff, characterized by a jagged, fuzzbox distortion effect, enters. Martin sings about medieval imagery of carnivals, cathedrals, religion and war, culminating in a soaring chorus with an anthemic theme. The momentum of the song builds around guitarist Jonny Buckland, who plays a solo. Writing for Diffuser Martin Keilty described the song as a "grimy blues-rock march".

The lyrics start off with Martin recalling: "Was a long and dark December/From the rooftops I remember/There was snow". Martin emphasizes towards the thoughts of a soldier going into battle. The line "If you love me, why'd you let me go?", talks about a man's love of a woman, who does not reciprocate his love. The song ends with Martin playing the piano and singing, and pleading in nearly spoken-words: "If you love me, won't you let me know?" In live performances of the song, he plays the piano part on his acoustic guitar.

According to Neil McCormick of The Sydney Morning Herald, he writes that the lyrics "I don't want to be a soldier", is a way that Martin can conjure John Lennon into the song's melody. McCormick, however, notes that Martin "adds his own poetic twist" to the lyric "Who the captain of some sinking ship would stow, far below/So if you love me, why'd you let me go?".

Musically, it is one of Coldplay's more diverse pieces, featuring many different time signatures. While the majority of the song is in common time, or 4/4, the interlude of "if you love me, won't you let me know?" is in 6/4, preceding two bars of 4/4 before going back into the verses. The outro, consisting of Chris Martin's vocal accompanied by a piano switches from 4/4, 3/4, 5/4 and 6/4.

== Release ==
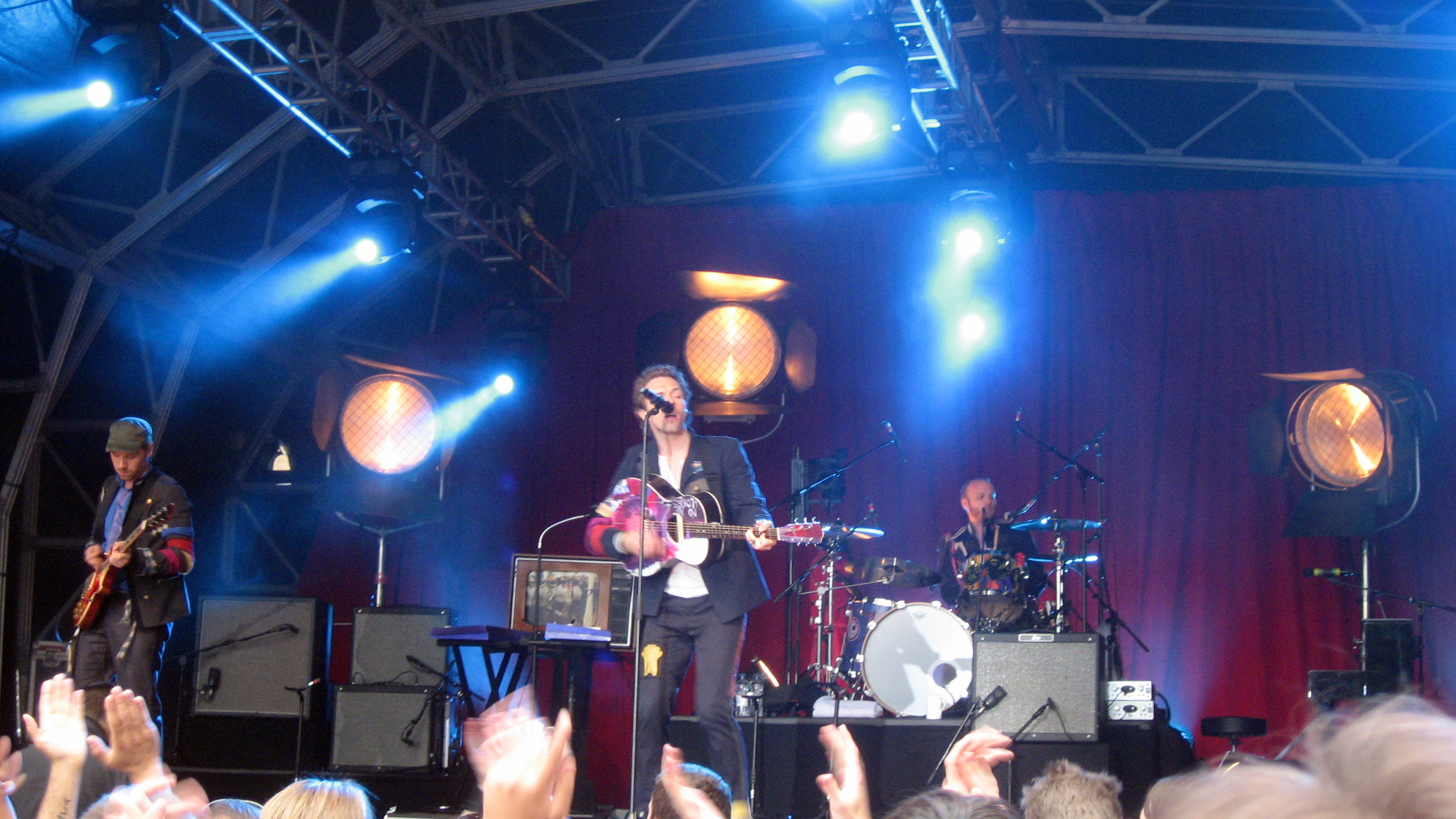
Coldplay performing "Violet Hill" outside BBC Television Centre during their Viva la Vida Tour in 2008

"Violet Hill" was originally made available as a free download through Coldplay's official website on 29 April 2008. BBC Radio 1 aired it for the first time on the same day. Additionally, the band declared that the song would have a proper commercial release on 6 May. In the United States, however, it got sent to radio stations a day before. "Violet Hill" was downloaded by over 600,000 users worldwide during its first 24 hours. By the following week, numbers had already surpassed 2 million.

Coldplay released "Violet Hill" in the US on 9 May 2008 as the album's first single. A promotional 7" vinyl release of the single was given away free in the 10 May issue of NME, including non-album track "A Spell a Rebel Yell" on the B-side. On subsequent physical releases, "Lost?", an acoustic version of "Lost!", serves as a B-side instead.

The single debuted on the US Billboard Hot 100 on 24 May 2008 at number 40. The song stayed in the peak position from its release. Three weeks after its release, the track entered at the number nine position on Hot Modern Rock Tracks. The song peaked at number six in Canada Singles Chart and number eight in the UK Singles Chart, making it the second single to reach the Top 10 to have not having a single released physically. "Violet Hill" was certified Platinum by Associação Brasileira dos Produtores de Discos (ABPD).

== Critical reception ==
"Violet Hill" was met with acclaim from music critics. In the Los Angeles Times review of the album, critic Todd Martens wrote: "The song's first guitar crush arrives after a lengthy ambient intro, and brings an electrifying jolt to the striking piano melody. Martin brings a booming confidence to his vocals that has been more evident in Coldplay's live shows than on record." Simon Vozick-Levinson from Entertainment Weekly wrote: "'Violet Hill' opens with a thin synth wash that's very Music for Airports, and proceeds from there to some droning, stabbing guitar textures that sound cooler than most any Coldplay tunes I can think of." Kristina Feliciano of Paste magazine wrote: "You know you're in for a different kind of Coldplay experience when Chris Martin ditches his anguished falsetto for a deep, doomy basso profundo, as he does on 'Violet Hill'". Mikael Wood of Spin magazine wrote: "'Violet Hill' pulls a similar fake-out, bludgeoning a delicate Eno-style soundscape with big Black Sabbath guitars." Darcie Stevens of the Austin Chronicle wrote: "While the band's fourth LP begins light and pretty, its power breaks late-album with Old West tangent 'Violet Hill'". The song appeared on Rolling Stone's Hot List for May 2009, with the magazine calling it "a (relatively) hard-rocking attack on Fox News' America".

After the song's release, "Violet Hill" was featured in the music video games Guitar Hero III: Legends of Rock, as downloadable content, and in Guitar Hero On Tour: Modern Hits. The single was covered by Pendulum during BBC Radio 1's Live Lounge. It has been mixed by Michael Brauer, who also mixed Coldplay's debut album, Parachutes. It was also featured on an episode of the UK soap opera Hollyoaks.

The official video for "Violet Hill" was nominated for Best UK Video and Best Special Effects at the 2008 MTV Video Music Awards. The track was also nominated for two Q Awards in Best Track and Best Video. The song was nominated for two Grammy Awards in the categories of Best Rock Song and Best Rock Performance by a Duo or Group. In 2010, "Violet Hill" was among the works featured on The Xfm Top 1000 Songs of All Time book.

== Music videos ==
Screenshot from the Asa Mader video

A music video was filmed in support of the song, which was released 18 May. It was directed by visual artist Asa Mader, and parts were shot at Mount Etna and in the courtyard of Palazzo Biscari, Catania, Sicily.

This original version of the video begins with the band climbing a hill and reaching a quiet town, where they start playing their instruments. The four musicians are shown performing the song, dancing and walking around on Mount Etna's hills. Scenes are sometimes sped up or in slow motion and alternated with black and white close-ups of band members' faces. Chris Martin is seen singing holding a magnifying glass in front of his mouth, hitting the screen with a hammer and walking on the snow. At the end of the video, Martin falls to the snow and the band walks away from the town. This video was shown on a small on-stage television screen as part of the live shows, during the band's 2008 Viva la Vida tour.

An alternative music video, named 'Dancing Politicians', was posted on Coldplay's official website on 20 May, directed by Mat Whitecross. The video is made up of clips, sometimes looped, featuring various politicians and scenes of war, along with clips of the band in Mader's version of the video, as well as firework displays at the end. It prominently features George W. Bush, presenting clips of him in a mocking manner. Prominent personalities, such as Fidel Castro, Richard Nixon, Hugo Chávez, Robert Mugabe, Osama bin Laden, Saddam Hussein, Boris Yeltsin, Barack Obama, Bill and Hillary Clinton, Tony and Cherie Blair, and Elizabeth II and Prince Philip are featured in this alternate video. In 2008, Chris Martin has stated that it is their "favorite video they ever made".

An unreleased third music video was released for Apple Music in 2019. This version shows the band recording the song in the studio.

== Track listing ==
Digital download
No.	Title	Length
1.	"Violet Hill"	3:50

CD Single
No.	Title	Length
1.	"Violet Hill"	3:50
2.	"Lost?"	3:42

Promotional CD Single
No.	Title	Length
1.	"Violet Hill" (radio edit)	3:21

Promotional 7" (free with NME)
No.	Title	Length
1.	"Violet Hill"	3:50
2.	"A Spell a Rebel Yell"	2:48

== Personnel ==
- Chris Martin – composer, performer
- Guy Berryman – composer, performer
- Jonny Buckland – composer, performer
- Will Champion – composer, performer

== Charts ==
=== Weekly charts ===
Weekly chart performance
Chart (2008)	Peak position
Australia (ARIA)	9
Austria (Ö3 Austria Top 40)	11
Belgium (Ultratop 50 Flanders)	10
Belgium (Ultratop 50 Wallonia)	7
Canada Hot 100 (Billboard)	6
Canada CHR/Top 40 (Billboard)	42
Canada Hot AC (Billboard)	29
Canada Rock (Billboard)	3
CIS Airplay (TopHit)	156
Czech Republic Airplay (ČNS IFPI)	14
Denmark (Tracklisten)	11
European Hot 100 Singles (Billboard)	9
France (SNEP)	36
Germany (GfK)	10
Iceland (Tónlistinn)	1
Ireland (IRMA)	13
Italy (FIMI)	9
Netherlands (Dutch Top 40)	9
Netherlands (Single Top 100)	13
New Zealand (Recorded Music NZ)	5
Norway (VG-lista)	8
Slovakia Airplay (ČNS IFPI)	21
Sweden (Sverigetopplistan)	8
Switzerland (Schweizer Hitparade)	11
UK Singles (Official Charts)	8
US Billboard Hot 100	40
US Adult Alternative Airplay (Billboard)	1
US Alternative Airplay (Billboard)	9
US Pop 100 (Billboard)	38
Venezuela Pop Rock (Record Report)	1

=== Year-end charts ===
Year-end chart performance
Chart (2008)	Position
Australia (ARIA)	68
Austria (Ö3 Austria Top 40)	75
Belgium (Ultratop 50 Flanders)	93
Belgium (Ultratop 50 Wallonia)	89
Canada (Canadian Hot 100)	60
European Hot 100 Singles (Billboard)	75
Germany (Media Control GfK)	80
Netherlands (Dutch Top 40)	65
Switzerland (Schweizer Hitparade)	62
UK Singles (OCC)	79

== Certifications and sales ==
Certifications and sales
Region	Certification	Certified units/sales
Australia (ARIA)	Gold	35,000^{^}
Brazil (Pro-Música Brasil)	Platinum	60,000^{*}
France	—	22,510 (Note: French decade-end sales for "Violet Hill" in the 2000s.)
New Zealand (RMNZ)	Gold	7,500^{*}
United Kingdom (BPI)	Gold	400,000^{‡}
^{*} Sales figures based on certification alone.^{^} Shipments figures based on certification alone.^{‡} Sales+streaming figures based on certification alone.

== See also ==
- List of anti-war songs
- List of top 10 singles for 2008 in Australia
- List of UK top-ten singles in 2008
- List of Billboard number-one adult alternative singles of the 2000s
