= Lovers in Japan =

2008 single by Coldplay

Promotional single by Coldplay

from the album Viva la Vida or Death and All His Friends
- Released: 3 November 2008
- Genre: Alternative rock
- Length: 3:57; 6:51 (with "Reign of Love")
- Label: Parlophone; Capitol
- Songwriters: Guy Berryman; Jonny Buckland; Will Champion; Chris Martin
- Producers: Markus Dravs; Brian Eno; Rik Simpson

Music video
- "Lovers in Japan" on YouTube

"Lovers in Japan" is a song by British rock band Coldplay. It was written by all members of the band for their fourth studio album, Viva la Vida or Death and All His Friends (2008). The song is built around an introductory tack piano sound, then followed by chiming guitars and soaring choruses, supported by the pianos and rhythms that accompany the song's lyrics. The album version of "Lovers in Japan" shares the track with the song "Reign of Love".

It was released as a promotional single on 3 November 2008 and peaked at number 10 on the Billboard Bubbling Under Hot 100 Singles chart. The song also charted at number 19 on Billboard's Adult Top 40 chart. "Lovers in Japan" was well received by music critics, who praised the track's general sound. Although the track is seen as Viva's overall third single, the version sent to radios and used in the music video is the Osaka Sun Mix, which is featured on the Prospekt's March EP.

== Writing and composition ==
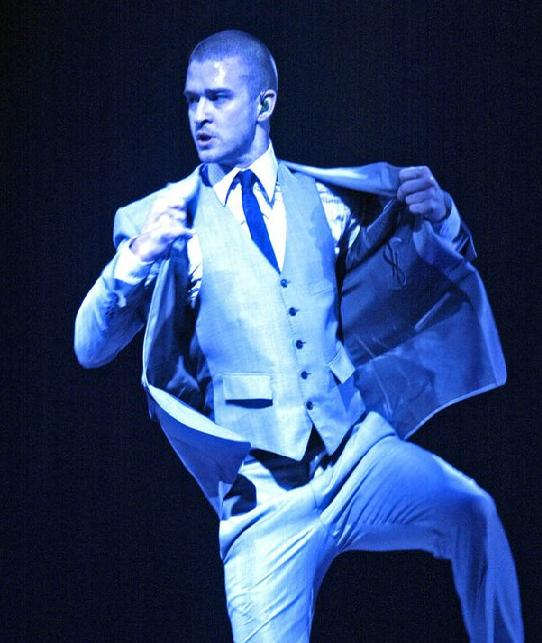
Justin Timberlake inspired the "two-in-one" song title that "Lovers in Japan/Reign of Love" has.

When asked about the development of the song, during a track-by-track reveal, drummer Will Champion said:

We were in a studio in New York, this place called the Magic Shop, and it had this thing called a tack piano there, which sounds like an old honky-tonk piano, where you put little tacks in the hammers, so it sounds like more of a harpsichord almost. And so we wanted to use that kind of sound, but we didn't have a tack piano, so rather than sample it, we went and bought an old piano from the shop up the road from our studio, and we bought a load of tacks, and me and Guy and Jon spent a couple of hours pushing tacks into the piano hammers.

On Viva la Vida or Death and All His Friends, "Lovers in Japan" transitions seamlessly into a second track entitled "Reign of Love". In an interview with Q magazine, bassist Guy Berryman explained that the band could not make up their minds about the track listing, as they had discussed that they wanted to keep the album concise with a total of ten tracks and an intended length of under 42 minutes. Champion further stated, "We just preferred to have less titles and more stuff. The album as a whole has got the most on it, but it’s the shortest. We wanted to make it almost impossible for you to not listen to it all in one go."

The song's instrumentation features an introductory detuned tack piano sound, progressing to feature upbeat guitar riffs and soaring choruses. Towards the end, it builds into a rhythmically soaring sound, compared by critics to that of Irish rock band U2. Martin sings about the shortness of time, as well as "runners who must run until the race is won" and "soldiers who must soldier on" in the second and third verses of the song.

== Release and reception ==
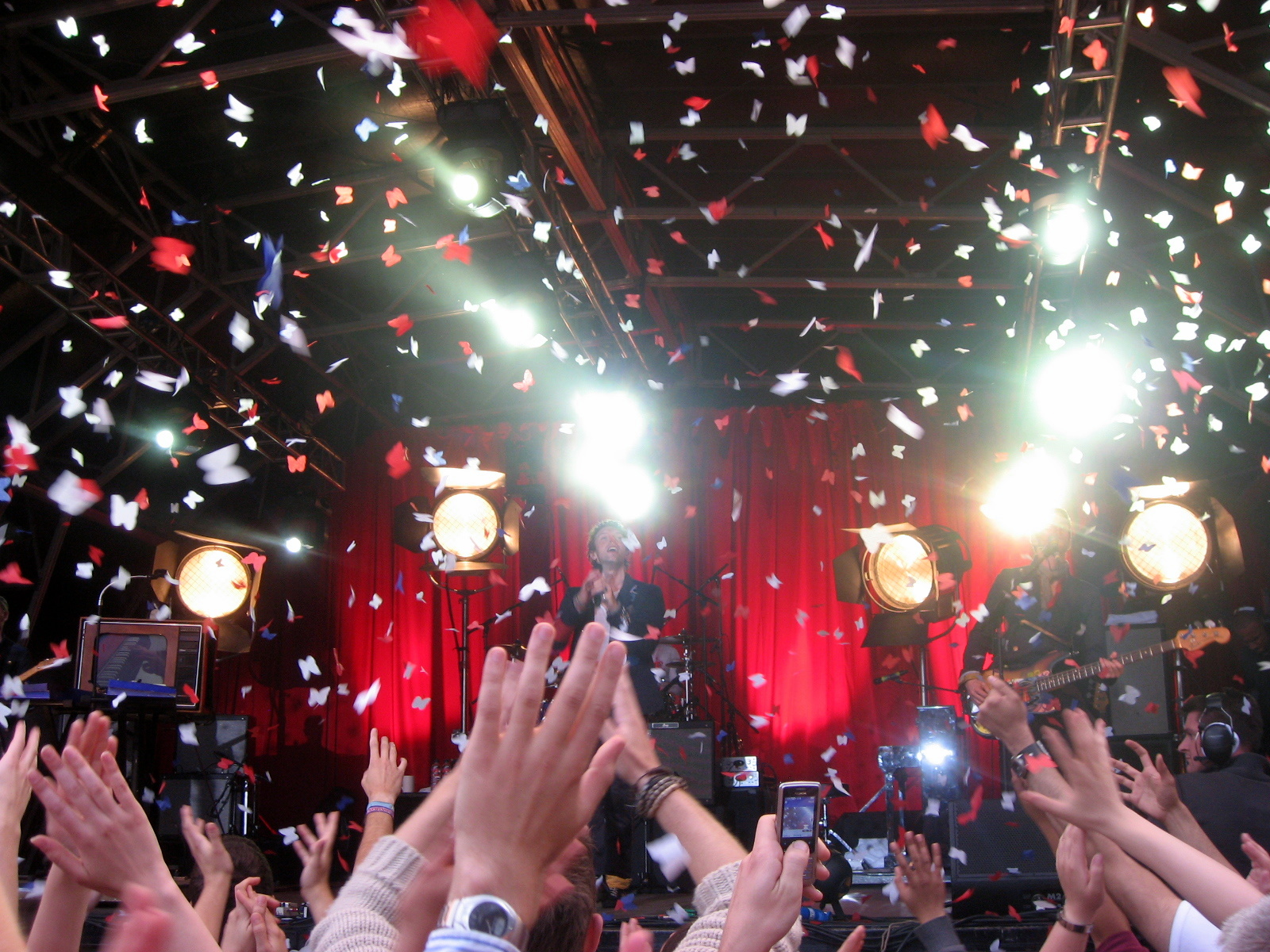
Coldplay performing "Lovers in Japan" outside the BBC Television Centre during their Viva la Vida Tour in 2008.

Coldplay released "Lovers in Japan" in the United States on 3 November 2008 as a promotional single from Viva la Vida or Death and All His Friends. A new mix of the song is also featured in the band's 2008 EP Prospekt's March, entitled "Lovers in Japan (Osaka Sun Mix)". Chris Martin said of the Prospekt's March version of the song: "We've been playing it live better than it is on the record. So the live version has informed this Osaka Sun version, which is just a bit more lively." "Lovers in Japan" was released as a promotional radio single in the United States and entered Billboard's Hot Adult Top 40 Tracks chart, where it peaked at number 32 on the issue dated 29 November 2008. The track also peaked at number 10 on the Billboard Bubbling Under Hot 100 Singles chart and at number 65 on the Pop 100 chart. Outside of the United States, "Lovers in Japan" peaked at number 41 on the Japan Hot 100.

"Lovers in Japan" received high commendations from critics. Alexis Petridis of The Guardian review of the album, wrote: "Chris Martin's melodies ... shine: even his loudest detractor could hardly deny his way with a tune as evidenced here by '42' and 'Lovers in Japan'." Evan Sawdey of PopMatters remarked that the song is "stunning, jaw-dropping highlight". He added that "Martin pounds away at a bouncy toy-piano melody ... leading into a chorus where guitarist Jonny Buckland gets to unleash what might be the catchiest guitar riff he's written... (and yes, he absolutely bathes in the moment)." Joey Guerra of the Houston Chronicle described "Lovers in Japan" as a "joyous, romantic anthem that combines wistful rock riffs and gorgeous piano". He also wrote that the song is one of "the disc's best moments".

Jed Gottlieb of the Boston Herald remarked that the piano sound in "Lovers in Japan/Reign of Love" hints at the 1968 song "Lady Madonna" by The Beatles, "before taking a neo-classical, Chopin-does-Britpop route". Jeff Crawford of the City Messenger wrote, "'Lovers in Japan/Reign of Love' and 'Strawberry Swing' rank among the band's best work". In December 2008, Consequence had the song at number 11 on their list of best tracks of the year. NPO Radio 2 ranked it at 434th place on the annual Top 2000. Coldplay later performed "Lovers in Japan" on BBC Radio 1 on 27 November 2019, while promoting their eighth album Everyday Life.

== Music video ==
Frontman Chris Martin light painting the word "Lovers" in the music video.

A music video for the single, directed by Mat Whitecross in London, was released on 31 October 2008 through the iTunes Store. The video was made available for free for a week on the American and Canadian iTunes Stores. The video utilises the "Osaka Sun Mix" version of the song.

The first half of the video shows the band playing in a courtyard while each member writes certain words from the lyrics in glowing neon on the screen. During the chorus, the camera spins around in circles to go along with the lines "They are turning my head out". The video ends with butterfly-shaped confetti raining on the band, as happens when each chorus is played at live concerts, along with the words "The End" on the screen behind the band as they take a bow.

== Personnel ==
- Chris Martin – composer, performer
- Guy Berryman – composer, performer
- Jonny Buckland – composer, performer
- Will Champion – composer, performer

== Charts ==
=== Weekly charts ===
Weekly chart performance
Chart (2008–2009)	Peak position
Belgium (Ultratop 50 Wallonia)	40
Canada Hot 100 (Billboard)	77
Iceland (RÚV)	5
Japan Hot 100 (Billboard)	41
Mexico Ingles Airplay	2
Netherlands (Dutch Top 40)	12
US Bubbling Under Hot 100 (Billboard)	10
US Adult Alternative Airplay (Billboard)	3
US Adult Pop Airplay (Billboard)	19
US Pop 100 (Billboard)	65

=== Year-end charts ===
Year-end chart performance
Chart (2009)	Position
Netherlands (Dutch Top 40)	56

== Release history ==
Release dates and formats
Region	Date	Format	Label	Ref.
United States	3 November 2008	Contemporary hit radio	Capitol	
United States	3 November 2008	Hot adult contemporary radio	Capitol	
United States	5 January 2009	Adult album alternative radio	Capitol	
