= Davide Rossi =

Italian musician (born 1970)

- Born: 7 August 1970 (age 55); Turin, Italy
- Genres: Alternative rock, classical, pop
- Occupations: Violinist, string arranger, composer, conductor, record producer
- Instruments: Violin, viola, cello, contrabass, electric violin, guitar, keyboards, vocals
- Years active: 1985–present

Davide Rossi (born 7 August 1970) is an Italian violinist, string arranger, orchestrator, songwriter, composer and conductor, perhaps best known for having been the electric violinist and multi-instrumentalist for the British electronic music duo Goldfrapp from 2000 until 2013, and for his large contribution of electric violin parts and for most of the string arrangements on all Coldplay's albums since Viva la Vida or Death and All His Friends (2008).

== Biography ==
=== Early career – Italy ===
Rossi began playing music at the age of four and, encouraged by his mother, started to study violin at the age of ten. He entered the Conservatory Giuseppe Verdi of Turin in 1981 and began studying under the guidance of Maestro Ivan Krivensky, who remained his violin teacher until his passing in 2019. Rossi received his Diploma in 1992 at the homonymous school in Milan.

Alongside formal classical studies he started to work with bands at the age of fifteen, mainly in the Turin area. After his Diploma in 1992 he joined Mau Mau full-time; a folk-rock band from Turin with whom he recorded many albums and toured most of Europe and the Middle-East. Other Italian bands that featured his work are Casino Royale, Afterhours, La Crus, Cristina Donà, Bluvertigo and the singer songwriter Vinicio Capossela.

=== Robert Fripp – Guitar Craft ===
In 1990 Rossi became a student of legendary guitarist Robert Fripp and followed intensively his Guitar Craft courses all over the world for a period of nearly four years. In 1995 he moved to the UK and began a period of study where he completed a BA in Composition at Bath Spa University College and a MSC in Digital Music Technology at Keele University. In 1999 he attended a music course by German composer Karlheinz Stockhausen in Kürten, near Cologne, Germany. This two week period, coupled with Guitar Craft, was highly influential on Rossi's future musical career.

=== Goldfrapp ===
In 2000 Rossi was invited by musician Will Gregory, whom he had met two years previously, to join his new band Goldfrapp. Since then Rossi has been part of all the live incarnations of the band, touring most of the world during the Felt Mountain Tour (2000–2002), Black Cherry Tour (2003–2004), Supernature Tour (2005–2006), Seventh Tree Tour (2008) and Head First Tour (2010). Although before Head First he has never played on any Goldfrapp's studio albums, he has recorded several b-sides, acoustic and live recordings of the band and a live DVD. In September 2013 Rossi announced that the performance at the Beacon Theatre in New York City was going to be his last with the band, in order to pursue his own arranging and composing career and the increasing commitment with his own band Black Submarine.

=== Coldplay ===
From the autumn of 2006 until February 2008, Rossi's career focussed mainly on studio work and string arranging. At the time of writing this is once again his focus. He uses his acoustic violins, violas, cellos and contrabass to re-create a whole orchestra. His work is featured in six songs of the Coldplay album Viva la Vida or Death and All His Friends, produced by Brian Eno, Markus Dravs and Rik Simpson. "Violet Hill", first single released by the band on iTunes, features a soundscapes intro-like, which originally was an improvisation that Rossi and keyboard player Jon Hopkins did together during an early session with the band at their studio in London. Others songs where Rossi's electric violin can be heard are: Life In Technicolor, 42, Yes and Strawberry Swing (the chunky bass groove, didgeridoo's like that comes a little while after the beginning of the song, is one of the many examples of the sound of his Violectra). In Yes, the electric violin takes shape as a John Cale-ish riff almost monotonically throughout the verses, while full and sometimes Arabic string arrangements are heavily featured at the beginning and during the song's breaks. "Viva La Vida" however, is the tune where Rossi's work is featured in its fullest. His strings are the driving force throughout the whole song: with an unforgettable opening loop supporting Martin's voice, that builds in the choruses where the symphonic power of the orchestra is in full effect.

In November 2008, Coldplay released an EP titled Prospekt's March, in which Rossi contributes to the songs: Life in Technicolor II, Rainy Day and Prospekt's March/Poppyfields.

December 2010 saw Rossi back in the studio with Coldplay, to start on a yet very long session for the album Mylo Xyloto, which was released in October 2011. His string arrangements are presents on 10 tracks of the album: Paradise, Charlie Brown, Us Against the World, U.F.O., Every Teardrop is a Waterfall, Up in Flames, A Hopeful Transmission, Princess of China, Don't Let It Break Your Heart and Up with the Birds.

In July 2011, Coldplay released the Every Teardrop Is a Waterfall EP where Rossi is present in the title song and on a B side called Moving To Mars.

Although Coldplay has an unspoken rule of not allowing any extra musician on stage besides the 4 members of the band, Rossi's strings feature live heavily by means of backing tape. Coldplay half-broke that rule allowing Rossi to perform 'in shadow' and just behind them on the song A Message 2010, at the Hope For Haiti benefit concert, which took place in the UK and US as a TV marathon gig. The song was later released on iTunes. Rossi did also some occasional appearances with Chris Martin during some charity events; in November 2006, for the Mencap Charity Concert at the Union Chapel in London and in October 2009 at the Bridge School Benefit in San Francisco, where Rossi performed also with Neil Young the song Comes a Time.

=== The Verve ===
During the early part of 2008, Rossi met The Verve's guitarist Nick McCabe who invited him to play on a session for what would become the album Forth, later released in the August of the same year. Rossi' s contribution to this album can be heard in six tracks. In Love Is Noise, he contributes, with the lower strings of his electric violin, to the daunting sound of the famous loop upon which the whole song is then developed. Sit And Wonder is a ground-breaking collaboration of 'noises' with Nick McCabe, where guitar and electric violin play a dance of interweaving acid sounds and harmonies. More classic string arrangements can be heard on songs like Valium Skies, Judas, I See Houses and Rather Be. Rossi has also performed with the Verve during several live and TV shows of their latest summer campaign. Some of them include Glastonbury and the V Festival.

=== Röyksopp ===
March 2009 sees the release of another important collaboration for Rossi. Norwegian band Röyksopp features his string arrangements in four of the eleven track of their new album Junior. These are: The Girl and the Robot, Röyksopp Forever, You Don't Have a Clue and Silver Cruiser.

From the same session Röyksopp released in 2010 Senior, in which Rossi is featured on the song "Senior Living".

Rossi has also appeared live with the band on various concerts around Europe and the UK in 2009.

=== Arranger, Orchestrator ===
Rossi's work as arranger and producer has been featured on records of artists such as Siouxsie, Dido, Jon Hopkins, The Proclaimers, Chris Martin, Eros Ramazzotti, Alicia Keys, Moby, Jazmine Sullivan, Trentemøller, Zucchero, Rihanna, Duran Duran, Jack Savoretti, Depeche Mode, Lucio Corsi and many others.

== Discography ==
Year	Albums/Singles/EPs	Artist
1991	People Pie	Africa Unite
1992	Soma La Macia	Mau Mau
1992	Sauta Rabel	Mau Mau
1993	Tuira	Mau Mau
1994	Bàss Paradis	Mau Mau
1994	Gridalo Forte	Fratelli Di Soledad
1994	Salviamo Il Salvabile	Fratelli Di Soledad
1995	Germi	Afterhours
1995	Gibous, Bagase e Bandì	Lou Dalfin
1996	Viva Mamanera	Mau Mau
1996	1996 Adesso!	Casino Royale
1997	Rosemary Plexiglas	Scisma
1998	Eldorado	Mau Mau
1999	Zero – ovvero la famosa nevicata dell'85	Bluvertigo
1999	Armstrong	Scisma
2000	Safari Beach	Mau Mau
2000	Felt Mountain	Goldfrapp
2001	Pilots	Goldfrapp
2001	Utopia	Goldfrapp
2002	Kodachrome – Compositions for Orchestra by Raymond Scott	The Metropole Orchestra, Jan Stulen conductor
2003	Ogni cosa che vedo	La Crus
2003	Preghiere	Vero
2003	Twist	Goldfrapp
2003	Strict Machine	Goldfrapp
2004	Fox & Feldman Clarinet quintets	Roger Heaton, Mieko Kanno, Bridget Carey and Sophie Harris
2004	Wonderful Electric: Live In London	Goldfrapp
2004	Black Cherry	Goldfrapp
2005	Sex And Flags	Stackridge
2005	Number 1	Goldfrapp
2005	Live Here Now	Goldfrapp
2005	Parola D' Onore	Roy Paci
2006	Bingo	Bela B
2006	Dea	Mau Mau
2006	Cake or Death	Lee Hazlewood
2006	Yndigt Land	Sterling
2006	Ride A White Horse	Goldfrapp
2006	Satin Boys, Flaming Chic	Goldfrapp
2007	Mantaray	Siouxie Sioux
2007	Mondovisione	Righeira
2007	Life with You	The Proclaimers
2007	Dea	Mau Mau
2007	And He Just Pointed To The Sky...	Peder
2007	The Rainbow Express	Ja Confetti
2007	New Religion/In Recognition	The Proclaimers
2007	Købmanden	Blæs Bukki Feat. Natasja, Ormen, Jonatan Spang, Laura Bro
2007	Your Song	George G.
2008	Un'altra Me	Syria
2008	Io non credevo che questa sera	La Crus
2008	Viva la Vida or Death and All His Friends	Coldplay
2008	Echoes	California Guitar Trio
2008	Forth	The Verve
2008	Prospekt's March	Coldplay
2008	Seventh Tree	Goldfrapp
2008	Couple Therapy	Trolle/Siebenhaar
2008	Biblen	Rune Klan/Blæs Bukki/Tue Track/Linda P./Jonatan Spang
2008	Love Is Noise	The Verve
2008	Rather Be	The Verve
2008	Caravan Girl	Goldfrapp
2008	Audition Day	Oh Land
2008	Fauna	Oh Land
2009	Junior	Röyksopp
2009	Notes And Rhythm	The Proclaimers
2009	Limited Edition Tour Pack	Coldplay
2009	Insides	Jon Hopkins
2009	Ali e radici	Eros Ramazzotti
2009	.23	Alex Britti
2009	Come To Life	Natalia Imbruglia
2009	Jagten Paa Noget	Balstyrko
2009	The Girl And The Robot	Röyksopp
2009	The Element Of Freedom	Alicia Keys
2009	Let Me Be/Take Heart In Your Hope	Dan Arborise
2009	Ta' Tøjet Af	Ormen & Alberte
2010	Music from the Film 'Monsters'	Jon Hopkins
2010	Senior	Röyksopp
2010	Love Me Back	Jazmine Sullivan
2010	Ministry Of Sound: Chilled Acoustic	Röyksopp
2010	Silk Wilhelm I: Audiovisual Culture, Vol. I	Kowesix
2010	Head First	Goldfrapp
2010	Standing On Top Of Utopia	Kasper Bjørke
2010	Selected	Recoil
2010	Chocabeck	Zucchero
2010	Believer	Goldfrapp
2010	Heaven	Kasper Bjørke
2010	Into The Great Wide Yonder	Trentemøller
2010	Live	Goldfrapp
2010	Ruins' Hotel	Hana-b
2010	Enrico Nigiotti	Enrico Nigiotti
2010	Ivy	Elisa
2011	Every Teardrop Is a Waterfall EP	Coldplay
2011	Mylo Xyloto	Coldplay
2011	The Kurofune EP	The Black Ships
2011	Johnny Boy Would Love This: A Tribute To John Martyn	The Black Ships
2011	You And I	The Pierces
2011	Dietro Le Apparenze	Giorgia
2011	The Skin I Live In	Alberto Iglesias
2012	Girl On Fire	Alicia Keys
2012	Steppin' On Water	Elisa
2012	The Singles	Goldfrapp
2012	Fault Lines	Turboweekend
2012	Princess of China	Coldplay & Rihanna
2012	Spirit Of Talk Talk	Various Artists
2012	Suite For Violin And Piano	DavideRossi/Arnold Eldus
2013	L'Anima Vola	Elisa
2013	LNOE	The High Wire
2013	Love Form	Charlie Jones
2013	Girl Who Got Away	Dido
2013	Din For Evigt	Burhan G
2013	Live In Copenhagen	Trentemøller
2013	Greatest Hits	Dido
2013	Nocturnal	Yuna
2013	Maledetto Colui Che È Solo	Mauro Ermanno Giovanardi
2013	Segovia	Fever Hut
2013	The Hunger Games: Catching Fire [Original Motion Picture Soundtrack]	Coldplay
2013	The Very Best Of: 25 Years 1987-2012	The Proclaimers
2018	Wildness	Snow Patrol
2019	Singing to Strangers	Jack Savoretti
2019	Everyday Life	Coldplay
2020	Song Machine Episode 2	Gorillaz
2020	Sangre de Cristo	Vian Izak
2022	Holy Fvck ("4 Ever 4 Me")	Demi Lovato
2025	Volevo essere un duro	Lucio Corsi

== Awards ==
=== Grammy Awards ===
2009	"Viva la Vida"	Record of the Year	Nominated
2009	"Viva la Vida"	Song of the Year	Won
2009	"Viva la Vida"	Best Pop Vocal Performance by a Duo or Group	Won
2009	Viva la Vida or Death and All His Friends	Album of the Year	Nominated
2009	Viva la Vida or Death and All His Friends	Best Rock Album	Won
2009	"Violet Hill"	Best Rock Song	Nominated
2009	"Violet Hill"	Best Rock Vocal Performance by a Duo or Group	Nominated
