= Viva la Vida or Death and All His Friends =

- Standard edition cover

Studio album by Coldplay
- Released: 12 June 2008
- Recorded: November 2006 – April 2008
- Studios: The Bakery (London); Magic Shop (New York City); The Nunnery (Barcelona); A Church (Barcelona)
- Genres: Alternative rock; art rock; pop rock; indie pop; art pop
- Length: 45:51
- Labels: Parlophone; Capitol
- Producers: Brian Eno; Markus Dravs; Jon Hopkins; Rik Simpson

Coldplay chronology
The Singles 1999–2006 (2007)	Viva la Vida or Death and All His Friends (2008)	Prospekt's March (2008)

Singles from Viva la Vida or Death and All His Friends
- 1. "Violet Hill" Released: 6 May 2008; 2. "Viva la Vida" Released: 25 May 2008; 3. "Lost!" Released: 10 November 2008; 4. "Strawberry Swing" Released: 14 September 2009

Viva la Vida or Death and All His Friends is the fourth studio album by the British rock band Coldplay, released on 12 June 2008 by Parlophone in the United Kingdom. "Viva la vida" is a Spanish phrase, translated to English as "long live life" or simply "live life". Lyrically, the album contains references to love, life, death and war.

Recording sessions for the album took place from November 2006 to April 2008 and featured production by Jon Hopkins, Rik Simpson, Markus Dravs, and Brian Eno. The album was Coldplay's first not to feature any production input from Ken Nelson, who produced their first two albums and co-produced some tracks on their third. The band forced themselves to explore new styles, as Eno required every song on the album to sound different. Development of the album delayed the release date several times. The album cover of Viva la Vida is the 1830 painting Liberty Leading the People by Eugène Delacroix with the album title over it.

Viva la Vida was both a critical and commercial success. Five songs were released to promote the album: "Violet Hill" and "Viva la Vida" in May 2008, "Lovers in Japan" and "Lost!" in November 2008, and "Strawberry Swing" in September 2009. "Viva la Vida" became the band's first song to reach number one in both the United States and the United Kingdom. It won Best Rock Album at the 2009 Grammy Awards and was also nominated for Album of the Year. Viva la Vida also reached number one in 36 countries upon release, with EMI shipping over 3 million copies in its first week worldwide. It was the best-selling album of 2008. By 2011, the album had sold 13 million copies worldwide, making it one of the best-selling releases of the 21st century. Viva la Vida was re-released on 25 November 2008 in a deluxe edition containing the original album and the Prospekt's March EP, which contained "Life in Technicolor II".

== Background ==
Coldplay's previous album, X&Y (2005), received mixed reviews. The singer, Chris Martin, was particularly affected by a negative review in the New York Times. He said: "It was a big deal. It's the first real attack on your band, and from a publication we all respect. I agreed with a lot of the points. It was like, 'Yeah, I do sometimes go for the obvious, and I do sometimes fall back on old tricks.' So, in a way, it was liberating to see that someone else realised that also."

The musician and producer Brian Eno had contributed keyboards to X&Y. Eno told them that they "work far too long but not hard enough". When Coldplay asked Eno to suggest a producer who could help them improve for their next album, he suggested himself. Martin said he was tough on Coldplay, telling them: "Your songs are too long and you're too repetitive, and you use the same tricks too much, and big things aren't necessarily good things, and you use the same sounds too much, and your lyrics are not good enough."

== Recording ==
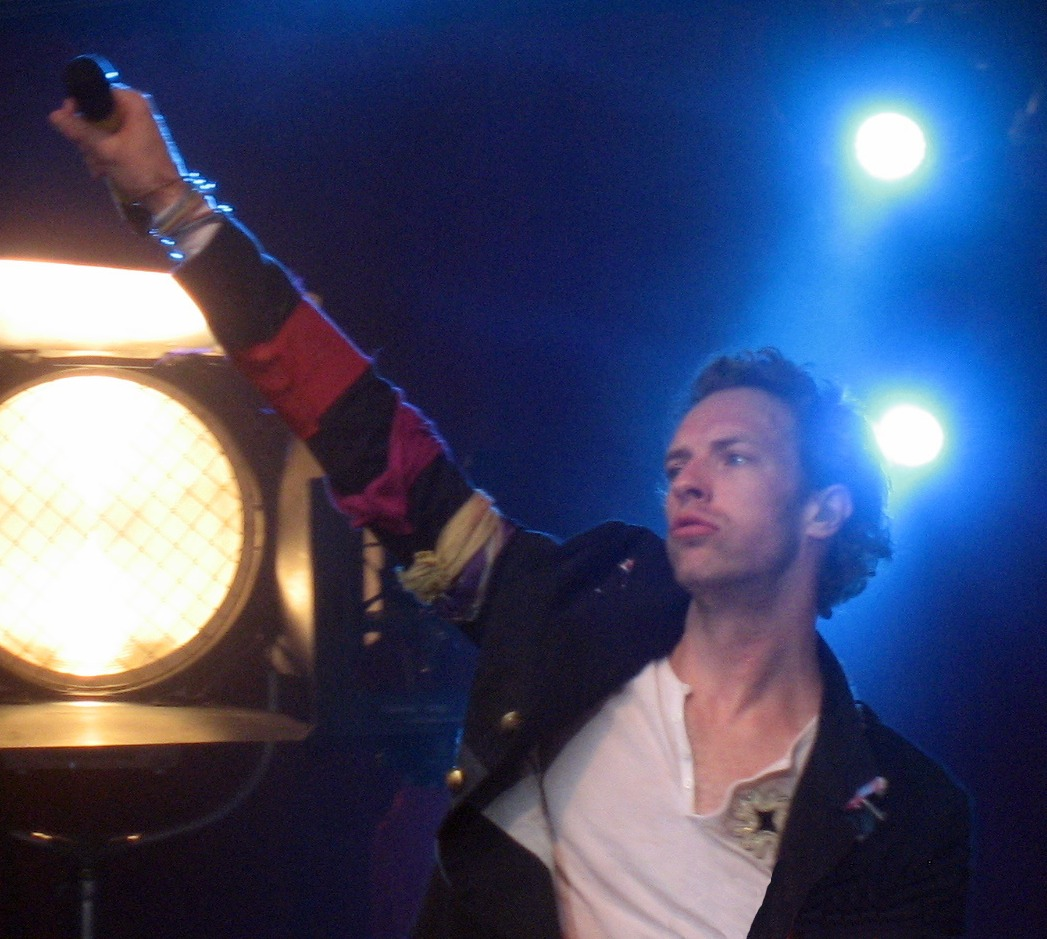
Coldplay used French revolutionary costumes during their Viva la Vida Tour as a reference to the album's revolutionary themes

Work on Viva la Vida began in November 2006, interrupted by the final leg of the Twisted Logic Tour in early 2007. Coldplay built a studio in the Bakery, London. The songs written during their time at the studio were lyrically "much more abstract, much more visual than before", and musically "less straight-forward, more oblique". Additionally, Martin wanted to make a vocal transition from his trademark falsetto to a lower register. This is explored in "Yes", where the main characteristic of the Velvet Underground–inspired song is the lowest vocals Chris Martin ever recorded; this was suggested by the producer Eno, to make every single song sound different. The band's drummer Will Champion said in an interview for MTV: "One of the main things we tried to focus on with this record is changing vocal identities, because Chris has a very recognisable voice." Coldplay became interested in Hispanic influences after having recorded in churches and in Spanish-speaking countries such as in Mexico in North America and Spain in Europe, specifically Barcelona. However, it was stressed that the influence was not in any specific sound but a general feel to the songs taken as a whole. On their website, the band also described taking acoustic guitars and basic recording equipment to churches and experimenting with particular sounds.

Throughout the recording of the album, Coldplay communicated to fans through their website. "Famous Old Painters" and "Glass of Water" were written in late 2007, and they were considering both tracks for the album; however, they were not well received by the producers, though the latter was added to the finalised Prospekt's March extended play track listing instead. The album was delayed further, but a December 2007 post gave hints that the recording stage was nearly finished. The article was signed "Prospekt", strengthening rumours that this would be the album's title. While the band completed two more songs ("Lovers in Japan" and "Strawberry Swing"), they denied that the album was called "Prospekt". Martin revealed he had been reading many Charles Dickens novels during the recording process which may have contributed to the strong visual imagery on such tracks as "Violet Hill" and "Cemeteries of London".

When asked about why "Lovers in Japan/Reign of Love" had an additional song, bassist Guy Berryman explained that the band had wanted to keep the album concise with a total of ten tracks. Champion followed with, "We just preferred to have less titles and more stuff. The album as a whole has got the most on it, but it's the shortest. We wanted to make it almost impossible for you to not listen to it all in one go."

The Italian violinist and composer Davide Rossi collaborated with Coldplay to record strings on his acoustic and electric violin (the latter being capable of reaching notes as low as the upright bass, thus recreating a full orchestra) throughout the album. His strings are featured in six songs: "Viva la Vida" (the song in which his strings are the most used), "Violet Hill", "Life in Technicolor", "42", "Yes" and "Strawberry Swing". Some of the songs recorded with Rossi did not make the cut for the album but were released on Prospekt's March (2009).

According to Natalie Imbruglia, Coldplay had worked on several versions of "Lukas" during the Viva la Vida sessions. Martin suggested the song to her for her album Come to Life, and she recorded her vocals over the existing material.

== Composition and themes ==
Viva la Vida is generally categorised as a rock album, which has been more specifically described as alternative rock, art rock, pop rock, indie pop and art pop, with dream pop influences. Musically, it contrasts with their previous records. The title track uses an orchestra, while "Lovers in Japan" features a tack piano. "Lost!" is influenced by tribal music, whereas "Strawberry Swing" incorporates Afropop music. Martin described Viva la Vida as a new direction for Coldplay: a change from their past three albums, which they have referred to as a "trilogy". He said the album featured less falsetto, as he allowed his voice's lower register to take precedence, which is particularly evident on such tracks as "Yes" and "Death and All His Friends".

The album contains an array of different themes such as love, war, and revolution. Unlike their previous releases, the album has a more universal approach, dealing less with personal problems and more with issues of humanity. Songs like "Life in Technicolor II" (which didn't make it to the final track list but instead was released on Prospekt's March) and "Death and All His Friends" talk about war and politics, while "Violet Hill" has been described as the first anti-war protest song from the band. Martin stated the lyrics of "Violet Hill" were a commentary on Fox News. Other songs, such as the double track "Lovers in Japan/Reign of Love" and "Yes", are about love and desire.

Revolutionary themes are also prominent throughout the album and its promotion. Coldplay used customised French revolutionary costumes throughout the Viva la Vida Tour and in the videos produced for the album's singles. In an interview for the Latin American TV channel Boomerang in 2010, Martin said that a big inspiration for the record was Victor Hugo's book Les Misérables—which can be noted by the French revolution themes on "Viva la Vida", for example.

The work of the Beatles is apparently an inspiration throughout the album, starting with orchestration on the title track. The song "Violet Hill", with its distorted guitar riffs and bluesy undertones, references Abbey Road (1969), being named after a street near Abbey Road and borrowing its rhythm from the Beatles. At the 2009 Grammy Awards, during their acceptance speech for Song of the Year, Will Champion joked: "I'd like to say, first of all, thank you and sorry to Sir Paul McCartney for blatantly recycling the Sgt. Pepper outfits".

== Artwork ==
Viva la Vida takes its artwork from Eugène Delacroix's 1830 painting Liberty Leading the People.

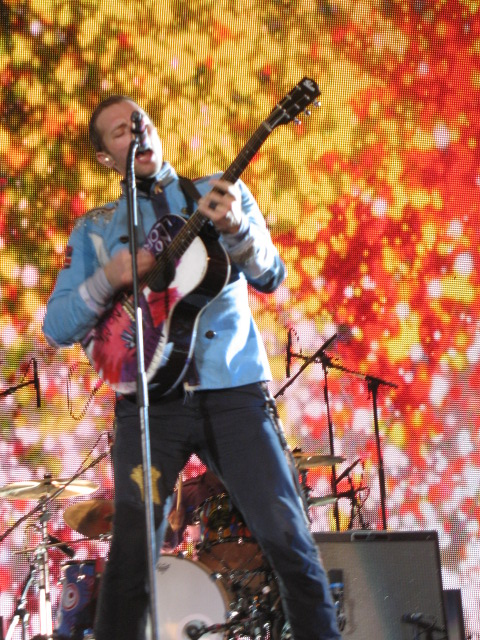
Some of the paintings produced during the creation of the album's artwork were later used on the Viva la Vida Tour screens.

The artwork for Viva la Vida or Death and All His Friends was designed by Coldplay and Tappin Gofton; the latter designed the X&Y cover three years earlier. The design style for the album took months to be completed; it was initially developed from a set of large-scale sketches and paintings of expressive typography. Lyrics and song titles were boldly painted across old maps, books, copies of old paintings, newspapers and various sorts of second-hand things. The final work was photographed and some additional typography was later added by computer.

Almost all tracks from the album and the Prospekt's March EP have one or more graphic images. On the album's booklet there are nine paintings made by the band. The first is a blue map of Brazil that includes part of the lyrics from "Glass of Water" painted in white. However, the image was later reworked and used as the artwork for the "Lost!" single cover. The second painting on the booklet illustrates the song "42". The image consists of part of the song's composition written in a red background, with a black stripe covering the centre. The design for "Cemeteries of London" contains an illustration of London, the song's title and a messy violet background. A portion of the lyrics is used on the top of it. The visual design for "Reign of Love" has its lyrics drawn on a green background. In the middle of the booklet, most of the lyrics of the album are shown amidst an unrecognisable object. The artwork for "Yes" consists of a ripped heart, and a line from the song, "Lord lead me not into temptation". The painting next to the song's artwork contains lyrics from "Viva la Vida" painted in black on a blue background. The artwork for "Death and All His Friends" was made with scissors and paper. Lyrics for the song appear in the design. The last page in the booklet is simple: a Roman numeral of the number 7 painted in red and green on a yellow background. Some of the paintings were shown on a screen during the Viva la Vida Tour, or used on big balloons inside of the venues.

There were three covers for the album. The front cover for the standard edition is a painting by Eugène Delacroix, entitled Liberty Leading the People, which was slightly altered for the cover by using a white paint brush to draw "VIVA LA VIDA". The Prospekt's March Edition cover uses the same words again, but they are bigger and painted in gold on a solid black background. The cover for the Prospekt's March EP included another Eugène Delacroix painting, Battle of Poitiers, and had "Prospekt's March" drawn across the painting similarly to how "Viva la Vida" was drawn across Liberty Leading the People for the standard album cover. The cover used for the Asian Tour edition and has the word "VIVA" painted in red and black stripes against a white background; this same painting was used as the home page for the official Coldplay website for a while, and it was created by the band and painted by the drummer Will Champion on a wall at the Bakery.

== Release and promotion ==
In a Rolling Stone magazine interview, vocalist Chris Martin announced the album's release date and its title, Viva la Vida, which is a Spanish phrase that means in English "long live life". It takes its name from a painting by Frida Kahlo, an acclaimed 20th-century Mexican artist. The album cover art is an 1830 painting by Eugène Delacroix titled Liberty Leading the People. On 10 April 2008, a new journal entry appeared on the band's website announcing the track list and release date, as well as hinting at new tracks to be issued before the album's release. "Violet Hill" was confirmed as the first single from Viva la Vida, with a release date of 5 May. In May 2008, Coldplay featured in an advertisement for Apple's iTunes with the song "Viva la Vida".

The band's official website was updated in late April to reveal the official Viva la Vida artwork as well as a free release of the single "Violet Hill", which became available for download for one week from 29 April 2008. The album was leaked around 5 June, so the band decided to make the album available to stream via their Myspace profile from 8:30 pm WEST on 6 June. On 25 June 2008, the band became the third band ever to perform on The Daily Show with Jon Stewart, performing "42" and "Lost!". On 27 June at 7:00 am EDT, Coldplay began a live outdoor performance for the Today Show on the streets outside of Rockefeller Plaza, New York. The band performed on the Late Show with David Letterman on 30 June and on The Tonight Show with Jay Leno on 17 July.

In August 2008, Coldplay announced an EP, Prospekt's March, consisting of unreleased material from the Viva la Vida recording sessions. The album was re-released on 25 November 2008 in a deluxe edition, Viva la Vida – Prospekt's March Edition. It contains tracks from the original album and Prospekt's March.

The stage setup for the Viva la Vida Tour consisted of a stripped-down main stage and two catwalks; Coldplay also performed among audience members at the back of venues in a special acoustic set. Instead of a giant video screen on-stage, the band opted for six hanging giant lightbulbs that displayed images and closeups. The band started the tour playing a concert at the Paradiso in the Netherlands, on 5 June 2008, and played their first UK show of the tour at Brixton Academy eleven days later on 16 June. Free shows at Madison Square Garden on 23 June, and they ended the tour in Barcelona.

== Critical reception ==
=== Reviews ===
Professional ratings
Aggregate scores
Source	Rating
Metacritic	72/100
Review scores
Source	Rating
AllMusic	4.5/5 stars
The A.V. Club	B+
Entertainment Weekly	A−
The Guardian	3/5 stars
Los Angeles Times	3/4 stars
NME	8/10
Pitchfork	6.9/10
Q	4/5 stars
Rolling Stone	3.5/5 stars
Spin	4.5/5 stars

Viva la Vida or Death and All His Friends received generally positive reviews. On the review aggregator website Metacritic, the album has a weighted average score of 72 out of 100 based on 32 reviews, indicating "generally favorable reviews". Stephen Thomas Erlewine of Allmusic stated, "They demonstrate a focused concentration throughout this tight album – it's only 47 minutes yet covers more ground than X&Y and arguably A Rush of Blood to the Head – that turns Viva la Vida into something quietly satisfying." Chris Willman of Entertainment Weekly magazine rated the album "A−" and called it their best album, while Alexis Petridis of The Guardian, however, wrote a mixed review, explaining: "Viva la Vida's mild tinkering with the formula represents a failure of imagination: perhaps it's hard to think outside the box when the box is the size of the Las Vegas MGM Grand Garden Arena. Equally, however, there's a genuine conviction about its contents, a huge advance both on its predecessor and their legion of imitators."

Will Hermes of Rolling Stone magazine wrote that "Coldplay's desire to unite fans around the world with an entertainment they can all relate to is the band's strength, and a worthy goal. But on Viva la Vida, a record that wants to make strong statements, it's also a weakness. Sometimes, to say what needs to be said, you need to risk pissing people off." Melodic magazine's critic Kaj Roth gave the album 4/5 and felt that "the typical Coldplay trademark is there too with beautiful atmospheric melodies that will embrace the heart". The Spin critic Mikael Wood said in a positive review of the album, "For all of Coldplay's experimentation, though, there's no doubting that Viva la Vida, with its sturdy melodies and universal themes – think love, war and peace – is an album meant to connect with the masses (arenas have been built for less than the climax of "Death and All His Friends"). The band's triumph lies in how exciting they make that prospect seem". IGN gave the album 9.3/10, while Q said: "So some habits die hard, but on every other level Viva La Vida [...] is an emphatic success [...], radical in its own measured way but easy to embrace". Robert Christgau gave it a one-star honourable mention, saying: "Applying all his powers, Chris Martin successfully dilutes Radiohead, with—what else? Pleasant results".

The album won the Grammy Award for Best Rock Album at the 2009 Grammy Awards. It appeared in several Best Albums of 2008 lists, including New York Post (Number 1), Rolling Stone (Number 7), Q (Number 3), Spin (Number 9), Entertainment Weekly (Number 6), and Billboard (Number 6). Despite giving the album three stars out of five in The Times, Pete Paphides admitted in December 2008 that he was wrong to give it this score and had in fact become his favourite album of the year. Conversely, NME nominated the album for Worst Album at the 2009 NME Awards despite reviewing it with a 8/10 grade.

=== Rankings ===
List of critic rankings
Publication	Year	Description	Result	Ref.
AllMusic	2008	Favorite Albums of 2008	Placed	
Beats Per Minute	2008	The Top 30 Albums of 2008	15	
Billboard	2008	10 Best Albums of 2008	6	
Blender	2008	33 Best Albums of 2008	22	
Consequence	2008	The Top 100 Albums of 2008	50	
Currys	2024	The Most Memorable Album Covers	20	
Entertainment Weekly	2008	Top 10 Albums of 2008	6	
The Guardian	2008	2008 in Review – 50 Albums of the Year	25	
Loudwire	2025	The Best Alt-Rock Album of Each Year of the 2000s	Placed	
New York Post	2008	Best Albums of 2008	1	
Newsweek	2021	50 Best Rock Albums from the 21st Century	47	
NME	2008	Top 50 Albums of 2008	31	
PopMatters	2008	The Best Albums of 2008	58	
Q	2008	Recordings of the Year – 2008	3	
Q	2010	Albums of the 21st Century	5	
Q	2016	The Greatest Albums of the Last 30 Years	Placed	
Radio X	2023	The 25 Best Albums of 2008	Placed	
Rolling Stone	2008	50 Best Albums of 2008	7	
Rolling Stone	2011	100 Best Albums of the 2000s	85	
Spin	2008	Best Albums of 2008	9	
The Times	2009	The 100 Best Pop Albums of the Noughties	17	
Uncut	2024	The 500 Greatest Albums of the 2000s	445	
Under the Radar	2008	Best Albums of 2008	27	
WXPN	2021	All Time Greatest Albums	590	

== Accolades ==
List of awards and nominations
Year	Ceremony	Category	Result	Ref.
2008	American Music Awards	Favorite Pop/Rock Album	Nominated	
2008	Gaffa Awards (Denmark)	International Album of the Year	Nominated	
2008	Guinness World Records	Fastest-Selling Digital Album in the UK	Broken	
2008	Guinness World Records	Best-Selling Digital Album in the UK	Broken	
2008	MTV Europe Music Awards	Best Album	Nominated	
2008	Q Awards	Best Album	Won	
2008	Rockbjörnen Awards	Best International Album	Won	
2008	TMF Awards	Best International Album	Won	
2009	Anděl Awards	Foreign Album of the Year	Won	
2009	Brit Awards	British Album of the Year	Nominated	
2009	Danish Music Awards	International Album of the Year	Nominated	
2009	Fryderyk Awards	Best Foreign Album	Nominated	
2009	Grammy Awards	Album of the Year	Nominated	
2009	Grammy Awards	Best Rock Album	Won	
2009	Hungarian Music Awards	Foreign Alternative Album of the Year	Nominated	
2009	IFPI Awards	Global Album of 2008	Won	
2009	Ivor Novello Awards	Best Album	Nominated	
2009	Japan Gold Disc Awards	Album of the Year (Western)	Won	
2009	Japan Gold Disc Awards	Best 3 Albums (Western)	Won	
2009	Juno Awards	International Album of the Year	Won	
2009	Meteor Music Awards	Best International Album	Nominated	
2009	MTV Video Music Awards Japan	Best Album of the Year	Nominated	
2009	Music Producers Guild Awards	UK Album of the Year	Nominated	
2009	NME Awards	Worst Album	Nominated	
2009	NRJ Music Awards	International Album of the Year	Nominated	
2009	Porin Awards	Best International Album	Nominated	
2009	Swiss Music Awards	Best Pop/Rock International Album	Nominated	
2009	TEC Awards	Record Production / Album	Won	
2009	Žebřík Music Awards	Best Foreign Album	1st place	

== Commercial performance ==
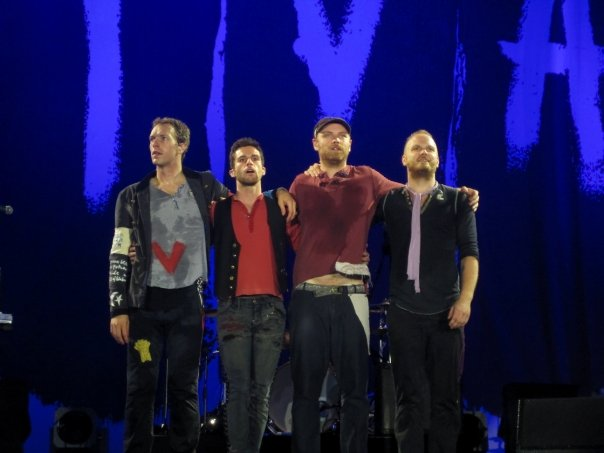
Coldplay after performing at the Viva la Vida Tour in 2008.

Viva la Vida was the best-selling album of 2008, selling 6.8 million copies. It reached number one in 36 countries. EMI shipped over 3 million copies in its first week worldwide. On iTunes, Viva la Vida broke the record for most pre-orders and most weekly sales. In the UK, Viva la Vida surpassed 125,000 copies on its first day and 302,074 in three days, entering the UK Albums Chart at number one despite having an unconventional release date. 10 days later, it reached 500,000 total copies sold in the UK, eclipsing the first-week numbers of X&Y. It spent 11 non-consecutive weeks at number one on the European Top 100 Albums chart from June to September 2008.

In Australia, Viva la Vida debuted with 41,041 copies and was later certified four-times platinum. It entered the Canadian Albums Chart at number one with 90,000 copies. In the US, it sold over 316,000 copies in a day and 721,207 in a week. Viva la Vida was also the most downloaded album of the 2000s in the US. Billboard ranked it the 145th-most successful album of the 21st century, the eighth-best placement for an international group. In Japan, Viva la Vida debuted at number five with 38,573 copies sold. It rose to number three the following week, selling 44,601 copies. The Prospekt's March edition entered the Oricon Albums Chart at number 232 with 610 copies, eventually rising to number 25 with 4,751 copies.

== Legacy ==
Shawn Cooke from Billboard considered Viva la Vida or Death and All His Friends the "last massive experimental rock album" when writing its tenth-anniversary review, mentioning how "We haven 't seen another super-popular, multi-platinum rock record with a No. 1 single really swing for the fences" ever since. The album has been retroactively described as transitional, being simultaneously "the most Coldplay record" and "unlike anything they'd done before", since the band continued to explore new styles and genres in subsequent releases. Finneas O'Connell has cited both Viva la Vida and Coldplay themselves as influences for his career. The album was also one of the inspirations for his sister Billie Eilish's When We All Fall Asleep, Where Do We Go? (2019), and Hit Me Hard and Soft (2024).

== Track listing ==
All tracks are written by Coldplay, with production from Brian Eno, Markus Dravs and Rik Simpson, except where noted.

Viva la Vida – standard edition track listing
No.	Title	Writer(s)	Producer(s)	Length
1.	"Life in Technicolor"	Coldplay; Jon Hopkins	Eno; Dravs; Hopkins	2:29
2.	"Cemeteries of London"			3:21
3.	"Lost!"			3:55
4.	"42"			3:57
5.	"Lovers in Japan/Reign of Love"			6:51
6.	"Yes"			7:06
7.	"Viva la Vida"			4:01
8.	"Violet Hill"			3:42
9.	"Strawberry Swing"			4:09
10.	"Death and All His Friends"	Coldplay; Hopkins	Eno; Dravs; Simpson; Hopkins	6:18
Total length:				45:51

Viva la Vida – Japanese edition bonus track
No.	Title	Length
11.	"Lost?"	3:42
Total length:		49:34

Notes

- "Yes" contains the hidden track "Chinese Sleep Chant", which begins at 4:05.
- "Death and All His Friends" contains the hidden track "The Escapist", which begins at 3:32.

Sample credits

- "Life in Technicolor" and "The Escapist" contain a sample of "Light Through the Veins" (written by Jon Hopkins).

== Personnel ==
Credits adapted from AllMusic.

Coldplay

- Guy Berryman
- Jonny Buckland
- Will Champion
- Chris Martin
- Phil Harvey

Additional personnel

- Michael Brauer – mixing
- François Chevallier – assistant engineer, engineer
- Coldplay – artwork
- Eugène Delacroix – cover painting
- Markus Dravs – mixing, producer
- Brian Eno – producer, sonic landscapes
- Olga Fitzroy – assistant engineer, engineer
- Tappin Gofton – art direction, design
- Dan Green – assistant engineer, engineer, photography
- Phil Harvey – manager
- William Paden Hensley – assistant engineer, engineer
- Dave Holmes – management
- Jon Hopkins – "colouring", producer
- Jason Lader – assistant engineer, engineer
- Bob Ludwig – mastering
- Dominic Monks – assistant engineer, engineer
- John O'Mahoney – mixing
- Vanessa Parr – assistant engineer, engineer
- Jan Petrov – assistant engineer, engineer
- Davide Rossi – strings
- Andy Rugg – assistant engineer, engineer
- Rik Simpson – mixing, producer
- Brian Thorn – assistant engineer, engineer
- Michael Trepagnier – assistant engineer, engineer
- Andy Wallace – mixing

== Charts ==
=== Weekly charts ===
Weekly chart performance
Chart (2008–2016)	Peak position
Argentine Albums (CAPIF)	1
Australian Albums (ARIA)	1
Austrian Albums (Ö3 Austria)	1
Belgian Albums (Ultratop Flanders)	1
Belgian Albums (Ultratop Wallonia)	1
Brazilian Albums (ABPD)	3
Canadian Albums (Billboard)	1
Chilean Albums (IFPI)	1
Croatian International Albums (HDU)	1
Czech Albums (ČNS IFPI)	2
Danish Albums (Hitlisten)	1
Dutch Albums (Album Top 100)	1
European Top 100 Albums (Billboard)	1
Finnish Albums (Suomen virallinen lista)	1
French Albums (SNEP)	1
German Albums (Offizielle Top 100)	1
Greek Albums (IFPI)	1
Hungarian Albums (MAHASZ)	4
Icelandic Albums (Tónlistinn)	4
Irish Albums (IRMA)	1
Italian Albums (FIMI)	1
Japanese Albums (Oricon)	3
Japanese Top Albums Sales (Billboard Japan)	5
Mexican Albums (Top 100 Mexico)	2
New Zealand Albums (RMNZ)	1
Norwegian Albums (VG-lista)	1
Polish Albums (ZPAV)	2
Portuguese Albums (AFP)	1
Scottish Albums (Official Charts)	1
South Korean Albums (Gaon)	84
South Korean International Albums (Gaon)	11
Spanish Albums (Promusicae)	1
Swedish Albums (Sverigetopplistan)	1
Swiss Albums (Schweizer Hitparade)	1
Taiwanese Albums (Five Music)	1
UK Albums (Official Charts)	1
US Billboard 200	1
US Top Catalog Albums (Billboard)	3
US Top Rock & Alternative Albums (Billboard)	1

Weekly chart performance (Prospekt's March edition)
Chart (2009)	Peak position
Japanese Albums (Oricon)	25
Japanese Top Albums Sales (Billboard Japan)	32

=== Monthly charts ===
Monthly chart performance
Chart (2008)	Peak position
Argentine Albums (CAPIF)	1
Japanese Albums (Oricon)	8
South Korean International Albums (MIAK)	1
Uruguayan Albums (CUD)	1

=== Year-end charts ===
Year-end chart performance
Chart (2008)	Position
Argentine Albums (CAPIF)	4
Australian Albums (ARIA)	4
Austrian Albums (Ö3 Austria)	8
Belgian Albums (Ultratop Flanders)	2
Belgian Albums (Ultratop Wallonia)	6
Belgian Alternative Albums (Ultratop Flanders)	1
Canadian Albums (Billboard)	3
Croatian Albums (HDU)	13
Danish Albums (Hitlisten)	15
Dutch Albums (Album Top 100)	4
European Albums (Billboard)	3
Finnish Albums (Suomen viralinen lista)	7
French Albums (SNEP)	5
German Albums (Offizielle Top 100)	6
Greek Albums (IFPI)	34
Greek Foreign Albums (IFPI Greece)	8
Hungarian Albums (MAHASZ)	46
Irish Albums (IRMA)	7
Italian Albums (FIMI)	10
Japanese Albums (Oricon)	33
Japanese Top Albums Sales (Billboard Japan)	47
Mexican Albums (Top 100 Mexico)	39
New Zealand Albums (RMNZ)	6
Norwegian Albums (VG-lista)	6
Spanish Albums (Promusicae)	15
Swedish Albums (Sverigetopplistan)	7
Swedish Albums & Compilations (Sverigetopplistan)	11
Swiss Albums (Schweizer Hitparade)	4
Turkish Albums (Mü-Yap)	11
UK Albums (OCC)	5
US Alternative Albums (Billboard)	2
US Billboard 200	7
US Top Rock Albums (Billboard)	3
Worldwide Albums (IFPI)	1

Chart (2009)	Position
Australian Albums (ARIA)	23
Belgian Albums (Ultratop Flanders)	9
Belgian Albums (Ultratop Wallonia)	25
Belgian Alternative Albums (Ultratop Flanders)	4
Canadian Albums (Billboard)	45
Danish Albums (Hitlisten)	81
Dutch Albums (Album Top 100)	13
European Albums (Billboard)	12
French Albums (SNEP)	36
German Albums (Offizielle Top 100)	49
Italian Albums (FIMI)	36
New Zealand Albums (RMNZ)	44
Spanish Albums (Promusicae)	17
Swedish Albums (Sverigetopplistan)	97
Swiss Albums (Schweizer Hitparade)	45
UK Albums (OCC)	75
US Alternative Albums (Billboard)	8
US Billboard 200	39
US Top Rock Albums (Billboard)	12

Chart (2010)	Position
Belgian Midprice Albums (Ultratop Flanders)	46
Italian Albums (FIMI)	98

Chart (2011)	Position
Belgian Midprice Albums (Ultratop Flanders)	11
Belgian Midprice Albums (Ultratop Wallonia)	16
Italian Albums (FIMI)	82
UK Albums (OCC)	175

Chart (2017)	Position
South Korean International Albums (Gaon)	92

Chart (2023)	Position
Dutch Albums (Album Top 100)	99

=== Decade-end charts ===
Decade-end chart performance
Chart (2000–2009)	Position
Australian Albums (ARIA)	52
Dutch Albums (Album Top 100)	25
UK Albums (OCC)	90
US Billboard 200	168

== Certifications and sales ==
Certifications and sales
Region	Certification	Certified units/sales
Argentina (CAPIF)	2× Platinum	80,000^{^}
Australia (ARIA)	4× Platinum	280,000^{^}
Austria (IFPI Austria)	2× Platinum	40,000^{*}
Belgium (BRMA)	3× Platinum	90,000^{*}
Brazil (Pro-Música Brasil)	Platinum	60,000^{*}
Canada (Music Canada)	5× Platinum	400,000^{^}
Chile (IFPI Chile)	Platinum	15,000 (Note: Chilean certified sales for Viva la Vida or Death and All His Friends as of October 2011.)
Colombia (ASINCOL)	3× Platinum	30,000 (Note: Colombian certified sales for Viva la Vida or Death and All His Friends as of March 2010.)
Denmark (IFPI Danmark)	5× Platinum	100,000^{‡}
Finland (Musiikkituottajat)	Platinum	21,991 (Note: Finnish total sales for Viva la Vida or Death and All His Friends as of December 2008.)
France (SNEP)	Diamond	650,000 (Note: French total sales for Viva la Vida or Death and All His Friends as of October 2011.)
Germany (BVMI)	7× Gold	700,000^{‡}
Greece (IFPI Greece)	Gold	7,500^{^}
Hong Kong (IFPI Hong Kong)	Platinum	15,000^{*}
Hungary (MAHASZ)	Gold	3,000^{^}
Ireland (IRMA)	4× Platinum	60,000^{^}
Italy (FIMI)	2× Platinum	170,000 (Note: Italian year-end sales for Viva la Vida or Death and All His Friends in 2008.)
Italy (FIMI) Sales since 2009	2× Platinum	100,000^{*}
Japan (RIAJ)	Platinum	357,135 (Note: Japanese physical sales for Viva la Vida or Death and All His Friends as of June 2014.)
Malaysia (RIM)	Platinum	10,000 (Note: Malaysian certified sales for Viva la Vida or Death and All His Friends as of June 2013.)
Mexico (AMPROFON)	Platinum	80,000^{^}
Mexico (AMPROFON) Pre-loaded album	2× Diamond+4× Platinum	1,200,000^{^}
Netherlands (NVPI)	3× Platinum	180,000^{‡}
New Zealand (RMNZ)	4× Platinum	60,000^{‡}
Norway (IFPI Norway)	3× Platinum	90,000^{*}
Philippines (PARI)	Platinum	15,000^{*}
Poland (ZPAV)	Platinum	20,000^{*}
Portugal (AFP)	2× Platinum	40,000^{^}
Russia (NFPF)	Platinum	20,000^{*}
Singapore (RIAS)	Platinum	10,000^{*}
South Africa (RISA)	Platinum	40,000^{*}
South Korea	—	11,122 (Note: South Korean combined physical sales for Viva la Vida or Death and All His Friends based on June 2008, July 2008, and year-end 2017.)
Spain (Promusicae)	2× Platinum	160,000^{^}
Sweden (GLF)	Platinum	40,000^{^}
Switzerland (IFPI Switzerland)	3× Platinum	90,000^{^}
Taiwan (RIT)	Gold	5,000^{*}
Turkey (Mü-Yap)	Gold	6,600 (Note: Turkish year-end sales for Viva la Vida or Death and All His Friends in 2008.)
United Kingdom (BPI)	5× Platinum	1,500,000^{‡}
United States (RIAA)	2× Platinum	2,800,000 (Note: American total sales for Viva la Vida or Death and All His Friends as of August 2012.)
Summaries
Europe (IFPI)	3× Platinum	3,000,000^{*}
^{*} Sales figures based on certification alone.^{^} Shipments figures based on certification alone.^{‡} Sales+streaming figures based on certification alone.

== Release history ==
Release date and formats
Country	Date	Label	Format	Catalog number
United Kingdom	12 June 2008	Parlophone	CD	5 099921 211409
United Kingdom	12 June 2008	Parlophone	LP	50999 212114 1 6
Brazil	12 June 2008	EMI	CD	
Europe	13 June 2008	Capitol	CD	
Australia and New Zealand	14 June 2008	EMI	CD	2169640
Canada	17 June 2008	Capitol	CD	509992 26126 0 1
United States	17 June 2008	Capitol	CD	50999 2 16886 0 7
United States	17 June 2008	Capitol	LP	50999 2 16965 1 0

== See also ==
- 2008 in British music
- List of fastest-selling albums
- List of best-selling albums of the 21st century
- List of best-selling albums in France
- List of best-selling albums in Mexico
- List of best-selling albums in Turkey
- List of best-selling albums of the 2000s (decade) in the United Kingdom
- List of best-selling albums of 2008 in Ireland
- List of number-one albums in Argentina
- List of number-one albums in Norway
- List of Billboard 200 number-one albums of 2008
- List of number-one albums of 2008 (Australia)
- List of number-one albums of 2008 (Canada)
- List of number-one albums of 2008 (Finland)
- List of number-one albums of 2008 (Ireland)
- List of number-one albums of 2008 (Portugal)
- List of number-one albums of 2008 (Spain)
- List of number-one hits of 2008 (Europe)
- List of number-one hits of 2008 (Austria)
- List of number-one hits of 2008 (France)
- List of number-one hits of 2008 (Germany)
- List of number-one hits of 2008 (Italy)
- List of number-one hits of 2008 (Sweden)
- List of number-one hits of 2008 (Switzerland)
- List of number-one albums from the 2000s (Denmark)
- List of number-one albums from the 2000s (New Zealand)
- List of UK Albums Chart number ones of the 2000s
