= Markus Dravs =

Music producer

- Genres: Alternative rock; indie rock; indie folk; art rock; hip-hop; electronica
- Occupations: Record producer; songwriter; musician; remixer; engineer
- Years active: 1992–present
- Website: markusdravs.com

Markus Dravs is a British music producer, songwriter, programmer, engineer and mixer. His credits include Arcade Fire, Coldplay, Wolf Alice, Björk, Brian Eno, Sheep on Drugs, Merz, Mumford & Sons, Hozier, Florence and the Machine, The Last Dinner Party, The Maccabees and Kings of Leon.

He has won three Grammy Awards, four Billboard Music Awards and three Brit Awards for his production work. At the 53rd Grammy Awards he won Album of the Year for Arcade Fire's The Suburbs. At the 55th Grammy Awards, he won the Album of the Year for Mumford & Sons' Babel. In 2009 at the 51st Grammy Awards, Dravs won Best Rock Album for Coldplay's Viva la Vida or Death and All His Friends.

Dravs won Producer of the Year at the 2011 Brit Awards. He was also nominated for Producer of the Year, Non-Classical at the 55th annual session of the Grammy Awards in 2013.

== Career ==
After hearing Brian Eno's collaboration with David Byrne My Life in the Bush of Ghosts, he decided to get into engineering. He started out at Westside/Hookend Manor and learnt his initial skills from the then owners, Clive Langer and Alan Winstanley, before moving to Metropolis, where he assisted under Gary Langan, before working under Brian Eno for the next few years. He went on to get his first co-production credit on Eno's album Nerve Net in 1992 and they subsequently worked together on productions, including 12" remixes for Depeche Mode, The Grid, and 808 State.

His work on albums include Björk's Homogenic, James's Wah Wah, and three Arcade Fire albums Neon Bible, The Suburbs and Reflektor.

He worked with Coldplay on their 2008 album Viva la Vida or Death and All His Friends, and their 2011 album Mylo Xyloto. According to Markus: "Chris Martin called me and told me he had a conversation with Win Butler, who suggested, He'll kick you into shape, which was poetic for "He will do his utmost in helping you to develop your artistic horizon".

In 2011 Dravs received acclaim for producing Mumford & Sons' debut album, Sigh No More, and Arcade Fire's The Suburbs. Sigh No More won Best British Album, and The Suburbs won Best International Album, at the 2011 BRIT Awards. The Suburbs also won the Grammy for Album of the Year.

In conjunction with Kobalt Music Group, Dravs has started up a publishing and production company called Casa-D. According to Markus "The idea behind Casa-D Productions is to form a creative hub, from which I can collaborate with other musicians, top line writers and lyricists to write and/or produce new songs both for other artists and for release ourselves via Casa-D." Dravs produced the third album from Florence + the Machine, entitled How Big, How Blue, How Beautiful, released on 1 June 2015. He has also co-written two tracks on the album, "Queen of Peace" and "Various Storms & Saints".

Dravs produced Kings of Leon's Walls album released in October 2016, which went on to be the band's first joint UK and US number-one record.

Arcade Fire's Everything Now was released in June 2017 and featured tracks co-produced by Dravs.

Dravs produced the second Hozier record Wasteland, Baby! released in March 2019. The record scored number one chart positions in the US.

Dravs co-produced the track "Baby Mine" by Arcade Fire from Tim Burton's Dumbo released in March 2019.

Dravs produced Wolf Alice's third album, Blue Weekend, released in June 2021.

Dravs produced The Last Dinner Party's second studio album, From the Pyre, released in October 2025.

== Awards and nominations ==
=== Grammy Awards ===
Year	Nominee / work	Award	Result
2009	"Viva la Vida"	Record of the Year	Nominated
2009	Viva la Vida or Death and All His Friends	Best Rock Album	Won
2009	Viva la Vida or Death and All His Friends	Album of the Year	Nominated
2011	The Suburbs	Album of the Year	Won
2012	"The Cave"	Record of the Year	Nominated
2013	Babel	Album of the Year	Won
2013	Mylo Xyloto	Best Rock Album	Nominated
2013	Himself	Producer of the Year, Non-Classical	Nominated
