= List of cover versions of Coldplay songs =

Covers of songs by British band

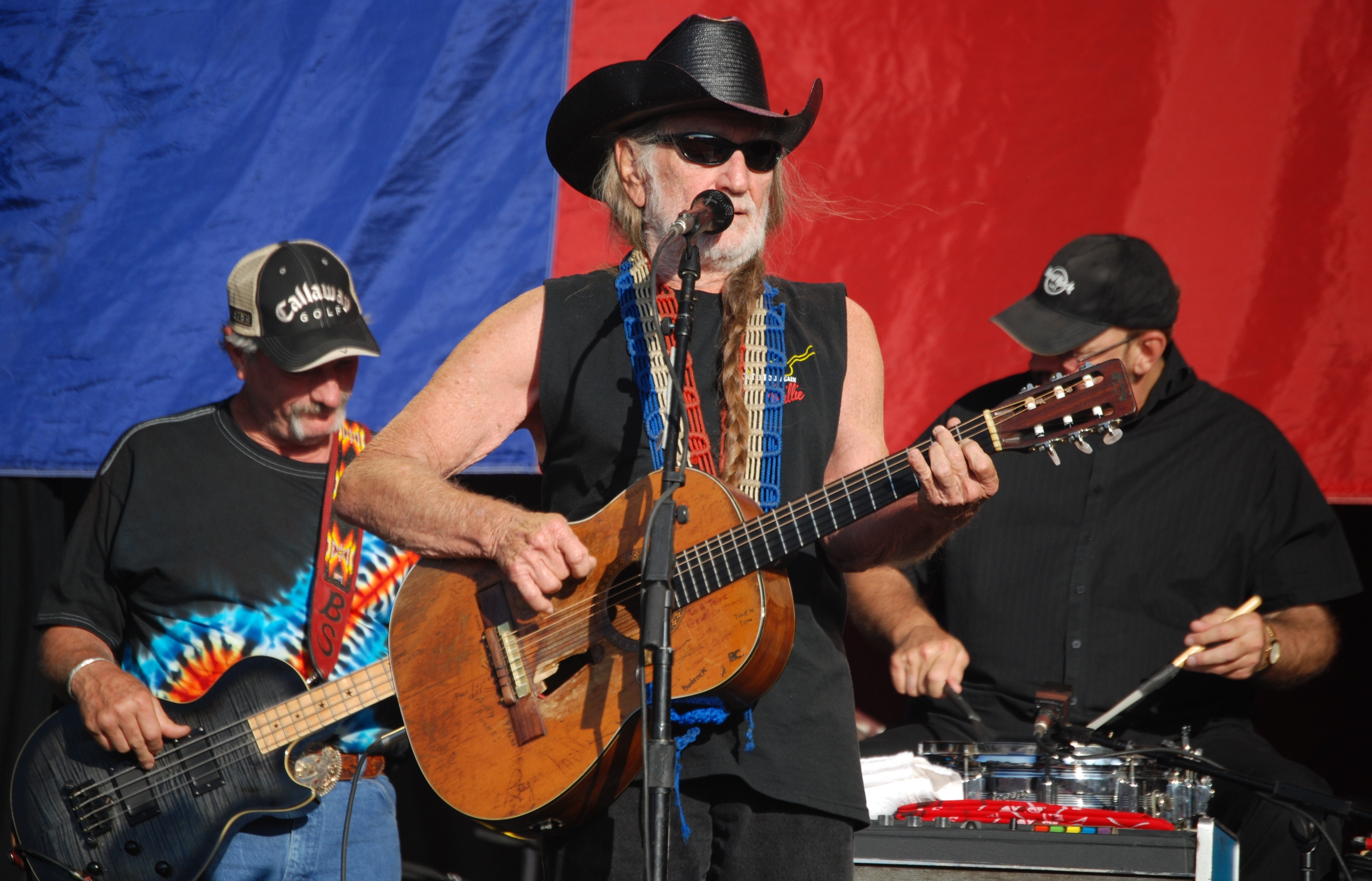
American singer Willie Nelson (pictured in 2009) covered "The Scientist" for Chipotle.

British rock band Coldplay have been covered by numerous entertainers around the world since the launch of Parachutes (2000) and subsequent albums. According to the BBC, they are the most covered group in the history of Live Lounge, a segment from Radio 1 during which artists usually perform songs from their peers. Moreover, publications including Billboard, Bustle, and Stereogum have all conceived listicles ranking the best new versions of songs written by the band. These covers encompass several languages, such as Chinese ("Yellow" by Katherine Ho), French ("The Scientist" by Diane Tell), and Hindi ("Paradise" by Anmol Malik), while distinct genres can be found in the Piano Guys, and Mark Ronson.

Some renditions have also achieved notability on their own, as Darin's "Viva la Vida" reached number one in the Swedish Singles Chart, whereas Glee's "Fix You" entered the American, Australian, British, and Canadian rankings. In 2011, Willie Nelson covered "The Scientist" for Chipotle's Back to the Start campaign, which promoted sustainable farming practices. NME praised his version for having a previously unheard "terse fragility". Similarly, The Telegraph described it as a "stately country lament" and argued he "travels emotionally to places the original only hinted at". During the following year, Nelson scored wins at ceremonies such as the Clio Awards, D&AD Awards, and London International Awards for his cover. (Note: The London International Awards was established in 1986 to honour excellence in advertising based on a peer-voted selection process.)

== Selection ==
Key
†	Indicates a cover version not released as a standalone single or part of an album

List of cover versions
Artist	Nationality	Year	Title	Release medium	Ref.
2Cellos	Croatia	2011	"Viva la Vida"	2Cellos	
2Cellos	Croatia	2012	"Clocks"	In2ition	
2Cellos	Croatia	2013	"Every Teardrop Is a Waterfall"	Non-album single	
The Abrams	United States	2011	"Viva la Vida"	Northern Redemption	
All Angels	England	2007	"The Scientist"	Into Paradise	
Kris Allen · Allison Iraheta	United States	2010	"The Scientist"	The Oprah Winfrey Show †	
Ed Alleyne-Johnson	England	2005	"Clocks"	Echoes	
Mark Ambor	United States	2020	"Yellow"	Published on TikTok †	
Daniela Andrade	Honduras · Canada	2013	"Us Against the World"	Covers, Vol. 1	
Anthem Lights	United States	2015	"Fix You"	Covers Part IV	
Gabrielle Aplin	England	2011	"Fix You"	Non-album single (BBC Music Introducing exclusive)	
The April Maze	England · Australia	2012	"Strawberry Swing"	Two	
Lauren Aquilina	England · Malta	2014	"Magic"	Non-album single (BBC Music Introducing exclusive)	
B.o.B	United States	2012	"Paradise"	Live Lounge †	
Jacob Banks	England	2014	"Magic"	Live Lounge †	
James Bay	England	2016	"Hymn for the Weekend"	Live Lounge †	
James Bay	England	2020	"Trouble"	Apple Music Home Session	
James Bay	England	2022	"Yellow"	The Chris Evans Breakfast Show †	
Natasha Bedingfield	England	2006	"The Scientist"	Live Lounge †	
Aloe Blacc	United States	2014	"Magic"	Live Lounge †	
Terence Blanchard	United States	2015	"Midnight"	Breathless	
Blood Orange	England	2025	"Don't Panic"	Live Lounge †	
Benson Boone	United States	2025	"Sparks"	American Heart World Tour †	
Benson Boone	United States	2025	"Yellow"	American Heart World Tour †	
Boyce Avenue	United States	2008	"Viva la Vida"	Acoustic Sessions: Vol. 2	
Boyce Avenue	United States	2009	"Yellow"	Cover Sessions, Vol. 1	
Boyce Avenue	United States	2011	"Fix You"	Cover Sessions, Vol. 2	
Boyce Avenue	United States	2012	"Every Teardrop Is a Waterfall"	Cover Sessions, Vol. 2	
Boyce Avenue	United States	2015	"The Scientist"	Cover Sessions, Vol. 3	
Boyce Avenue	United States	2015	"A Sky Full of Stars"	Cover Sessions, Vol. 3	
Alex Boyé	England · United States	2014	"Magic"	Non-album single	
Susan Boyle	Scotland	2019	"Fix You"	Piano Room †	
Brandy	United States	2014	"Magic"	Non-album single	
Rick Braun	United States	2017	"Yellow"	Around the Horn	
Ali Brustofski	United States	2016	"Adventure of a Lifetime" (Note: Mashup with "Make Me Like You" by Gwen Stefani.)	Non-album single	
BTS	South Korea	2021	"Fix You"	MTV Unplugged †	
BYU Noteworthy	United States	2010	"Viva la Vida"	Defined	
Camila Cabello	United States	2022	"Fix You"	Concert for Ukraine †	
Daniel Caesar	Canada	2023	"Sparks"	Superpowers World Tour †	
Daniel Caesar	Canada	2023	"Swallowed in the Sea"	Superpowers World Tour †	
Dove Cameron	United States	2019	"Hymn for the Weekend"	Non-album single	
Cantamus Girls Choir	England	2005	"Fix You"	Cantamus	
Belinda Carlisle	United States	2005	"The Scientist"	Hit Me, Baby, One More Time †	
Danni Carlos	Brazil	2004	"God Put a Smile upon Your Face"	Rock 'n' Road Again	
Andie Case	United States	2015	"The Scientist" (Note: Mashup with "See You Again" by Wiz Khalifa and "Stay with Me" by Sam Smith.)	Non-album single	
The Celtic Tenors	Ireland	2026	"Viva la Vida"	The Celtic Tenors: Live at The Empire Theatre	
Chance the Rapper	United States	2013	"Fix You"	Social Experiment Tour †	
Chanyeol	South Korea	2021	"A Sky Full of Stars"	The Box: Original Motion Picture Soundtrack	
Rachel Chinouriri	England	2024	"The Scientist"	Spotify Singles	
Tanya Chua	Singapore	2002	"Yellow"	Jupiter	
City of Prague Philharmonic Orchestra	Czech Republic	2008	"Yellow"	Songs Without Words	
Clairity	United States	2016	"Don't Panic"	X-Men: Apocalypse (Trailer) †	
Kelly Clarkson	United States	2012	"Princess of China"	Live Lounge †	
Kelly Clarkson	United States	2021	"Green Eyes"	The Kelly Clarkson Show †	
Kelly Clarkson	United States	2021	"Yellow"	The Kelly Clarkson Show †	
Kelly Clarkson	United States	2023	"Magic"	The Kelly Clarkson Show †	
Kelly Clarkson	United States	2023	"Always in My Head"	The Kelly Clarkson Show †	
Kelly Clarkson	United States	2024	"Fix You"	The Kelly Clarkson Show †	
Richard Clayderman	France	2022	"Viva la Vida"	Forever Love	
Cloud Nothings	United States	2017	"Clocks"	A.V. Undercover †	
Club des Belugas · Iain Mackenzie	Germany	2022	"Viva la Vida"	Non-album single	
Jacob Collier	England	2021	"Fix You"	Non-album single	
Javier Colon	United States	2011	"Fix You"	The Voice †	
Cooly G	England	2012	"Trouble"	Playin' Me	
Miley Cyrus	United States	2014	"The Scientist"	Bangerz Tour †	
Darin	Sweden	2009	"Viva la Vida"	Lovekiller	
The Dartmouth Aires	United States	2003	"Trouble"	Black Tie Affaire	
Marié Digby	United States	2014	"Magic"	Non-album single	
Duckwrth	United States	2024	"Clocks"	ReImagined	
Antoine Dufour	Canada	2010	"Life in Technicolor"	Convergences	
Echosmith	United States	2012	"Princess of China"	Non-album single (YouTube exclusive)	
Echosmith	United States	2020	"Fix You"	Billboard Live at Home †	
Taron Egerton	Wales	2021	"A Sky Full of Stars"	Sing 2: Original Motion Picture Soundtrack	
Taylor Eigsti	United States	2010	"Daylight"	Daylight at Midnight	
Billie Eilish	United States	2025	"Fix You"	Hit Me Hard and Soft: The Tour †	
Elew	United States	2010	"Clocks"	Elew Rockjazz, Vol. 1	
Elew	United States	2012	"God Put a Smile upon Your Face"	Elew Rockjazz, Vol. 2	
Torun Eriksen	Norway	2014	"Fix You"	Visits	
Dominic Fike	United States	2025	"Yellow"	Osheaga Festival †	
Flor	United States	2020	"Yellow"	Reimagined	
Ben Forster	England	2012	"Trouble"	Acoustic Covers	
Ana Free	Portugal	2014	"Magic"	Non-album single	
Cody Fry	United States	2023	"Fix You"	The End	
G4	England	2005	"Yellow"	G4 & Friends	
Lady Gaga	United States	2009	"Viva la Vida"	Live Lounge †	
Pierre Garnier	France	2025	"Fix You"	Chaque Seconde Tour †	
David Garrett	Germany	2012	"Viva la Vida"	Music	
David Garrett	Germany	2017	"Fix You"	Rock Revolution	
Gee Gee & Soluna	Guatemala · Denmark	2003	"In My Place"	Thinking of You	
Shreya Ghoshal	India	2026	"Fix You"	The Unstoppable Tour †	
Glee Cast	United States	2011	"Fix You" (Note: Performed by characters Will Schuester, Artie Abrams and the New Directions.)	Glee: The Music, Volume 7	
Glee Cast	United States	2012	"The Scientist" (Note: Performed by characters Finn Hudson, Blaine Anderson, Santana Lopez, Kurt Hummel, Brittany Pierce, Will Schuester, Emma Pillsbury and Rachel Berry.)	Glee: The Music, Season 4, Volume 1	
Adekunle Gold	Nigeria	2022	"Yellow"	ReImagined at Home †	
Ellie Goulding	England	2010	"Don't Panic"	V Festival †	
Grande1899	Malta	2015	"A Sky Full of Stars"	Minecraft Note Block Songs 4	
Kina Grannis	United States	2011	"Fix You"	Stairwells	
Kina Grannis	United States	2017	"Yellow"	Non-album single	
Catriona Gray	Philippines	2012	"Every Teardrop Is a Waterfall"	Non-album single (YouTube exclusive)	
Gregorian	Germany	2003	"Clocks"	Masters of Chant Chapter IV	
Gregorian	Germany	2007	"Fix You"	Masters of Chant Chapter VI	
Gregorian	Germany	2019	"Viva la Vida"	20/2020	
Petra Haden · Bill Frisell	United States	2003	"Yellow"	Petra Haden & Bill Frisell	
The Harvard Opportunes	United States	2017	"Adventure of a Lifetime"	All Afternoon	
Anne Heaton	United States	2012	"Viva la Vida"	Honeycomb	
Katherine Ho	United States	2018	"Yellow"	Crazy Rich Asians: Original Motion Picture Soundtrack	
Hoops	United States	2020	"Don't Panic"	"English Breakfast"	
Hullabahoos	United States	2013	"Fix You"	Off the Dock	
Illuminati Hotties	United States	2026	"Clocks"	Noise Pop Festival †	
J.Fla	South Korea	2017	"Something Just Like This"	Orchid	
J.Fla	South Korea	2017	"Viva la Vida"	Orchid	
J.Fla	South Korea	2023	"Paradise"	Memories	
J.Fla	South Korea	2023	"Fix You"	Memories	
Jahméne	England	2013	"Fix You"	Love Never Fails	
James	England	2024	"Fix You"	Jo Whiley's Sofa Session †	
Wyclef Jean	Haiti	2017	"Viva la Vida"	Spotify Singles	
Jonas Brothers	United States	2025	"Viva la Vida"	Jonas20: Living the Dream Tour	
Jordana	United States	2023	"Sparks"	Non-album single	
Joy Electric	United States	2009	"Viva la Vida"	Favorites at Play	
Zheng Jun	China	2001	"Yellow" (Note: Released as "Liúxīng" (Chinese: 流星), which translates to "Meteor" or "Shooting Star".)	Meteor Garden †	
Sungha Jung	South Korea	2019	"Magic"	Sungha Jung Cover Compilation 2	
Sungha Jung	South Korea	2019	"The Scientist"	Sungha Jung Cover Compilation 2	
Sungha Jung	South Korea	2019	"Viva la Vida"	Sungha Jung Cover Compilation 4	
K's Choice	Belgium	2008	"Yellow"	Rendez Vous: 25 Unieke Covers Uit 25 Jaar Studio Brussel	
Sofia Karlberg	Sweden	2016	"Viva la Vida"	Alternatives (Acoustic Version)	
Simon Keizer	Netherlands	2009	"Viva la Vida"	De Beste Zangers Van Nederland †	
Tay Kewei	Singapore	2010	"The Scientist"	Come Closer with... Kewei	
Alicia Keys	United States	2012	"Clocks"	iHeart Radio †	
Kidz Bop Kids	United States	2006	"Speed of Sound"	Kidz Bop 9	
Kidz Bop Kids	United States	2017	"Something Just Like This"	Kidz Bop 35	
King Stingray	Australia	2022	"Yellow"	Like a Version †	
Myleene Klass	England	2004	"Trouble"	Moving On (Special 2004 Edition)	
Solange Knowles	United States	2009	"Viva la Vida"	Non-album single (Yahoo! Music exclusive)	
The Kooks	England	2008	"Violet Hill"	Live Lounge †	
Avril Lavigne	Canada	2007	"The Scientist"	Live Lounge †	
Kodi Lee	United States	2023	"Fix You"	Published on Instagram †	
Kodi Lee	United States	2023	"Yellow"	Published on Instagram †	
Lennon & Maisy	Canada	2017	"Up&Up"	Non-album single	
Lewisham and Greenwich NHS Choir	England	2013	"Fix You" (Note: Mashup with "Bridge over Troubled Water" by Simon & Garfunkel.)	Something Inside So Strong	
Lizzo	United States	2023	"Yellow"	Glastonbury Festival †	
Tre Lux	United States	2006	"Yellow"	A Strange Gathering	
Lyra	Ireland	2024	"Viva la Vida" (Note: Mashup with "Black Is the Colour" by Christy Moore.)	Live at the Marquee †	
Mabel	England · Sweden	2018	"Fix You"	Live Lounge †	
Anmol Malik	India	2015	"Paradise" (Note: Released as "Lamhein".)	Non-album single	
Aimee Mann	United States	2002	"The Scientist"	Lost in Space	
Chris Mann	United States	2012	"Viva la Vida"	The Voice †	
Flora Martínez	Colombia	2016	"The Scientist"	Flora	
Matt McAndrew	United States	2014	"Fix You"	The Voice †	
Michael McDonald	United States	2003	"The Scientist" (Note: Released as "The Narcissist".)	Mad TV †	
Jai McDowall	Scotland	2011	"Fix You"	Believe	
Damian McGinty	Ireland	2012	"Yellow"	Damian McGinty	
Shawn Mendes	Canada	2019	"Fix You"	Shawn Mendes: The Tour †	
Military Wives	England	2012	"Fix You"	In My Dreams	
Kylie Minogue	Australia	2015	"Christmas Lights"	Kylie Christmas: Snow Queen Edition	
Modestep	England	2011	"Paradise"	Live Lounge †	
Monsieur Periné	Colombia	2021	"Viva la Vida"	ReImagined at Home †	
Sam Moran	Australia	2010	"The Scientist"	Colour of Love	
Mark Murphy	United States	2007	"What If"	Love Is What Stays	
Kacey Musgraves	United States	2021	"Fix You"	Non-album single	
Laura Mvula	England	2014	"Yellow"	Live Lounge †	
Johnette Napolitano · Danny Lohner	United States	2004	"The Scientist"	Wicker Park: Original Motion Picture Soundtrack	
Naturally 7	United States	2015	"Fix You"	Hidden in Plain Sight	
Willie Nelson	United States	2012	"The Scientist"	Heroes	
Noah and the Whale	England	2011	"Paradise"	Live Lounge †	
Nothing	United States	2024	"Yellow"	Sound and Fury Festival †	
One Direction	England · Ireland	2010	"Viva la Vida"	The X Factor †	
One Voice Children's Choir	United States	2017	"Something Just Like This"	Non-album single	
One Voice Children's Choir	United States	2018	"Adventure of a Lifetime"	Non-album single	
One Voice Children's Choir	United States	2022	"Fix You"	Non-album single	
Rita Ora	England	2014	"Magic" (Note: Mashup with "Drunk in Love" by Beyoncé.)	BBC Radio 1's Big Weekend †	
Out of the Blue	United States	2009	"Fix You"	Getting Wise	
Craig Owens	United States	2012	"Paradise"	Punk Goes Pop, Vol. 5	
Bela Padilla	Philippines	2018	"Fix You"	Non-album single	
Ronan Parke	England	2011	"Fix You"	Ronan Parke	
Obadiah Parker	England	2008	"Trouble"	The Tip Jar, Vol. 1	
Alex Parks	England	2003	"Yellow"	Introduction	
Tanner Patrick	United States	2012	"Paradise"	Non-album single	
Pendulum	Australia	2008	"Violet Hill"	Live Lounge †	
Caroline Pennell	United States	2015	"Yellow"	From Cover to Cover: 30 Years at Nettwerk	
Pet Shop Boys	England	2009	"Viva la Vida" (Note: Mashup with "Domino Dancing" by Pet Shop Boys.)	Christmas	
Maisie Peters	England	2025	"Christmas Lights"	Live Lounge †	
The Piano Guys · Alex Boyé	United States	2012	"Paradise" (Note: Released as "Peponi", which translates to "Paradise".)	The Piano Guys	
The Piano Guys	United States	2016	"A Sky Full of Stars"	Uncharted	
The Piano Guys	United States	2018	"Something Just Like This"	Limitless	
Mike Posner	United States	2011	"The Scientist" (Note: Released as "Nobody Said It Was Easy".)	The Layover	
Postmodern Jukebox	United States	2015	"Viva la Vida"	Top Hat on Fleek	
Corinne Bailey Rae	England	2017	"The Scientist"	Fifty Shades Darker: Original Motion Picture Soundtrack	
Dean Ray	Australia	2014	"Yellow"	The X Factor †	
Red Hot Chilli Pipers	Scotland	2013	"Fix You"	Breathe	
Shaun Reynolds	England	2015	"Adventure of a Lifetime"	Non-album single	
Rhythms del Mundo	Cuba	2006	"Clocks"	Rhythms del Mundo: Cuba	
Richard Cheese	United States	2004	"Yellow"	I'd Like a Virgin	
Richard Cheese	United States	2009	"Viva la Vida"	Viva la Vodka: Richard Cheese Live	
Rivermaya	Philippines	2003	"Shiver"	Live and Acoustic	
Chappell Roan	United States	2020	"The Scientist"	Non-album single (YouTube exclusive)	
Robyn	Sweden	2011	"Every Teardrop Is a Waterfall"	Live Lounge †	
Rock Choir	England	2024	"Fix You"	Non-album single	
Mark Ronson	England	2007	"God Put a Smile upon Your Face"	Version	
Rosé	South Korea	2022	"Viva la Vida"	Non-album single (YouTube exclusive)	
Royal Blood	England	2015	"Clocks"	Published on Instagram †	
Royal Liverpool Philharmonic	England	2017	"Fix You"	Pop Goes Classical	
Kate Rusby	England	2020	"Everglow"	Hand Me Down	
Sabrina	Philippines	2014	"Magic"	I Love Acoustic 7	
Sabrina	Philippines	2017	"Hymn for the Weekend"	I Love Acoustic 10.1	
Sabrina	Philippines	2017	"Something Just Like This"	I Love Acoustic 10.1	
Rhap Salazar	Philippines	2018	"Fix You"	Rhap: Acoustic Covers	
Scala & Kolacny Brothers	Belgium	2006	"Yellow"	It All Leads to This	
Scala & Kolacny Brothers	Belgium	2010	"Viva la Vida"	Circle	
Michael Schulte	Germany	2011	"Clocks"	Acoustic Cover, Vol. 1	
Michael Schulte	Germany	2011	"Talk"	Acoustic Cover, Vol. 1	
Michael Schulte	Germany	2011	"Yellow"	Acoustic Cover, Vol. 1	
Michael Schulte	Germany	2011	"Every Teardrop Is a Waterfall"	Acoustic Cover, Vol. 2	
Michael Schulte	Germany	2012	"Fix You"	Acoustic Cover, Vol. 3	
Secondhand Serenade	United States	2009	"Fix You"	A Twist in My Story (Deluxe Edition)	
Amy Shark	Australia	2022	"Christmas Lights"	Non-album single	
Ed Sheeran	England	2017	"Yellow"	The Howard Stern Show †	
The Shirehorses	England	2001	"Yellow" (Note: Released as "Bellow".)	Our Kid Eh	
Sitti	Philippines	2014	"Yellow"	Bossa Love	
Sam Smith	England	2020	"Fix You"	Love Goes (Japanese Edition)	
Ryan Star	United States	2006	"Clocks"	Rock Star: Supernova †	
Ayra Starr	Nigeria	2025	"Strawberry Swing"	Global Citizen Festival †	
Stereo Kicks	England	2015	"Fix You"	Non-album single (YouTube exclusive)	
Straight No Chaser	United States	2010	"Fix You"	With a Twist	
Straight No Chaser	United States	2016	"Christmas Lights"	I'll Have Another... Christmas Album	
Ian Sweet	United States	2021	"Yellow"	Non-album single	
Taylor Swift	United States	2010	"Viva la Vida"	Great British Songbook †	
Diane Tell	Canada	2005	"The Scientist" (Note: Released as "Reprenons du Départ".)	Popeline	
Jasmine Thompson	England	2014	"Magic"	Non-album single	
Mike Tompkins	Canada	2011	"Paradise"	Non-album single	
Mike Tompkins	Canada	2015	"Adventure of a Lifetime"	Non-album single	
Kristina Train	United States	2013	"Sparks"	I Give It a Year: Original Motion Picture Soundtrack	
Meghan Trainor	United States	2020	"Cry Cry Cry"	Together at Home †	
Hannah Trigwell	England	2014	"A Sky Full of Stars"	Cover Sessions, Vol. 3	
Tufts Beelzebubs	United States	2005	"Trouble"	Shedding	
Twelve Girls Band	China	2004	"Clocks"	Eastern Energy	
Carrie Underwood	United States	2012	"Fix You"	VH1 Unplugged †	
Valley	Canada	2023	"Christmas Lights"	Non-album single	
Vitamin String Quartet	United States	2014	"A Sky Full of Stars"	VSQ Performs the Hits of 2014, Vol. 2	
Vox Angeli	France	2008	"The Scientist"	Vox Angeli	
Jai Waetford	Australia	2013	"Fix You"	Jai Waetford EP	
Tyler Ward	United States	2012	"Paradise"	What They Wrote	
Tyler Ward	United States	2013	"The Scientist"	Tyler Ward Covers, Vol. 5	
Weezer	United States	2010	"Viva la Vida"	Hurley (Deluxe Edition)	
Westlife	Ireland	2011	"Viva la Vida"	Gravity Tour †	
Jodie Whittaker	England	2019	"Yellow"	BBC Children in Need: Got It Covered	
Hayley Williams	United States	2020	"Green Eyes"	Published on Instagram †	
Wisp	United States	2025	"Yellow"	Non-album single	
Faith Yang	Taiwan	2009	"The Scientist"	Self-Selected	
"Weird Al" Yankovic	United States	2006	"Speed of Sound" (Note: Released as part of "Polkarama!", a medley with various other songs.)	Straight Outta Lynwood	
Yeji	South Korea	2023	"My Universe"	The Seasons: Choi Jung Hoon's Night Park	
Yellowcard	United States	2012	"Fix You"	Southern Air	
Yellowcard	United States	2013	"Christmas Lights"	Punk Goes Christmas	
You Me at Six	England	2014	"Magic"	Live Lounge †	
Young@Heart Chorus	United States	2008	"Fix You"	Mostly Live	
Zucchero	Italy	2021	"The Scientist"	Discover	

== See also ==
- Coldplay discography
- List of songs by Coldplay
- Coldplay videography
