= List of songs by Coldplay =

Songs by British band

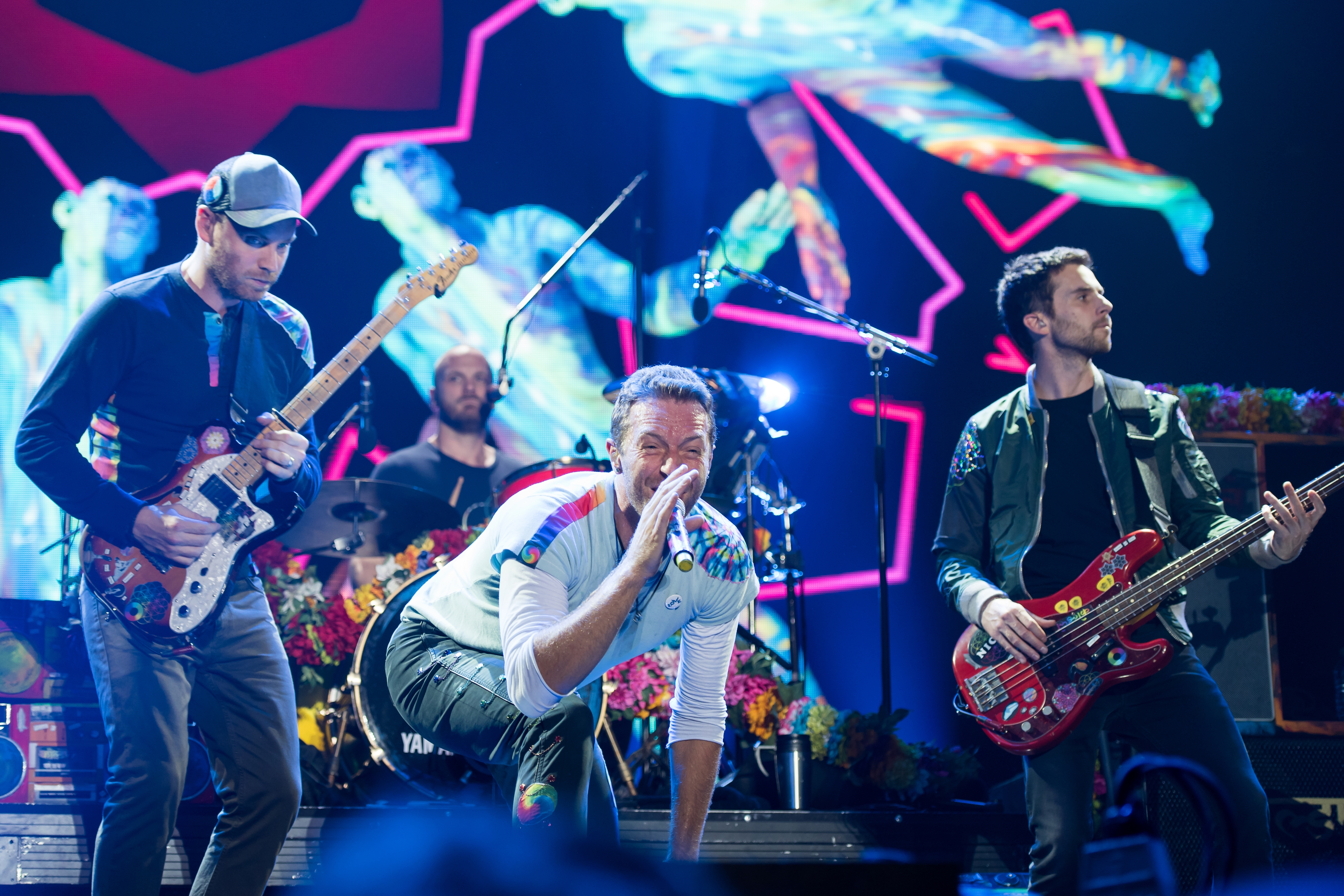
Coldplay at the Barclays Arena in 2017

British rock band Coldplay have written or co-written every song in their discography, with the exception of several covers. They were formed in London by Chris Martin (vocals, piano), Jonny Buckland (lead guitar), Guy Berryman (bass guitar), Will Champion (drums, percussion) and Phil Harvey (management). Aside from the latter, all members are equally credited as songwriters on each track. Their experimentation with styles over the years resulted in a sound that is considered alternative rock, alternative pop, pop rock, post-Britpop, soft rock, and pop. Conversely, extended plays Safety (1998) and The Blue Room (1999) featured characteristics of the dream pop genre, setting them apart from succeeding works.

According to Berryman, debut album Parachutes (2000) was a muted record. It combined beautiful and happy messages with moody and atmospheric tones. Made available two years later, A Rush of Blood to the Head (2002) boasted stronger piano and guitar melodies, helping to address the urgency and turmoil caused by the September 11 attacks. The band held onto their previous references for X&Y (2005), but with the addition of electronic production and extensive use of synthesisers. Existential themes were grander in scale to match the arrangements as well.

Its successor, Viva la Vida or Death and All His Friends (2008), entailed contributions from Brian Eno, helping Coldplay to explore a new musical territory. They experimented with numerous instruments, such as electric violins, tack pianos, santoors, and organs. Lyrically, the album discussed life, love, death, revolution, war, and politics. In 2011, the group launched Mylo Xyloto, a concept record following the story of two characters in the style of a rock opera. It widened their soundscapes by incorporating modern, urban, and dance compositions, as seen with Rihanna collaboration "Princess of China". Three years later, they drew influence from genres like R&B, synth-pop, and ambient to release Ghost Stories (2014). Martin described the album as a journey towards unconditional love, while Avicii and Paul Epworth handled guest production.

Coldplay subsequently invited Stargate to record the disco and funk-inspired A Head Full of Dreams (2015), which contemplated forgiveness, parenthood, and healing. Various acts had a cameo appearance, including Beyoncé in "Hymn for the Weekend", Tove Lo in "Fun", and Noel Gallagher in "Up&Up". Additionally, the band tried out EDM sounds by partnering with the Chainsmokers for "Something Just Like This" in 2017. Regarded as their most political and experimental work to date, Everyday Life (2019) saw them move towards jazz, gospel, blues, and classical rhythms. Coldplay maintained this multi-genre approach for Music of the Spheres (2021), but adding pop sensibilities. They enlisted Max Martin to produce the album and picked topics based on the human experience for its lyrics. Collaborations also involved BTS in "My Universe". Aside from usual activities, the band take part in tribute projects, film soundtracks, and songwriting sessions from other musicians. Similarly, unreleased material has been performed at many shows.

== Released songs ==
Key
†	Indicates song not written or co-written by Coldplay

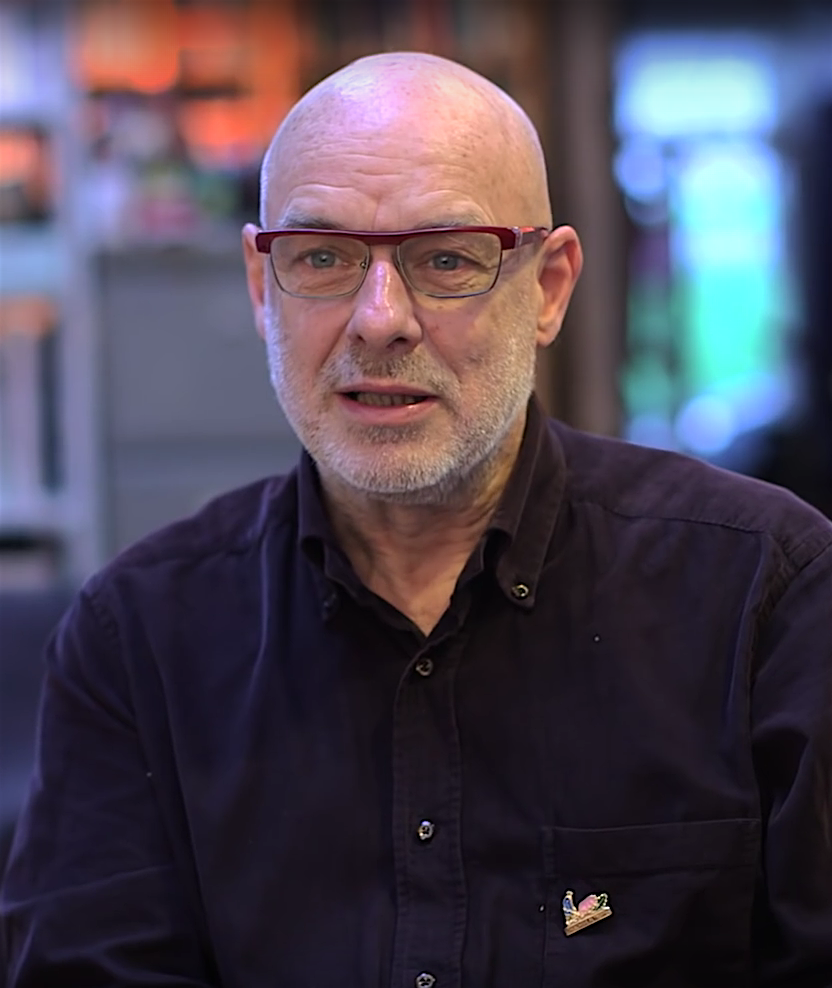
Brian Eno (pictured in 2015) contributed to Viva la Vida or Death and All His Friends and Mylo Xyloto.

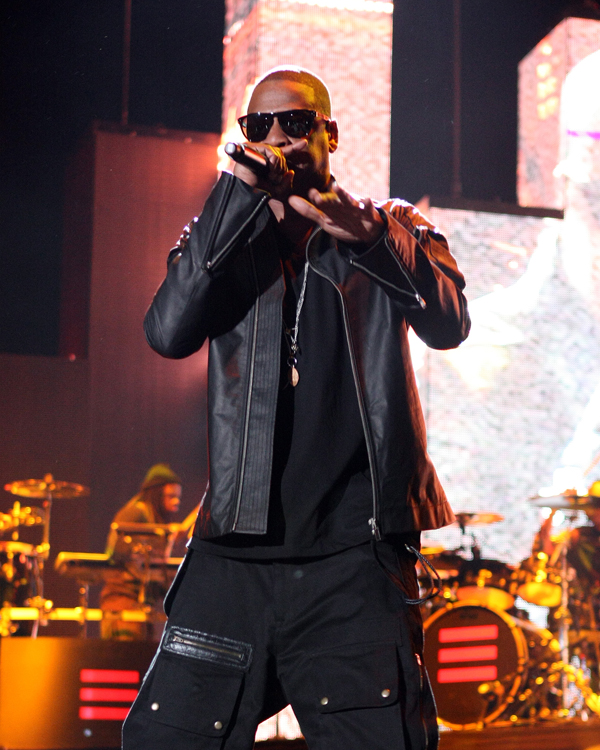
Jay-Z (pictured in 2010) appeared on "Lost+", the remix version of "Lost!".

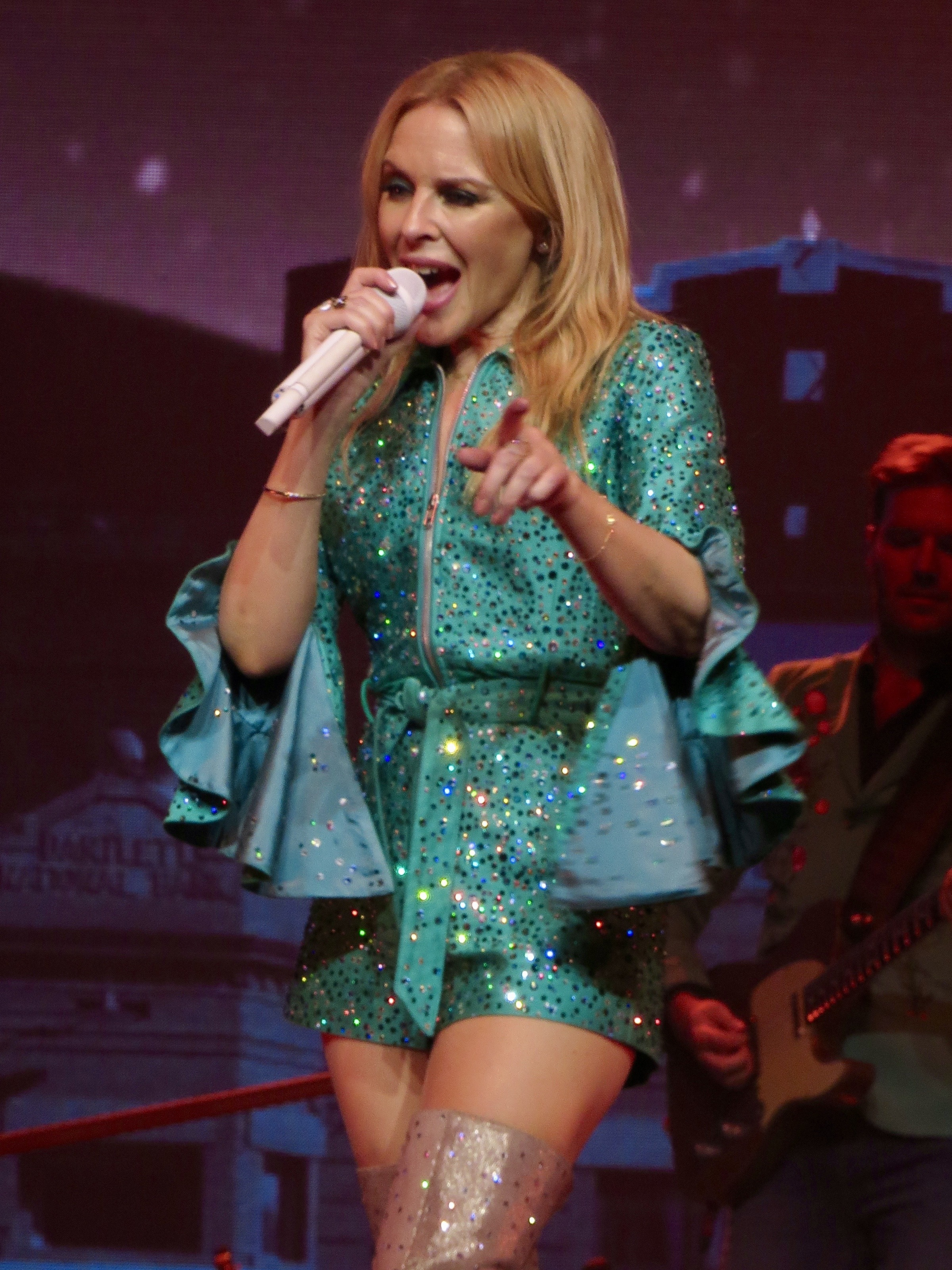
Kylie Minogue (pictured in 2018) worked with Coldplay on the single "Lhuna".

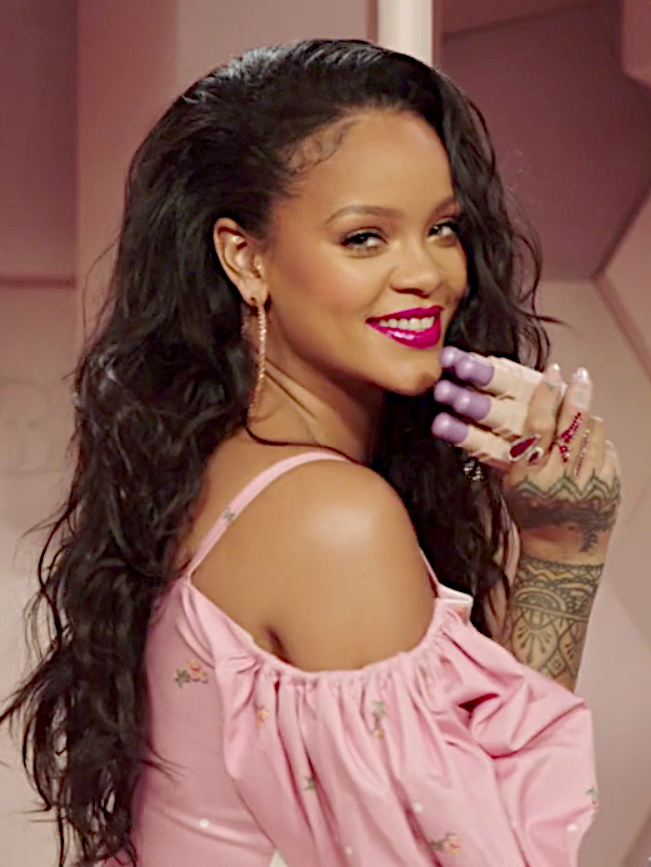
Rihanna (pictured in 2018) collaborated with Coldplay on "Princess of China".

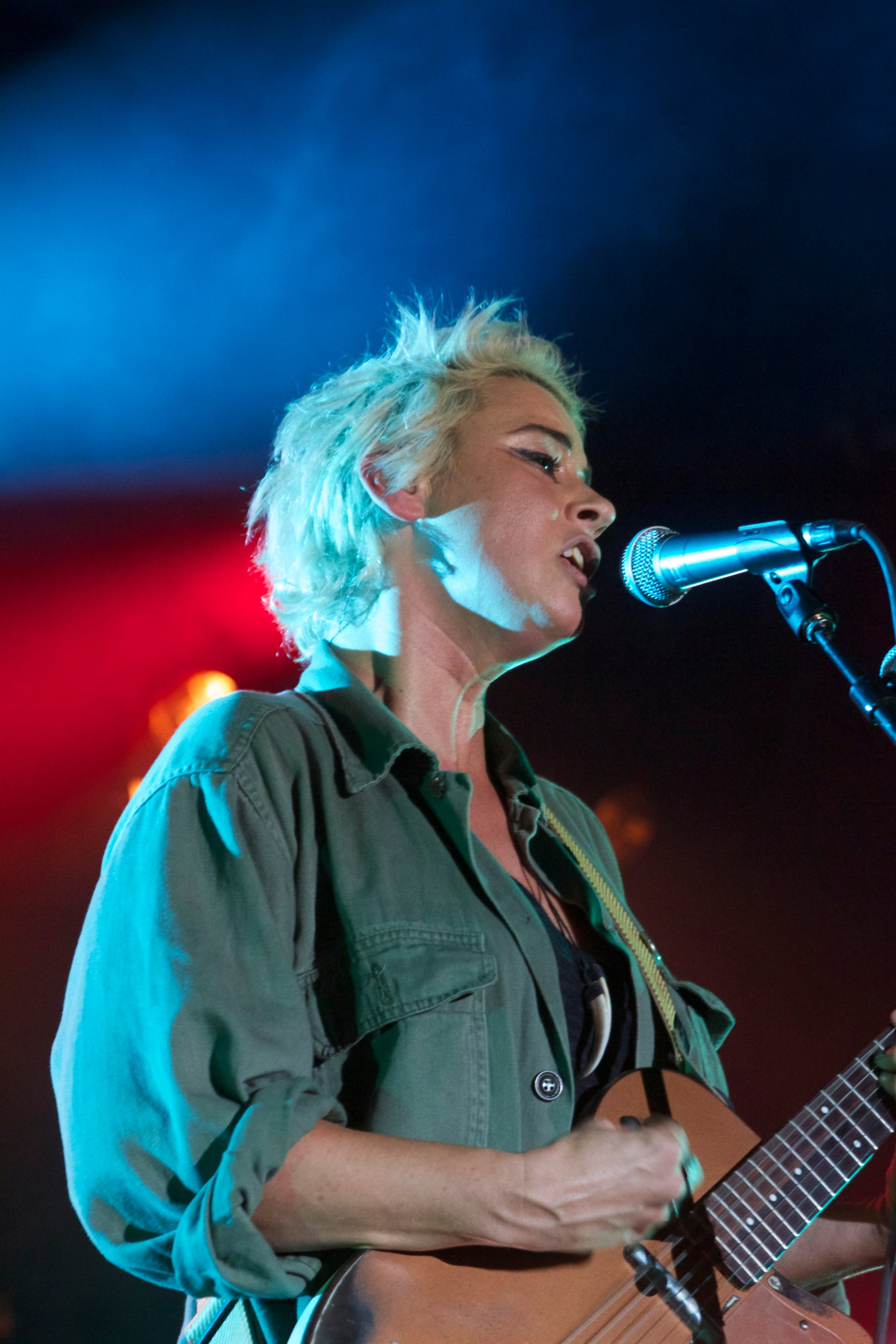
Cat Power (pictured in 2018) and Coldplay teamed up for the title track of the film Wish I Was Here (2014).

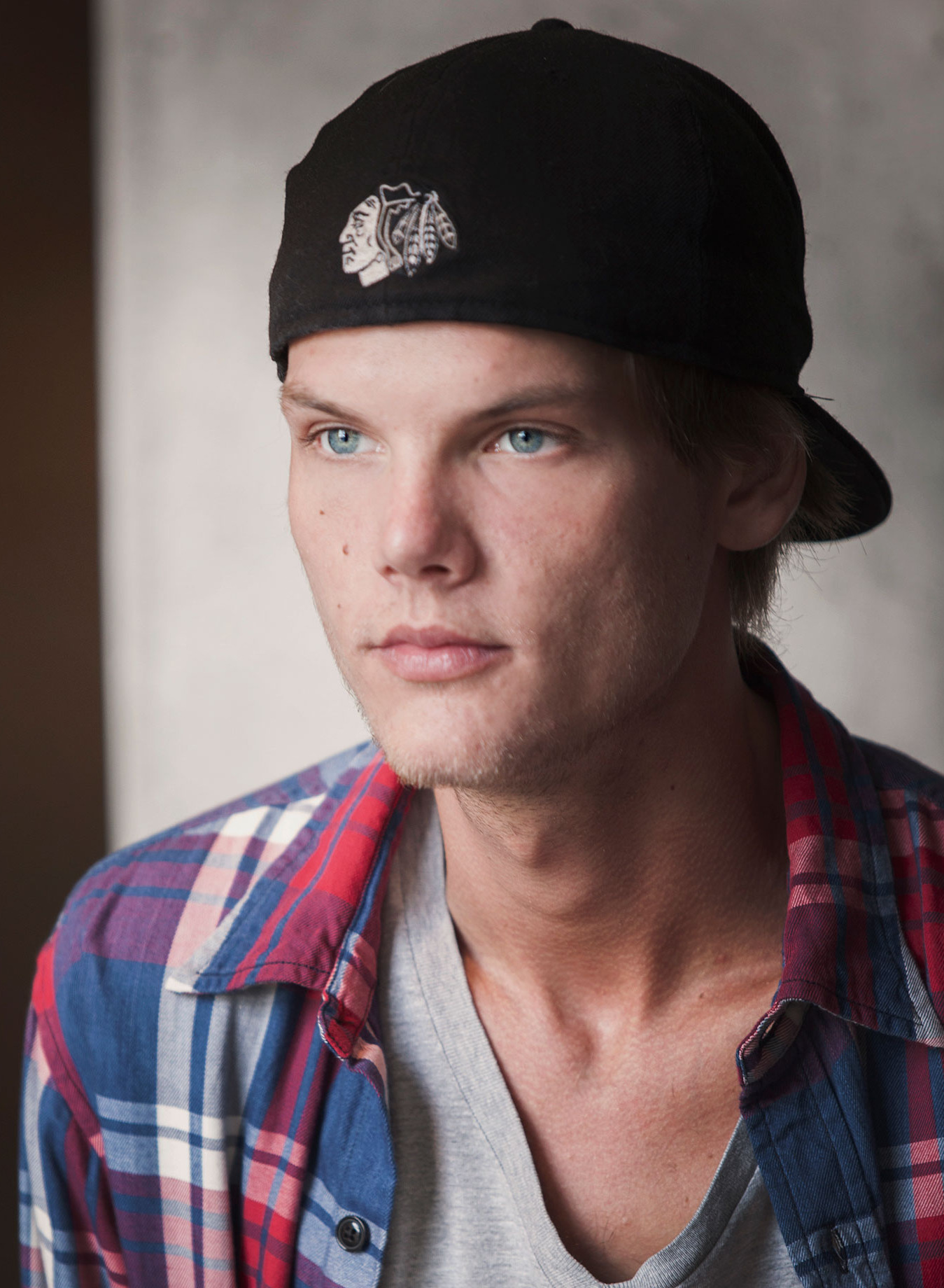
Avicii (pictured in 2014) co-wrote and co-produced the single "A Sky Full of Stars".

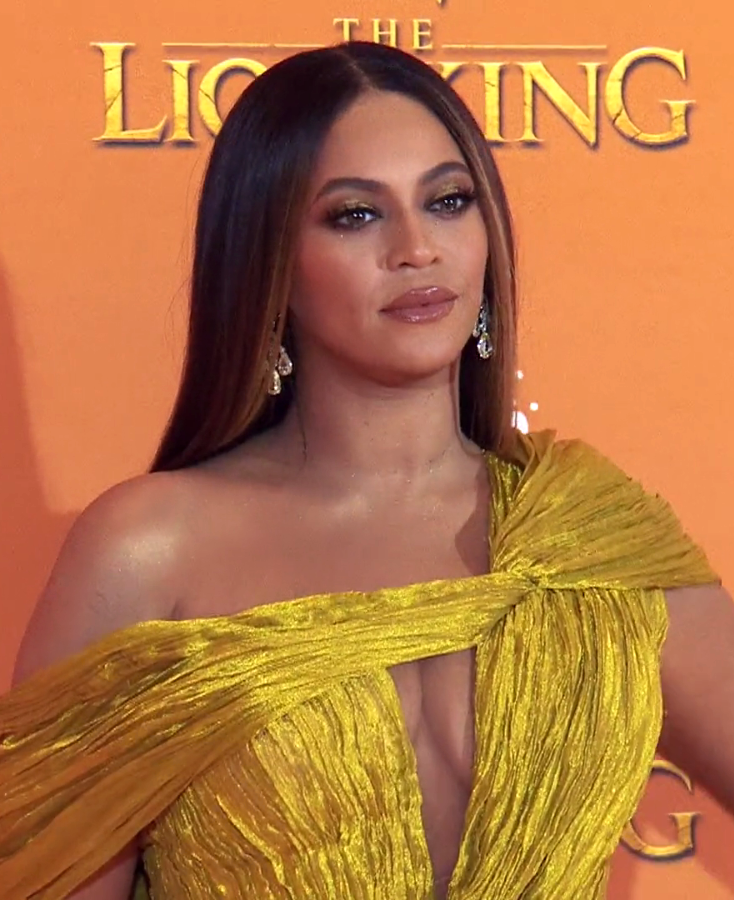
Beyoncé (pictured in 2019) has uncredited vocals on the songs "Hymn for the Weekend" and "Up&Up".

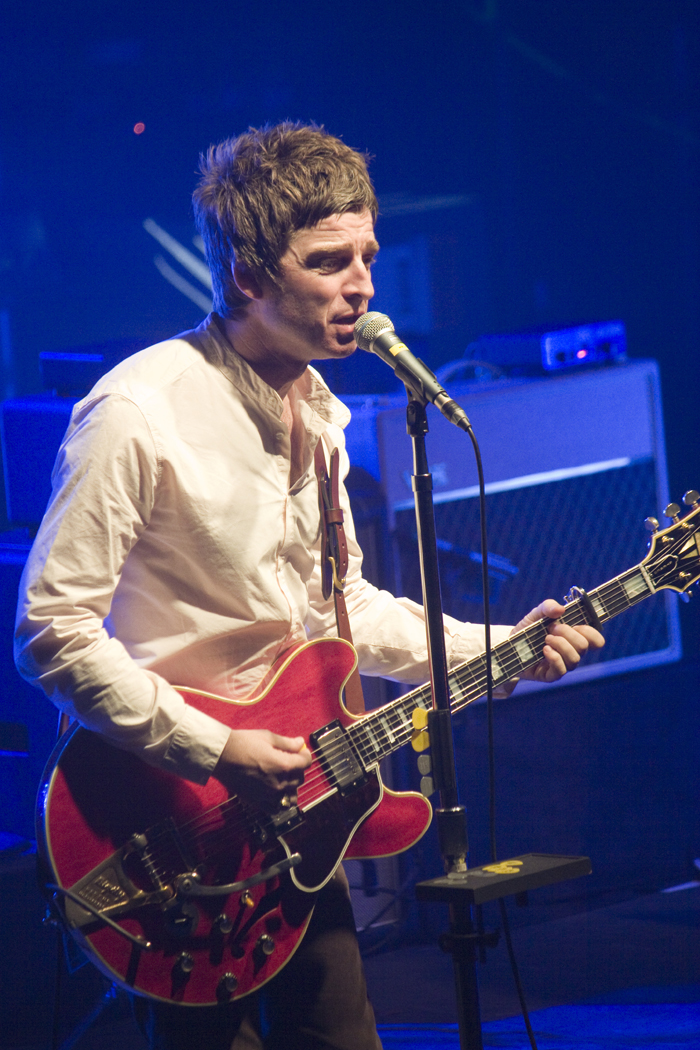
Noel Gallagher (pictured in 2012) performed the guitar solo on "Up&Up".

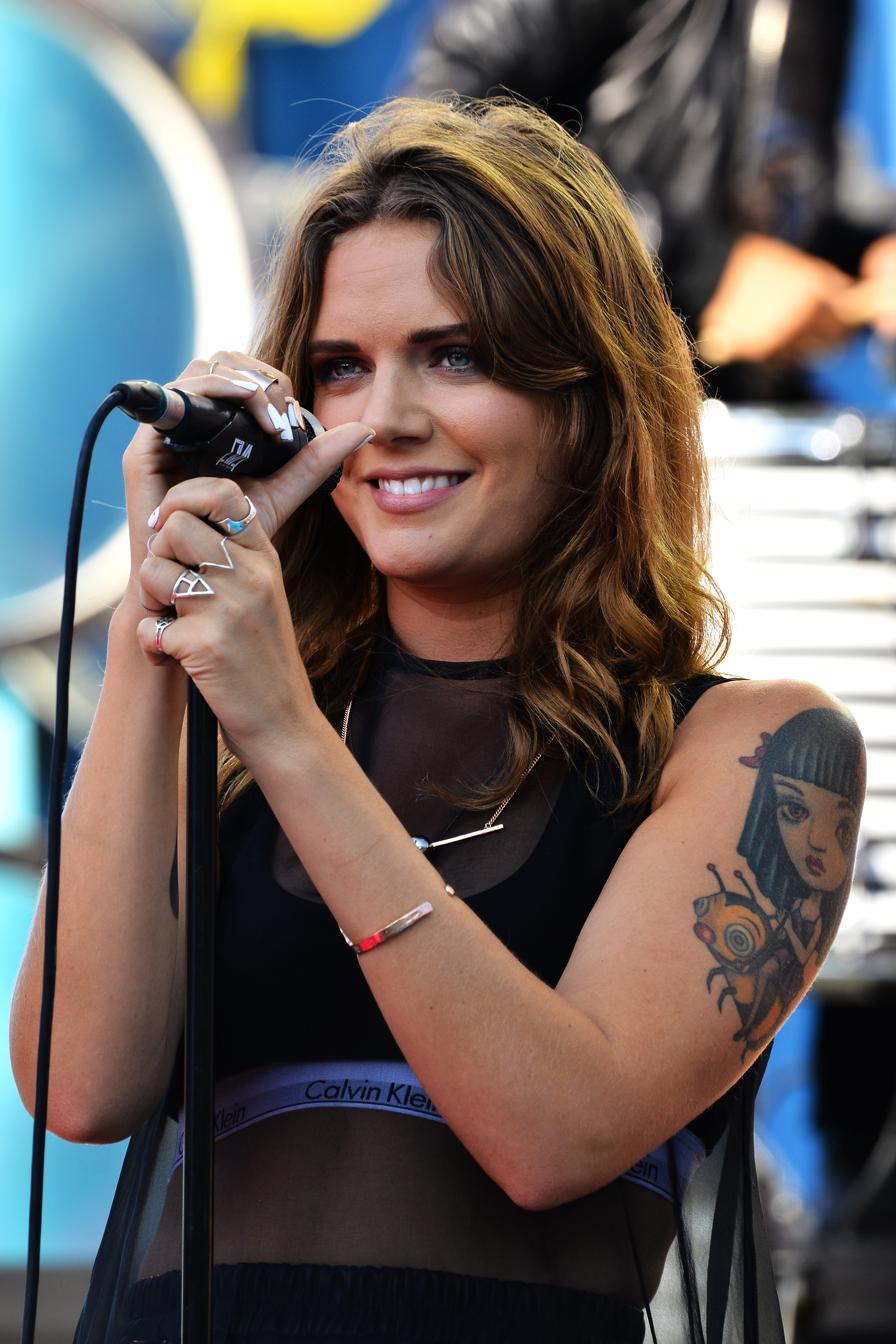
Tove Lo (pictured in 2014) made a guest appearance on the song "Fun".

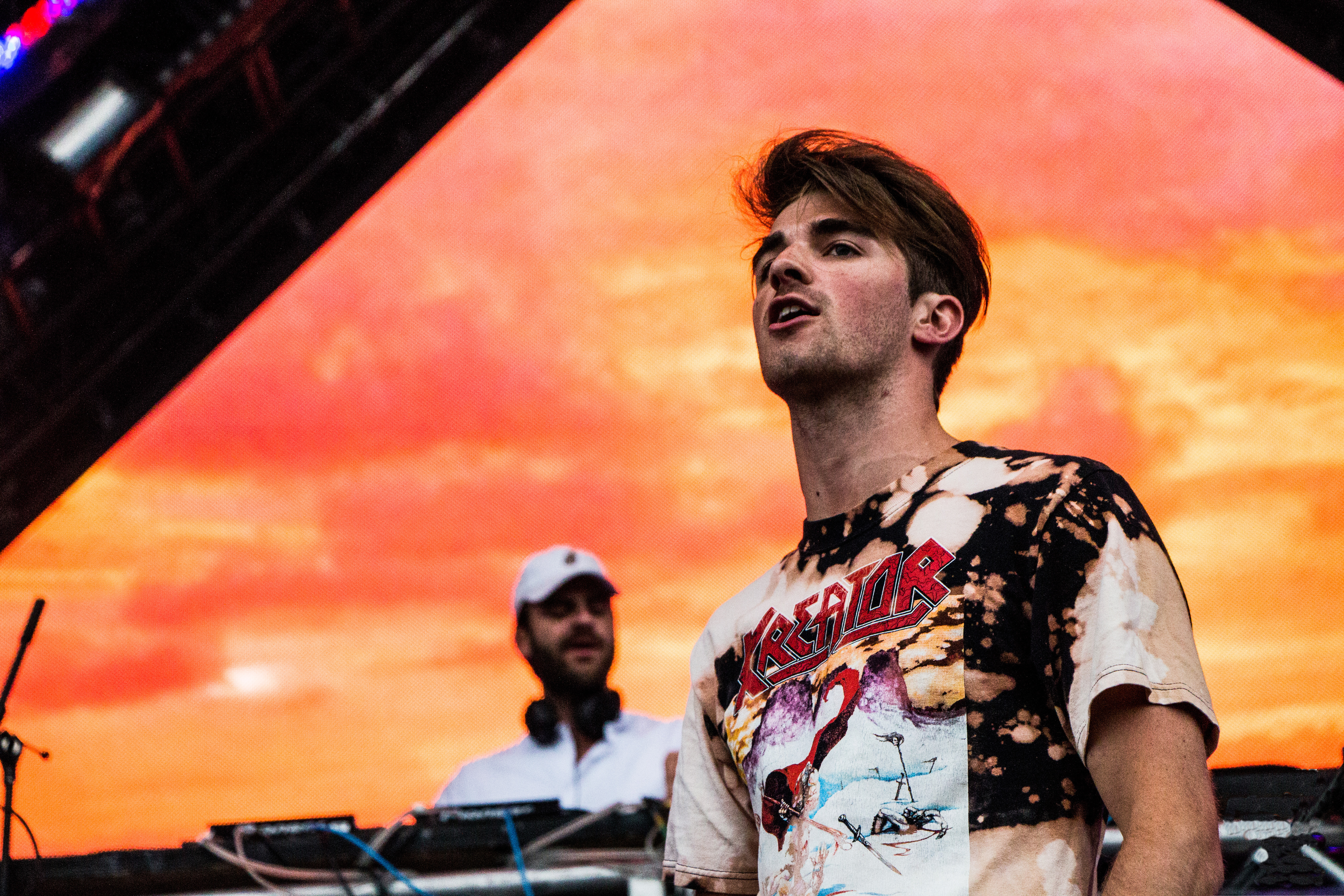
The Chainsmokers (pictured in 2016) released the single "Something Just Like This" with Coldplay.

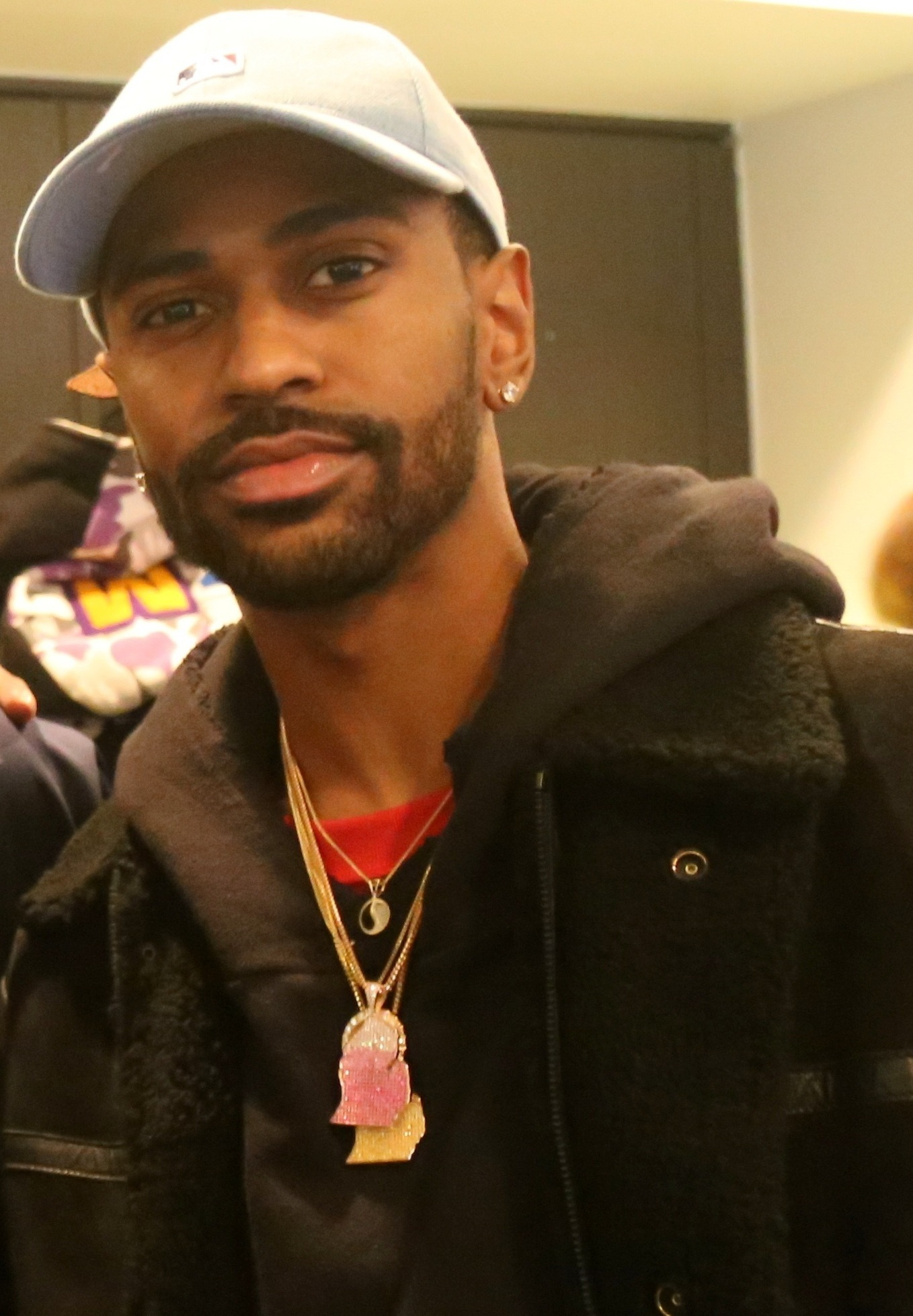
Big Sean (pictured in 2016) raps on "Miracles (Someone Special)".

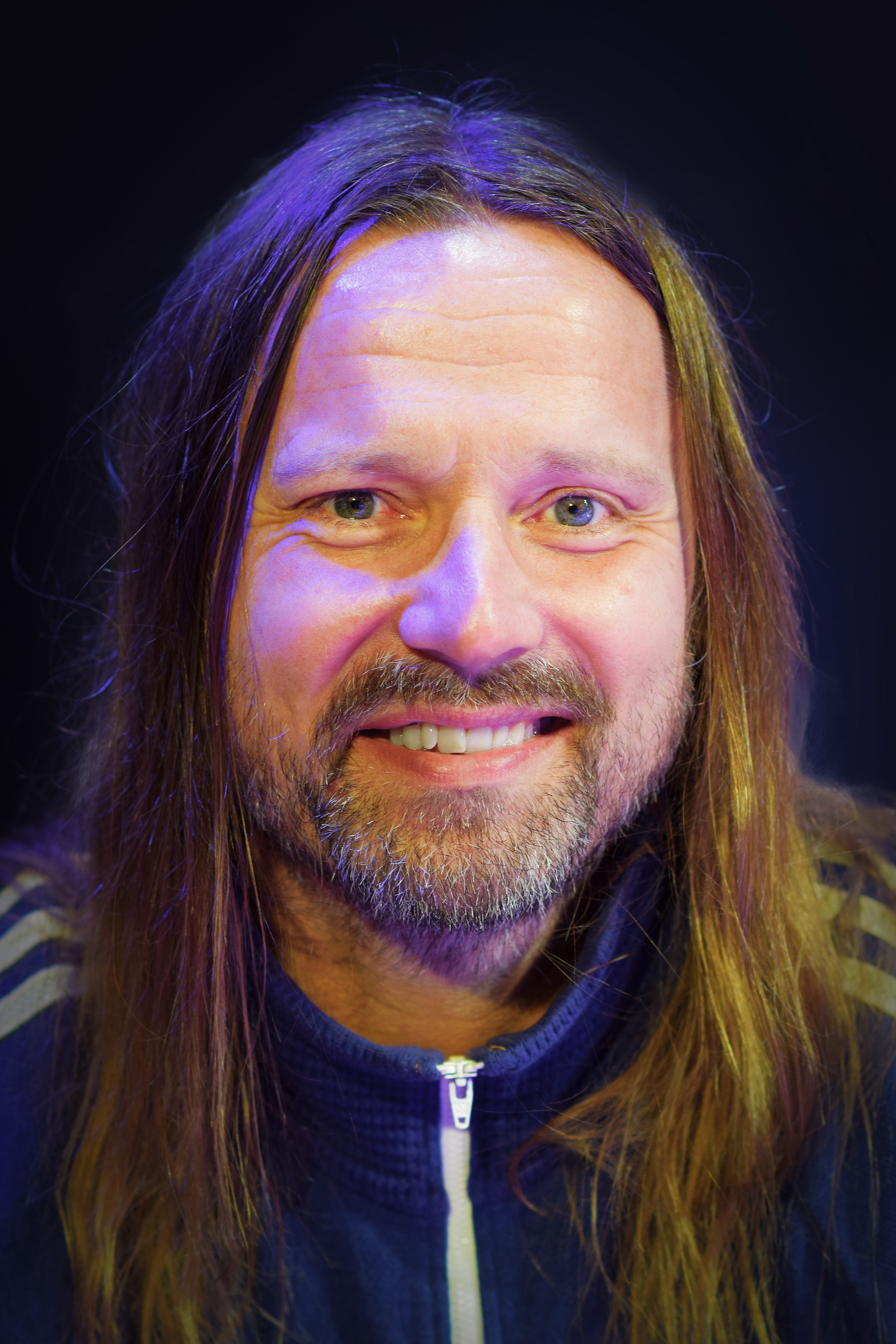
Max Martin (pictured in 2023) produced Music of the Spheres and Moon Music.

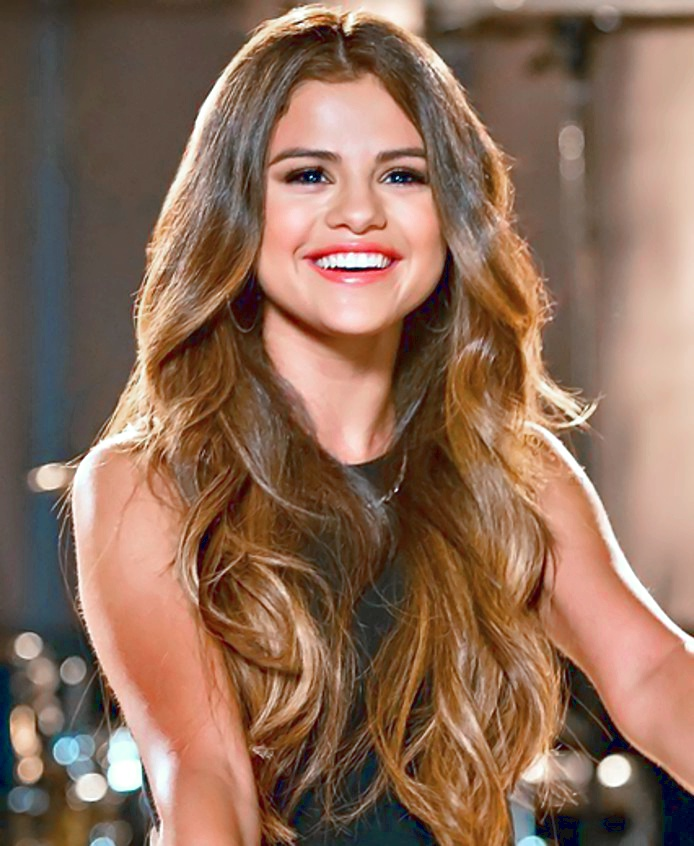
Selena Gomez (pictured in 2013) recorded guest vocals on "Let Somebody Go".

List of released songs
Title	Writers	Original release	Year	Ref.
"1.36"	Coldplay	B-side of "The Scientist"	2002	
"42"	Coldplay	Viva la Vida or Death and All His Friends	2008	
"2000 Miles" (The Pretenders cover)	Chrissie Hynde †	Sweet Tracks	2003	
"Adventure of a Lifetime"	Coldplay; Stargate	A Head Full of Dreams	2015	
"Aeterna"	Coldplay; Louis Cole; Daniel Green; Jon Hopkins; José Velazquez	Moon Music	2024	
"Alien Choir" (stylised as "")	Coldplay; Max Martin; Jon Hopkins	Music of the Spheres	2021	
"Alien Hits / Alien Radio" (stylised as "")	Coldplay; Jon Hopkins; Devin Powers; Maya Angelou; Kaori Muraji	Moon Music	2024	
"Aliens"	Coldplay; Brian Eno	Kaleidoscope EP	2017	
"All I Can Think About Is You"	Coldplay	Kaleidoscope EP	2017	
"All My Love" (Note: A live version appears on the Full Moon edition of Moon Music (2024).)	Coldplay; Moses Martin	Moon Music	2024	
"All Your Friends" (Note: Also appears on the Target edition of Ghost Stories (2014).)	Coldplay	A Sky Full of Stars	2014	
"Always in My Head"	Coldplay	Ghost Stories	2014	
"Amazing Day"	Coldplay; Stargate	A Head Full of Dreams	2015	
"Amor Argentina" (Live)	Coldplay	Live in Buenos Aires	2018	
"Amsterdam"	Coldplay	A Rush of Blood to the Head	2002	
"Angelsong"	Coldplay; Devin Powers; Maya Angelou; Jon Hopkins	Moon Music (Full Moon edition)	2024	
"Animals"	Coldplay	B-side of "Clocks"	2003	
"Another's Arms"	Coldplay	Ghost Stories	2014	
"Arabesque"	Coldplay; Femi Kuti; Drew Goddard; Paul Van Haver	Everyday Life	2019	
"Army of One"	Coldplay; Stargate	A Head Full of Dreams	2015	
"The Astronaut" (Jin)	Coldplay; Kim Seok-Jin; Kyrre Gørvell-Dahll; Joan La Barbara; Jóhann Jóhannsson; Moses Martin	Non-album single	2022	
"Atlas"	Coldplay	The Hunger Games: Catching Fire	2013	
"بنی آدم" (Note: Written as "Bani Adam" in Latin script, the song's title refers to a poem by Saadi Shirazi and is translated to "Children of Adam" literally or "Human Beings" within context.)	Coldplay; Alice Coltrane; Harcourt Whyte	Everyday Life	2019	
"Bigger Stronger" (Note: Also appears on The Blue Room (1999).)	Coldplay	Safety	1998	
"Birds" (Note: A live version appears on the album Stand as One – Live at Glastonbury (2016).)	Coldplay; Stargate	A Head Full of Dreams	2015	
"Bitter Sweet Symphony" (The Verve live cover) (with Richard Ashcroft)	Richard Ashcroft †	Live 8	2005	
"Biutyful"	Coldplay; Davide Rossi; Max Martin; Oscar Holter	Music of the Spheres	2021	
"Broken"	Coldplay	Everyday Life	2019	
"Brothers & Sisters" (Note: A re-recording appears as a B-side of "Trouble".)	Coldplay	Non-album single	1999	
"Careful Where You Stand"	Coldplay	B-side of "Shiver"	2000	
"Cemeteries of London"	Coldplay	Viva la Vida or Death and All His Friends	2008	
"Champion of the World"	Coldplay; Andy Monaghan; Scott Hutchison; Simon Lidell	Everyday Life	2019	
"Charlie Brown"	Coldplay; Brian Eno	Mylo Xyloto	2011	
"Chinese Sleep Chant" (Hidden track)	Coldplay	Viva la Vida or Death and All His Friends	2008	
"Christmas Lights"	Coldplay	Non-album single	2010	
"Church"	Coldplay; Amjad Sabri; Davide Rosse; Stargate; Jacob Collier; Norah Shaqur	Everyday Life	2019	
"Clocks" (Note: A remix appears on the album Rhythms del Mundo (2006).)	Coldplay	A Rush of Blood to the Head	2002	
"Coloratura"	Coldplay; Max Martin; Paris Strother; John Metcalfe; Davide Rossi	Music of the Spheres	2021	
"Colour Spectrum"	Coldplay; Stargate	A Head Full of Dreams	2015	
"Crests of Waves"	Coldplay	B-side of "Clocks"	2003	
"Cry Cry Cry"	Coldplay; Bert Berns; Jerry Ragovoy; Jacob Collier	Everyday Life	2019	
"Daddy"	Coldplay	Everyday Life	2019	
"Day 'n' Nite" (Kid Cudi live cover)	Scott Mescudi; Oladipo Omishore †	Spotify Singles	2022	
"Daylight"	Coldplay	A Rush of Blood to the Head	2002	
"De Música Ligera" (Soda Stereo live cover)	Gustavo Cerati; Zeta Bosio †	Live in Buenos Aires	2018	
"Death and All His Friends"	Coldplay	Viva la Vida or Death and All His Friends	2008	
"Death Will Never Conquer"	Coldplay	B-side of "Viva la Vida"	2008	
"Don't Let It Break Your Heart"	Coldplay; Brian Eno	Mylo Xyloto	2011	
"Don't Panic" (Note: A re-recording appears on Parachutes (2000).)	Coldplay	The Blue Room	1999	
"Don't Wanna Cry" (Seventeen)	Coldplay; Hansol Chwe; Kwon Soon-Young; Kye Beom-ju; Lee Ji-Hoon; Andrew Taggart; Yoon Jeong-Han	Al1	2017	
"E-Lo" (as Los Unidades) (featuring Jozzy and Pharrell Williams)	Coldplay; Jocelyn Donaldson; Letta Mbulu	Global Citizen – EP 1	2018	
"Easy to Please"	Coldplay	B-side of "Brothers & Sisters"	1999	
"Èkó"	Coldplay	Everyday Life	2019	
"End Credits" (Live)	Coldplay	Live in Buenos Aires	2018	
"The Escapist" (Hidden track)	Coldplay; Jon Hopkins	Viva la Vida or Death and All His Friends	2008	
"Everglow"	Coldplay; Stargate	A Head Full of Dreams	2015	
"Every Teardrop Is a Waterfall" (Note: A remix subtitled "Coldplay vs. Swedish House Mafia" appears on the album Until Now (2012).)	Coldplay; Brian Eno; Peter Allen; Adrienne Anderson; Harry Castioni; Alex Christensen; Bela Lagonda; Jeff Wycombe	Mylo Xyloto	2011	
"Everyday Life"	Coldplay; John Metcalfe	Everyday Life	2019	
"Everything's Not Lost"	Coldplay	Parachutes	2000	
"Feelslikeimfallinginlove" (Note: A live version titled "Feelslikeimfallinginlive" appears on the Full Moon edition of Moon Music (2024).)	Coldplay; Jon Hopkins; Max Martin; Oscar Holter; Apple Martin; Tim Rutili	Moon Music	2024	
"Fix You" (Note: A live version appears on the albums Live 8 (2005) and Hurricane Relief: Come Together Now (2007).)	Coldplay	X&Y	2005	
"Flags"	Coldplay	Everyday Life (Japanese edition)	2019	
"Fly On" (Hidden track)	Coldplay	Ghost Stories	2014	
"For You"	Coldplay	B-side of "Shiver"	2000	
"Fun" (Natalie Imbruglia)	Coldplay	Come to Life	2009	
"Fun" (featuring Tove Lo)	Coldplay; Stargate	A Head Full of Dreams	2015	
"Ghost Story"	Coldplay	A Sky Full of Stars	2014	
"Glass of Water"	Coldplay	Prospekt's March	2008	
"God = Love" (Hidden track)	Coldplay	Everyday Life	2019	
"God Put a Smile upon Your Face"	Coldplay	A Rush of Blood to the Head	2002	
"The Goldrush"	Coldplay	B-side of "Life in Technicolor II"	2009	
"Good Feelings" (with Ayra Starr)	Coldplay; Oyinkansola; Aderibigbe; Alex Pall; Andrew Taggart; Nile Rodgers	Moon Music	2024	
"Gravity" (Note: A re-recording appears as a B-side of "Talk".) (Embrace)	Coldplay	Out of Nothing	2004	
"Green Eyes"	Coldplay	A Rush of Blood to the Head	2002	
"Guns"	Coldplay	Everyday Life	2019	
"The Hardest Part"	Coldplay	X&Y	2005	
"Have Yourself a Merry Little Christmas" (Judy Garland live cover)	Hugh Martin †	Mince Spies	2001	
"A Head Full of Dreams"	Coldplay; Stargate	A Head Full of Dreams	2015	
"Help Is Round the Corner"	Coldplay	B-side of "Yellow"	2000	
"High Speed" (Note: Also appears on Parachutes (2000).)	Coldplay	The Blue Room	1999	
"Higher Power"	Coldplay; Max Martin; Federico Vindver; Denise Carite	Music of the Spheres	2021	
"A Hopeful Transmission"	Coldplay; Brian Eno	Mylo Xyloto	2011	
"How You See the World" (Note: A remix titled "How You See the World No. 2" appears on the album Help: A Day in the Life (2005).)	Coldplay	X&Y (Japanese edition first pressing)	2005	
"Human Heart" (stylised as "") (with We Are King and Jacob Collier)	Coldplay; Max Martin; Jacob Collier; Paris Strother; Amber Strother	Music of the Spheres	2021	
"Humankind"	Coldplay; Federico Vindver; Daniel Green; Jon Hopkins; Max Martin; Oscar Holter	Music of the Spheres	2021	
"Hurts Like Heaven"	Coldplay; Brian Eno	Mylo Xyloto	2011	
"Hymn for the Weekend" (Note: Features uncredited vocals by Beyoncé.)	Coldplay; Stargate	A Head Full of Dreams	2015	
"Hypnotised"	Coldplay	Kaleidoscope EP	2017	
"IAAM" (Note: An acoustic version titled "I Am a Mountain" appears on the Full Moon edition of Moon Music (2024).)	Coldplay; Oscar Holter; Max Martin	Moon Music	2024	
"I Bloom Blaum"	Coldplay	B-side of "In My Place"	2002	
"I Ran Away"	Coldplay	B-side of "The Scientist"	2002	
"In My Place" (Note: A live version appears on the album Live 8 (2005).)	Coldplay	A Rush of Blood to the Head	2002	
"In the Sun" (Joseph Arthur live cover) (with Michael Stipe)	Joseph Arthur; Joseph Lyburn †	In the Sun (Guft Coast Relief)	2006	
"Infinity Sign" (stylised as "")	Coldplay; Jon Hopkins; Max Martin	Music of the Spheres	2021	
"Ink"	Coldplay	Ghost Stories	2014	
"Jupiter"	Coldplay; Max Martin; Ilya Salmanzadeh; Jacob Collier; Olivia Waithe; Moses Martin; Orlando le Fleming	Moon Music	2024	
"Kaleidoscope"	Coldplay; Stargate	A Head Full of Dreams	2015	
"The Karate Kid"	Coldplay; John Metcalfe	Moon Music (Full Moon edition)	2024	
"Let Somebody Go" (with Selena Gomez)	Coldplay; Apple Martin; Olivia Waithe; Max Martin; Bill Rahko; Oscar Holter; Leland Wayne	Music of the Spheres	2021	
"Lhuna" (with Kylie Minogue)	Coldplay	Non-album single	2008	
"Life in Technicolor"	Coldplay; Jon Hopkins	Viva la Vida or Death and All His Friends	2008	
"Life in Technicolor II"	Coldplay	Prospekt's March	2008	
"Life Is for Living" (Hidden track)	Coldplay	Parachutes	2000	
"Lips Like Sugar" (Echo & the Bunnymen live cover)	Will Sergeant; Ian McCulloch; Les Pattinson; Pete de Freitas †	B-side of "The Scientist" (DVD single)	2002	
"Lost!" (Note: There are three different versions of "Lost!", including an acoustic version titled "Lost?", a remix featuring American rapper Jay-Z, titled "Lost+", and a live version titled "Lost@".)	Coldplay	Viva la Vida or Death and All His Friends	2008	
"Lovers in Japan" (Note: Combined into one track as "Lovers in Japan/Reign of Love" on Viva la Vida or Death and All His Friends.)	Coldplay	Viva la Vida or Death and All His Friends	2008	
"Low"	Coldplay	X&Y	2005	
"Lukas" (Natalie Imbruglia)	Coldplay	Come to Life	2009	
"Ma Meilleure Ennemie" (Extended Version) (with Stromae, Pomme and Elyanna)	Paul Van Haver; Claire Pommet; Luc Van Haver; Chris Martin; Alexander Seaver †	Arcane League of Legends: Season 2	2025	
"Magic"	Coldplay	Ghost Stories	2014	
"Major Minus"	Coldplay; Brian Eno	Mylo Xyloto	2011	
"Man in the Moon"	Coldplay; Max Martin; Oscar Holter	Moon Music (Full Moon edition)	2024	
"A Message" (Note: A live version titled "A Message 2010" appears on the album Hope for Haiti Now (2010).)	Coldplay	X&Y	2005	
"Midnight"	Coldplay; Jon Hopkins	Ghost Stories	2014	
"Miracles"	Coldplay	Unbroken	2014	
"Miracles (Someone Special)" (with Big Sean)	Coldplay; Sean Anderson	Kaleidoscope EP	2017	
"M.M.I.X."	Coldplay; Brian Eno	Mylo Xyloto	2011	
"Mooie Ellebogen" (Note: Translated to "Nice Elbows" literally or "Pretty Elbows" within context.) (Live)	Coldplay	B-side of "Clocks" (Dutch single)	2003	
"Moon Music" (Note: An instrumental version subtitled "Elodie" appears on the Full Moon edition of Moon Music (2024).) (with Jon Hopkins)	Coldplay; Jon Hopkins	Moon Music	2024	
"Moses" (Live)	Coldplay	Live 2003	2003	
"Moving to Mars"	Coldplay; Brian Eno	B-side of "Every Teardrop Is a Waterfall"	2011	
"Murder"	Coldplay	B-side of "God Put a Smile upon Your Face"	2003	
"Music of the Spheres" (stylised as "")	Coldplay; Max Martin	Music of the Spheres	2021	
"Music of the Spheres II" (stylised as "")	Coldplay; Rik Simpson; Daniel Green; Federico Vindver; Max Martin; Bill Rahko	Music of the Spheres	2021	
"My Universe" (with BTS)	Coldplay; Max Martin; Bill Rahko; Oscar Holter; Suga; J-Hope; RM	Music of the Spheres	2021	
"Mylo Xyloto"	Coldplay; Brian Eno	Mylo Xyloto	2011	
"No More Keeping My Feet on the Ground"	Coldplay	Safety	1998	
"Now My Feet Won't Touch the Ground"	Coldplay	Prospekt's March	2008	
"O"	Coldplay	Ghost Stories	2014	
"O (Reprise)"	Coldplay	A Sky Full of Stars	2014	
"Oceans"	Coldplay	Ghost Stories	2014	
"Ode to Deodorant" (as The Coldplay)	Coldplay	"Ode to Deodorant" (Cassette single)	1998	
"Old Friends"	Coldplay	Everyday Life	2019	
"On My Way Home" (Pentatonix)	Coldplay; Jordan Johnson; Sam Martin; Marcus Lomax; Jason Evigan; Stefan Johnson; Clarence Coffee	PTX, Vol. III	2014	
"One I Love"	Coldplay	B-side of "In My Place"	2002	
"One World"	Coldplay; Denise Carite; Brian Eno; Shaneka Hamilton; Apple Martin; John Metcalfe; Bill Rahko	Moon Music	2024	
"Only Superstition"	Coldplay	B-side of "Brothers & Sisters"	1998	
"Orphans"	Coldplay; Moses Martin	Everyday Life	2019	
"Parachutes"	Coldplay	Parachutes	2000	
"Paradise"	Coldplay; Brian Eno	Mylo Xyloto	2011	
"Paulistanos" (Live)	Coldplay	Live in São Paulo	2018	
"People of the Pride"	Coldplay; Max Martin; Bill Rahko; Derek Dixie; Samuel Falson; Jesse Rogg	Music of the Spheres	2021	
"Politik"	Coldplay	A Rush of Blood to the Head	2002	
"Poppyfields" (Note: Combined into one track as "Prospekt's March/Poppyfields".)	Coldplay	Prospekt's March	2008	
"Postcards from Far Away"	Coldplay	Prospekt's March	2008	
"Pour Me" (Live)	Coldplay	B-side of "Fix You"	2005	
"Princess of China" (with Rihanna)	Coldplay; Brian Eno	Mylo Xyloto	2011	
"Proof"	Coldplay	B-side of "Speed of Sound"	2005	
"Prospekt's March"	Coldplay	Prospekt's March	2008	
"Rainy Day"	Coldplay	Prospekt's March	2008	
"Reign of Love"	Coldplay	Viva la Vida or Death and All His Friends	2008	
"A Rush of Blood to the Head"	Coldplay	A Rush of Blood to the Head	2002	
"The Scientist"	Coldplay	A Rush of Blood to the Head	2002	
"See You Soon"	Coldplay	The Blue Room	1999	
"Shiver"	Coldplay	Parachutes	2000	
"A Sky Full of Stars" (Note: A remix subtitled "Robin Schulz Edit" appears on the album Prayer (2014).)	Coldplay; Tim Bergling	Ghost Stories	2014	
"Sleeping Sun"	Coldplay	B-side of "Talk"	2005	
"Something Just Like This" (with the Chainsmokers)	Coldplay; Andrew Taggart	Kaleidoscope EP	2017	
"Sparks"	Coldplay	Parachutes	2000	
"Speed of Sound"	Coldplay	X&Y	2005	
"A Spell a Rebel Yell"	Coldplay	B-side of "Violet Hill"	2008	
"Spies"	Coldplay	Parachutes	2000	
"Square One"	Coldplay	X&Y	2005	
"Strawberry Swing"	Coldplay	Viva la Vida or Death and All His Friends	2008	
"Such a Rush"	Coldplay	Safety	1998	
"Sunrise"	Coldplay; Davide Rossi	Everyday Life	2019	
"Swallowed in the Sea"	Coldplay	X&Y	2005	
"Talk"	Coldplay; Ralf Hütter; Karl Bartos; Emil Schult	X&Y	2005	
"Things I Don't Understand"	Coldplay	B-side of "Speed of Sound"	2005	
"Til Kingdom Come" (Note: Hidden track listed as "+" on the liner notes and booklet for X&Y.)	Coldplay	X&Y	2005	
"Timbuktu" (as Los Unidades) (featuring Stormzy, Jess Kent and Cassper Nyovest)	Coldplay; Caiphus Semenya; Clarence Charles; Michael Owuo Jr.	Global Citizen – EP 1	2018	
"Trouble" (Note: An acoustic version appears on the album 2 Meter Sessies, Vol. 10 (2001).)	Coldplay	Parachutes	2000	
"Trouble in Town"	Coldplay	Everyday Life	2019	
"True Love"	Coldplay	Ghost Stories	2014	
"Twisted Logic"	Coldplay	X&Y	2005	
"U.F.O."	Coldplay; Brian Eno	Mylo Xyloto	2011	
"Up in Flames"	Coldplay; Brian Eno	Mylo Xyloto	2011	
"Up with the Birds"	Coldplay; Brian Eno; Leonard Cohen	Mylo Xyloto	2011	
"Up&Up"	Coldplay; Stargate	A Head Full of Dreams	2015	
"Us Against the World"	Coldplay; Brian Eno	Mylo Xyloto	2011	
"Violet Hill"	Coldplay	Viva la Vida or Death and All His Friends	2008	
"Viva la Vida"	Coldplay	Viva la Vida or Death and All His Friends	2008	
"Voodoo" (as Los Unidades) (featuring Stargate, Tiwa Savage, Wizkid, Danny Ocean and David Guetta)	Coldplay; Tiwa Savage; Wizkid; Daniel Morales; David Guetta; Stargate	Global Citizen – EP 1	2018	
"Warning Sign"	Coldplay	A Rush of Blood to the Head	2002	
"A Wave" (stylised as "") (with Jon Hopkins)	Coldplay; Jon Hopkins	Moon Music (Full Moon edition)	2024	
"We All Fall in Love Sometimes" (Elton John cover)	Elton John; Bernie Taupin †	Revamp	2018	
"We Can Work It Out" (The Beatles live cover)	John Lennon; Paul McCartney †	A MusiCares Tribute to Paul McCartney	2015	
"We Never Change"	Coldplay	Parachutes	2000	
"We Pray" (Note: A live version appears on the album Futttura Live (2026).) (featuring Little Simz, Burna Boy, Elyanna and Tini)	Coldplay; Simbiatu Ajikawo; Shawn Carter; Elian Marjieh; Max Martin; Damini Ogulu; Ilya Salmanzadeh; Martina Stoessel	Moon Music	2024	
"We're a Team" (James Newton Howard)	Coldplay; James N. Howard	The Hunger Games: Catching Fire	2013	
"What If"	Coldplay	X&Y	2005	
"When I Need a Friend"	Coldplay	Everyday Life	2019	
"A Whisper"	Coldplay	A Rush of Blood to the Head	2002	
"White Shadows"	Coldplay	X&Y	2005	
"Wish I Was Here" (with Cat Power)	Coldplay	Wish I Was Here	2014	
"The World Turned Upside Down"	Coldplay	B-side of "Fix You"	2005	
"WOTW / POTP"	Coldplay	Everyday Life	2019	
"X Marks the Spot" (Hidden track)	Coldplay; Stargate	A Head Full of Dreams	2015	
"X&Y"	Coldplay	X&Y	2005	
"Yellow" (Note: A live version appears on the album Cold Live at the Chapel, Vol. 2 (2002).)	Coldplay	Parachutes	2000	
"Yes"	Coldplay	Viva la Vida or Death and All His Friends	2008	
"You Only Live Twice" (Nancy Sinatra live cover)	Leslie Bricusse; John Barry †	B-side of "Don't Panic"	2001	

== Unreleased songs ==
List of unreleased songs
Title	Details	Ref.
"2 Aliens"	Leaked demo from Music of the Spheres (2021).	
"1000–1 (Ballad of St. John)"	The song's title was written on a whiteboard in The South Bank Show, which accompanied the band for six months in 2009.	
"Afaik"	Leaked demo from A Head Full of Dreams (2015).	
"Aiko"	The song's title was written on a piano used during the promotion of Mylo Xyloto (2011).	
"Alien Radio"	The song's title was written on one of Buckland's guitars during the promotion of Mylo Xyloto (2011). To tease Music of the Spheres (2021), Coldplay used a fictional website named Alien Radio FM, featuring cryptic texts and audios.	
"Alive Day"	The song's title was written on a piano at the Bakery during an interview for 60 Minutes in 2009.	
"Arabesque"	The song's title was written on a piano at the Bakery during an interview for 60 Minutes in 2009. A song with the same name was released in Everyday Life (2019). Berryman and Martin explained the new track was built upon the old one.	
"Aurora Boreale"	Registered on the American Society of Composers, Authors and Publishers (ASCAP).	
"Before I Lose"	Performed at the Laurel Tree in March 1998.	
"Bit of a Bastard"	Written for the Game of Thrones: The Musical campaign at Red Nose Day in 2015.	
"Blasphemy"	Part of the rumoured track list for X&Y (2005) but ultimately scrapped before its release.	
"Blessed"	Leaked demo from Music of the Spheres (2021).	
"Bloodless Revolution"	Leaked demo from Viva la Vida or Death and All His Friends (2008).	
"Break of Dawn"	Leaked demo from A Head Full of Dreams (2015). Also known as "Vampire Symphony".	
"Brilliant"	Registered on the American Society of Composers, Authors and Publishers (ASCAP).	
"Bucket for a Crown"	Performed at the Little Noise Sessions in November 2006.	
"The Butterfly"	Announced as an upcoming track for Viva la Vida or Death and All His Friends (2008) but ultimately scrapped.	
"Buzz"	The song's title was written on a piano at the Bakery during an interview for 60 Minutes in 2009.	
"Call Me"	Written for the band's boy band side project Pectoralz and recorded by an unknown female artist looking for a record deal.	
"Car Kids"	The song's title was written on a whiteboard in The South Bank Show, which accompanied the band for six months in 2009.	
"Cartoon Head"	The song's title was written on a whiteboard in The South Bank Show, which accompanied the band for six months in 2009.	
"Cartoon Heart"	The song's title was written on a whiteboard in The South Bank Show, which accompanied the band for six months in 2009.	
"Charlie Brown Thanksgiving"	Registered on the American Society of Composers, Authors and Publishers (ASCAP).	
"Closer to Home"	Written for the Game of Thrones: The Musical campaign at Red Nose Day in 2015.	
"Conscious Pilot"	Registered on the American Society of Composers, Authors and Publishers (ASCAP).	
"December"	Written in 1997. Its elements were used in "Violet Hill", from Viva la Vida or Death and All His Friends (2008).	
"Déjà Vu"	Part of the rumoured track list for X&Y (2005) but ultimately scrapped before its release.	
"Deserter"	Registered on the American Society of Composers, Authors and Publishers (ASCAP).	
"Don Quixote"	Performed during the Viva la Vida Tour (2008–2010). Also known as "Spanish Rain".	
"Drift"	Registered on the American Society of Composers, Authors and Publishers (ASCAP).	
"Drinks on Me"	Early version of "Hymn for the Weekend", from A Head Full of Dreams (2015). Also known as "Drunk & High".	
"Drunks and Guns"	The song's title was written on a whiteboard in The South Bank Show, which accompanied the band for six months in 2009.	
"The Dubliners"	Performed during the Viva la Vida Tour (2008–2010).	
"Earthling"	Leaked demo from Music of the Spheres (2021).	
"Echo My Name (I Can't Believe You're Gone)"	Part of the rumoured track list for X&Y (2005) but ultimately scrapped before its release.	
"Eulogy (For a King)"	Registered on the American Society of Composers, Authors and Publishers (ASCAP).	
"Everyday Story"	Leaked demo from Everyday Life (2019).	
"The Fall of Man"	Announced as an upcoming track for Viva la Vida or Death and All His Friends (2008) but ultimately scrapped.	
"Family Tree"	Early version of "A Head Full of Dreams", from the album of the same name.	
"Famous Old Painters"	Leaked demo from Viva la Vida or Death and All His Friends (2008). Mentioned by Champion on Twitter.	
"Far Out"	Leaked demo from A Head Full of Dreams (2015).	
"Fingers Crossed"	Registered on the American Society of Composers, Authors and Publishers (ASCAP).	
"First Steps"	Leaked demo from Viva la Vida or Death and All His Friends (2008).	
"Forever, Whatever"	Leaked demo from A Head Full of Dreams (2015).	
"From Earth with Love"	Leaked demo from Moon Music (2024).	
"Fury"	Part of the rumoured track list for X&Y (2005) but ultimately scrapped before its release.	
"Gardeners on the Frontline"	The song's title was written on a whiteboard in The South Bank Show, which accompanied the band for six months in 2009.	
"A Ghost"	Registered on the American Society of Composers, Authors and Publishers (ASCAP).	
"Ghost Stories"	The song's title was written on a whiteboard in Coldplay: Ghost Stories (2014).	
"Gold"	Leaked demo from A Head Full of Dreams (2015).	
"Golden Arrow"	The song's title appeared spray-written on a wall at the band's studio, as shown in a 2011 interview.	
"Gone But Not F. Cotton"	Written and recorded on Fearne Cotton's last show for BBC Radio 1 in 2015.	
"Goodbye and Goodnight"	Leaked demo from Viva la Vida or Death and All His Friends (2008).	
"Great Expectations"	Registered on the American Society of Composers, Authors and Publishers (ASCAP).	
"Harbingers of Doom"	The song's title was written on a piano at the Bakery during an interview for 60 Minutes in 2009.	
"Harmless"	Performed at the 2 Meter Sessions television show in June 2000.	
"Harmony"	The song's title was written on a whiteboard in The South Bank Show, which accompanied the band for six months in 2009.	
"Heart on Fire"	Leaked demo from A Head Full of Dreams (2015).	
"Hook Up"	The song's title was written on a piano at the Bakery during an interview for 60 Minutes in 2009.	
"I Am Your Baby's Daddy" (as The Nappies)	Written by Martin as a joke for Gwyneth Paltrow following the birth of their daughter in 2004.	
"I Hear Noises"	Performed at the Laurel Tree in March 1998.	
"I Tried"	Registered on the American Society of Composers, Authors and Publishers (ASCAP).	
"I Trust Life"	Registered on the American Society of Composers, Authors and Publishers (ASCAP).	
"Idiot"	Registered on the American Society of Composers, Authors and Publishers (ASCAP).	
"If All Else Fails"	Performed at the Laurel Tree in January 1998.	
"If I Ever Fall in Love Again"	The song's title was written on a whiteboard in The South Bank Show, which accompanied the band for six months in 2009.	
"If She Comes Back"	Performed at a soundcheck in 2002, but never in a proper concert.	
"In Isolation"	Registered on the American Society of Composers, Authors and Publishers (ASCAP).	
"It Was a Wonderful Day"	The song's title was written on a piano at the Bakery during an interview for 60 Minutes in 2009.	
"Julens Ljus"	Written for the Game of Thrones: The Musical campaign at Red Nose Day in 2015.	
"Julia Roberts' Smile"	Registered on the American Society of Composers, Authors and Publishers (ASCAP).	
"Kiss on the Lips"	Leaked demo from Music of the Spheres (2021).	
"Ladder to the Sun"	Performed during the Rush of Blood to the Head Tour (2002–2003).	
"LeftRightLeftRightLeft"	Written for Viva la Vida or Death and All His Friends (2008) but scrapped before its release.	
"Legends"	Early version of "Adventure of a Lifetime", from A Head Full of Dreams (2015).	
"Life Is Beautiful"	Performed during the Head Full of Dreams Tour (2016–2017).	
"Love in a Lethal Dose"	Written for Mylo Xyloto (2011) but scrapped before its release. The song was later reworked with Avicii's help and renamed "Lethal Drug", being discarded once again. Additionally, a leaked demo featuring SZA appeared on the internet in 2022.	
"Loveless"	Leaked demo from Viva la Vida or Death and All His Friends (2008).	
"Lucky Sevens"	The song's title was written on a whiteboard in The South Bank Show, which accompanied the band for six months in 2009.	
"A Man for All Seasons (Still Goin' Strong)"	Written for the Game of Thrones: The Musical campaign at Red Nose Day in 2015.	
"The Man Who Swears"	Leaked demo from Viva la Vida or Death and All His Friends (2008). Its elements were used in "People of the Pride", from Music of the Spheres (2021).	
"Mining on the Moon"	Announced as an upcoming track for Viva la Vida or Death and All His Friends (2008) but ultimately scrapped.	
"Mist"	The song's title was written on a whiteboard in Coldplay: Ghost Stories (2014).	
"Name and Likeness"	Registered on the American Society of Composers, Authors and Publishers (ASCAP).	
"O (Part 2)"	Registered on the American Society of Composers, Authors and Publishers (ASCAP).	
"The Only One"	Leaked demo from Music of the Spheres (2021).	
"Orange"	Performed at BBC Radio 1's Big Weekend in 2024 as a tribute to Luton Town F.C. Martin wrote the song to acknowledge a local campaign that was carried out prior to the show, requesting the lyrics of "Yellow" to be changed to "Orange".	
"Original U.F.O."	Registered on the American Society of Composers, Authors and Publishers (ASCAP).	
"Panic"	Early version of "Don't Panic", from Parachutes (2000).	
"Poor Me"	Registered on the American Society of Composers, Authors and Publishers (ASCAP).	
"The Race"	Registered on the American Society of Composers, Authors and Publishers (ASCAP).	
"Rastafarian Targaryan"	Written for the Game of Thrones: The Musical campaign at Red Nose Day in 2015.	
"Red Wedding"	Written for the Game of Thrones: The Musical campaign at Red Nose Day in 2015.	
"Rescue Street"	Mentioned by Martin during an interview for Max in 2012. It had an a cappella section which "sounded horrific".	
"Robots"	Leaked demo from Music of the Spheres (2021).	
"Royalty"	Leaked demo from Music of the Spheres (2021).	
"School"	Leaked demo from Viva la Vida or Death and All His Friends (2008).	
"Sex & Violence"	The song's title was written on a whiteboard in The South Bank Show, which accompanied the band for six months in 2009.	
"Sherlock Holmes"	The song's title was written on a whiteboard in The South Bank Show, which accompanied the band for six months in 2009.	
"Shine On"	Performed at Fremont Street in May 2024.	
"So Sad"	Performed at the Laurel Tree in January 1998.	
"Solid Ground (Until the Water Flows Over)"	Performed during the Rush of Blood to the Head Tour (2002–2003).	
"Someone to Love"	Performed at a soundcheck in 2002, but never in a proper concert.	
"Something Ain't Right"	Part of the rumoured track list for X&Y (2005) but ultimately scrapped before its release.	
"Space Symphony"	The song's title was written on a whiteboard in The South Bank Show, which accompanied the band for six months in 2009.	
"Spiderwebs"	Early version of "Trouble", from Parachutes (2000).	
"St. Stephen"	Leaked demo from Viva la Vida or Death and All His Friends (2008).	
"Sweet Marianne"	Written by Champion for his then girlfriend, now wife, Marianna Dark.	
"This Hollow Frame"	Written for A Rush of Blood to the Head (2002) but scrapped before its release.	
"Tomorrow"	The song's title was written on a whiteboard in Coldplay: Ghost Stories (2014).	
"Treasure"	Leaked demo from Everyday Life (2019).	
"U.F.O. II"	Leaked demo from Music of the Spheres (2021).	
"A View from the Top"	Performed at a soundcheck in 2002, but never in a proper concert.	
"Vitamins"	Performed at the Laurel Tree in January 1998.	
"Voldermort"	Registered on the American Society of Composers, Authors and Publishers (ASCAP).	
"We Dance"	Performed at the FIFA World Cup final halftime show in July 2026.	
"Wedding Bells"	Performed at the Apple Keynote press conference in September 2010.	
"Wedding Song"	Registered on the American Society of Composers, Authors and Publishers (ASCAP).	
"Weirdo"	Mentioned by Martin during an interview for You Made It Weird in 2021.	
"Wilderness"	The song's title was written on a whiteboard in The South Bank Show, which accompanied the band for six months in 2009.	
"Wondering Star"	The song's title was written on a whiteboard in The South Bank Show, which accompanied the band for six months in 2009.	
"World Without You"	The song's title was written on a whiteboard in Coldplay: Ghost Stories (2014).	
"Young and in Love"	Leaked demo from Everyday Life (2019).	
"Your World Turns Upside Down"	Performed during the Rush of Blood to the Head Tour (2002–2003).	

== See also ==
- Coldplay discography
- Coldplay videography
- List of cover versions of Coldplay songs
