= Sparks (Coldplay song) =

2000 song by Coldplay

Song by Coldplay

from the album Parachutes
- Released: 10 July 2000
- Recorded: November 1999 – May 2000
- Genre: Soft rock; dream pop
- Length: 3:47
- Label: Parlophone
- Songwriters: Guy Berryman; Jonny Buckland; Will Champion; Chris Martin
- Producers: Ken Nelson; Coldplay

"Sparks" is a song by the British rock band Coldplay. It was written by all members of the group and co-produced by Ken Nelson for their debut album, Parachutes (2000). Described as a "calming" piece, the song had a chart resurgence in the 2020s.

== Recording ==
According to producer Ken Nelson, "Sparks" was recorded at the same time as "We Never Change". He described it as "basically a live take", with Jonny Buckland adding his guitar parts afterwards. The lyrics of the song tell the story of a person asking for a second chance after letting down their partner ("And I know I was wrong" / "But I won't let you down"). Mary Siroky from Consequence noted that "the waltz tempo ensures a feeling of intimacy and romantic longing persists".

== Reception ==
"Sparks" has been ranked among Coldplay's best works by Billboard, and Consequence. The former publication named the song one of the "40 Best Deep Cuts of 2000", adding that it contains "many of the touchstones that would become synonymous with the British rock band in the ensuing decades". The track went viral on TikTok, which paved the way to a music chart resurgence. In 2025, "Sparks" entered the platform's annual chart in the United Kingdom (number four) and worldwide (number 15).

== Performances ==
The band have played "Sparks" throughout the Parachutes (2000–2001), and Music of the Spheres (2022–2025) tours.

== Covers and samples ==
American R&B singer Brandy integrated the opening lyrics of the song in "I Tried", from her album Afrodisiac (2004). Kristina Train covered "Sparks" for I Give It a Year, a British romantic comedy released in 2013. Ten years later, Jordana shared a cover of the track as well.

== Personnel ==
Credits adapted from Tidal.

Band members

- Guy Berryman – bass, songwriter
- Jonny Buckland – guitar, piano, backing vocals, songwriter
- Will Champion – drums, percussion, backing vocals, songwriter
- Chris Martin – lead vocals, acoustic guitar, keyboards, songwriter

Additional personnel

- Ken Nelson – producer, engineer
- Andrea Wright – assistant engineer
- Jon Coles – assistant engineer
- Paul Read – assistant engineer
- Simon Barnicott – assistant engineer
- George Marino – mastering engineer
- Michael H. Brauer – mixing engineer
- Mark Phythian – programmer

== Charts ==
=== Weekly charts ===
Weekly chart performance
Chart (2022–2025)	Peak position
Australia (ARIA)	71
Canada Hot 100 (Billboard)	55
Global 200 (Billboard)	66
Greece International (IFPI)	52
Ireland (IRMA)	32
Lithuania (AGATA)	63
Lithuania Airplay (TopHit)	49
Netherlands (Single Top 100)	81
Norway (IFPI Norge)	40
Philippines (Philippines Hot 100)	69
Portugal (AFP)	95
Singapore (RIAS)	19
Sweden (Sverigetopplistan)	81
UK Singles (Official Charts)	18
US Billboard Hot 100	74
US Hot Rock & Alternative Songs (Billboard)	7

=== Year-end charts ===
Year-end chart performance
Chart (2025)	Position
US Hot Rock & Alternative Songs (Billboard)	18

== Certifications ==
Certifications
Region	Certification	Certified units/sales
Australia (ARIA)	2× Platinum	140,000^{‡}
Denmark (IFPI Danmark)	Platinum	90,000^{‡}
Italy (FIMI) Sales since 2009	Gold	50,000^{‡}
New Zealand (RMNZ)	4× Platinum	120,000^{‡}
Portugal (AFP)	2× Platinum	50,000^{‡}
Spain (Promusicae)	Platinum	100,000^{‡}
United Kingdom (BPI)	2× Platinum	1,200,000^{‡}
^{‡} Sales+streaming figures based on certification alone.
