= Paul Read (music producer) =

Paul Read is a recording engineer and music producer. He started his professional recording career at Rockfield Studios where he became a house engineer.

Some of his most successful work as recording engineer includes Nigel Kennedy’s string arrangements for the Donovan album ‘Sutras’ (produced by Rick Rubin), Catatonia, including sessions for ‘International Velvet’ (3× platinum) and Coldplay ‘Parachutes’ (9× platinum).

Read is quoted in the book Rock Legends at Rockfield, talking about recording sessions for the Coldplay album Parachutes

Paul Read is now a teacher of Audio Media Production at The Royal National College for the Blind in Hereford.
