= Parachutes (Coldplay album) =

2000 studio album by Coldplay

- Standard edition cover

Studio album by Coldplay
- Released: 10 July 2000
- Recorded: November 1999 – 15 May 2000 (Note: Except for "High Speed", which was recorded between June and August 1999.)
- Studios: Matrix (London); Wessex (London); Parr Street (Liverpool); Rockfield (Rockfield); Orinoco (London)
- Genres: Alternative rock; post-Britpop; indie rock; soft rock
- Length: 41:25
- Labels: Parlophone; Nettwerk
- Producers: Ken Nelson; Coldplay; Chris Allison

Coldplay chronology
The Blue Room (1999)	Parachutes (2000)	A Rush of Blood to the Head (2002)

Singles from Parachutes
- 1. "Shiver" Released: 6 March 2000; 2. "Yellow" Released: 26 June 2000; 3. "Trouble" Released: 23 October 2000; 4. "Don't Panic" Released: 19 March 2001

Parachutes is the debut studio album by the British rock band Coldplay. It was released on 10 July 2000 by Parlophone in the United Kingdom and on 7 November 2000 by Nettwerk in the United States. Ken Nelson and the band co-produced all songs except "High Speed", which was produced by Chris Allison alone. Parachutes spawned four singles: "Shiver", "Yellow", "Trouble" and "Don't Panic", the latter being limited to Europe. "Sparks" gained additional notability in the 2020s after going viral on video platform TikTok. In support of the album, Coldplay embarked on the Parachutes Tour (2000–2001).

The album was a commercial success and was met with positive reviews from critics. Upon release, it quickly reached number one in the United Kingdom and has since been certified 9× Platinum. In the United States, the album peaked at number 51 on the Billboard 200 and eventually was certified double platinum. It won the Grammy Award for Best Alternative Music Album in 2002, the British Album of the Year award at the 2001 Brit Awards, and many other accolades. Parachutes is also the 22nd-best-selling album of the 21st century in the United Kingdom. As of July 2020, it has sold over 13 million copies around the world.

== Recording and production ==
The band began production on Parachutes in late 1999, after producing and releasing The Blue Room EP with British record producer Chris Allison. Allison was asked to assist with production, and the band's musical direction, which was desired by both the band and the A&R department. Production started with the track "High Speed", which was part of the EP and was later re-released as a part of Parachutes. Allison describes "High Speed" as thus: "You'll notice it is quite a bit different to the other tracks, because there are other sounds going on in it: we wanted to mix a soundscape in with the classic rock sound on that particular track. I thought 'High Speed' was a really good marriage between the classic rock sound and the new sound that was developing out of it, something that was more atmospheric". Seven tracks in all were recorded during the sessions at Orinoco studios in London, with three of them ending up on The Blue Room EP.

The band then took a lengthy break to compose more tracks for Parachutes. A few months later, it was arranged that Allison and the band meet at a rehearsal room to finally begin production on the band's debut album. "They started up playing in the rehearsal room and they really weren't together at all. And I was very honest with them, I just sort of said 'Look, this simply isn't good enough'". Allison adds, "The interesting, the most significant thing that did occur out of the fact that we didn't end up starting the album on that day of the rehearsal was that Chris Martin had not written "Yellow" by that time".

A couple of months later, British record producer Ken Nelson was chosen, producing all but one song on Parachutes. He was introduced to Coldplay by his manager Pete Byrne (who gave him a copy of the band's Fierce Panda-distributed debut single in 1999). Nelson has claimed that, as soon as he heard vocalist Chris Martin's voice on the song "Bigger Stronger", he "realised that he was something special". Nelson was offered the job while Coldplay were performing in Liverpool with English indie rock band Gomez (whose debut album, Bring It On, was what he had produced at the time).

Coldplay initially planned to record Parachutes in the space of two weeks. However, tours and other live performances caused the recording to spread out between November 1999 and May 2000. The band began work on the album at Rockfield Studios in Wales, continuing with sessions at Liverpool's Parr Street Studios. The band worked in three studio rooms at Parr Street, mostly in the project studio which producer Ken Nelson describes as "basically a demo room". The Chris Allison-produced track "High Speed" was also included on the album, and originates from earlier sessions at Orinoco Studios in London. The album was mixed by American engineer Michael Brauer in New York. Coldplay's record label, Parlophone, had originally intended to use a mixing engineer for the tracks they picked as singles, but eventually hired Brauer to work on all songs on Parachutes except the song "High Speed" which was mixed by Chris Allison.

At the Liverpool concert where he was offered the production job, Nelson had noted that Coldplay's performance was "very very uptight [...] they rushed through the set and it was quite difficult to listen to". Once in the studio Nelson and the band went through each song, learning how to play the piece live and deciding what tempo to play it at in an attempt to get the group to "calm down" ("Trouble", for example, had to be reworked to eliminate the cacophony included in its early versions).

The album's cover features a photograph of a yellow globe taken with a disposable Kodak camera. The globe had been purchased from W H Smith for £10; it was featured in the music videos for "Shiver" and "Don't Panic", and also accompanied the band on their tours. The album was dedicated to drummer Will Champion's mother, Sara Champion, who died of cancer in May 2000, two months before the release of Parachutes.

== Music and style ==
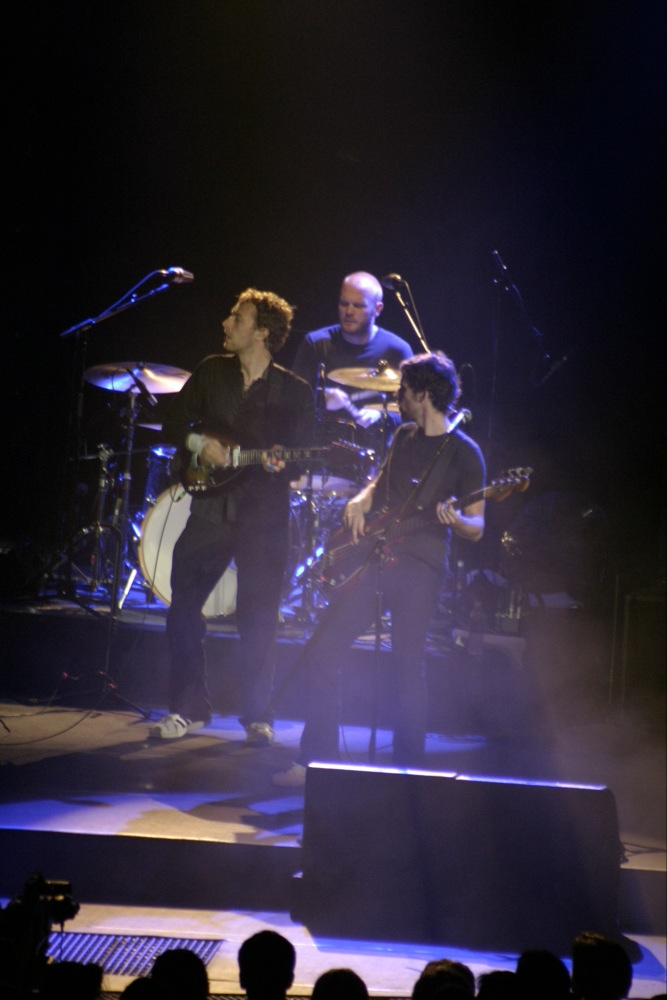
Coldplay performing "Don't Panic" in the 2005 Twisted Logic Tour.

Champion has explained that Nelson's production style was liberating and allowed the band to feel at ease during the recording of Parachutes (many songs from the album often featured slow tempos). The ensuing album was "a record's worth of moody and atmospheric tunes". As a nod to the moods created by the album, Champion has compared the song lyrics to the 1972 song "Perfect Day" by American rock singer-songwriter Lou Reed, stating that the "lyrics are beautiful and they're really, really happy, but the music is really, really sad. It's that kind of thing, where you can create [differing] moods through the music and lyrics".

Parachutes was recognised to have an alternative rock, indie rock, and post-Britpop sound, with some stylistic comparisons being made to contemporaries such as Radiohead and Travis. In fact, a few critics have suggested that the album's commercial success was due in part to a portion of Radiohead's audience being alienated by the band's experimental and more electronic-influenced Kid A album.

== Release and promotion ==
Parachutes was first released on 10 July 2000 by Parlophone in the United Kingdom, which was part of EMI. For international marketing, the company followed a process where artists were picked by either Virgin, Manhattan or Capitol in the United States, not having their albums issued otherwise. All three labels rejected Coldplay, driving them to sign with Nettwerk. The record was made available on 7 November 2000 and radio stations were served to "Yellow" in January 2001. Capitol took over distribution six months later.

The album was blocked from release in China due to "inflammatory political content". Government officials singled out "Spies" as the prime offender. In 2020, Coldplay released a 20th anniversary edition of Parachutes in transparent yellow vinyl. Its main version has 10 tracks, with "Everything's Not Lost" being accompanied by a hidden segment called "Life Is for Living".

Japanese pressings include the songs "Careful Where You Stand" and "For You", which were originally released as the B-sides of "Shiver". The hidden portion is located at the pre-gap of track 11. Four singles were released in total: "Shiver", "Yellow", "Trouble" and "Don't Panic". Upon the release of "Trouble", Coldplay abandoned their initial plan of releasing "Don't Panic", since they deemed three singles were enough for an album. However, a number of CDs were made available in select European countries.

== Critical reception ==
=== Reviews ===
Professional ratings
Aggregate scores
Source	Rating
Metacritic	72/100
Review scores
Source	Rating
AllMusic	4.5/5 stars
Alternative Press	4/5
Entertainment Weekly	B+
Los Angeles Times	3.5/4 stars
NME	9/10
Pitchfork	5.3/10
Q	4/5 stars
Rolling Stone	3.5/5 stars
The Rolling Stone Album Guide	4/5 stars
Uncut	4/5 stars

Parachutes was released to generally favourable reviews from music critics. At Metacritic, which assigns a normalized rating out of 100 to reviews from mainstream critics, the album received an average score of 72, based on 20 reviews. In a contemporary review of the album, Michael Hubbard of musicOMH called it "an album of remarkable depth, especially when one considers the youthful ages of the band members". Siobhan Grogan of NME stated that "all told, it's incredible this is a debut album" and concluded that "accomplished, yet subtle, it works perfectly as a whole in a way all the production skills in the world couldn't replicate". Melody Maker hailed Parachutes as a "masterpiece" and "a defining musical statement of 2000", while James Oldham of Uncut felt that the album "more than justifies the plaudits heaped upon [the band] by the weekly music press". The Guardian described the album as "one of the year's most uplifting albums", adding that it features "elegant songs, classic guitars and gorgeous singing".

While noting that Parachutes "brings nothing new to the table" and that its "musical reference points are immediately recognizable and difficult to overlook", Billboard stated that the band "seems talented enough to transcend this early identity crisis". Matt Diehl of Rolling Stone opined that the album "ultimately rises above its influences to become a work of real transcendence". In a retrospective write-up, MacKenzie Wilson of AllMusic commented that Parachutes introduced the band as "young musicians still honing their sweet harmonies", adding that the album "deserved the accolades it received because it followed the general rule when introducing decent pop songs: keep the emotion genuine and real".

In a less-enthusiastic review, Pitchfork called the album "harmless and pretty... [but] nothing else". Barry Walters, writing in The Village Voice, similarly writes that "there's little on Parachutes that demands attention or punctures the pensive spell, and, unlike Travis's, Coldplay's hooks are slight". In his Consumer Guide column for The Village Voice, Robert Christgau selected "Yellow" and "Don't Panic" as "choice cuts", indicating good songs on "an album that isn't worth your time or money". Setareh Yousefi of Stylus Magazine felt that "the finer moments of Parachutes are blended with some boring sappy songs", with Martin's "powerful voice" ultimately being "in many ways wasted on songs that are alright but not bewildering".

=== Rankings ===
List of critic rankings
Publication	Year	Description	Result	Ref.
Loudwire	2025	The Best Alt-Rock Album of Each Year of the 2000s	Placed	
Newsweek	2021	50 Best Rock Albums from the 21st Century	35	
NME	2000	Best Albums of 2000	6	
NME	2006	100 Greatest British Albums Ever	33	
NME	2010	The 50 Greatest Debut Albums Ever	Placed	
NME	2013	The 500 Greatest Albums of All Time	272	
The Observer	2004	The 100 Greatest British Albums	93	
Q	2000	Recordings of the Year – 2000	Placed	
Q	2010	Albums of the 21st Century	51	
Q	2016	The Greatest Albums of the Last 30 Years	Placed	
Radio X	2021	The Best British Debut Albums of the 2000s	Placed	
Rolling Stone	2011	100 Best Albums of the 2000s	73	
Spin	2000	Best Albums of 2000	19	
The Times	2000	Best Albums of the Year 2000	17	
Uncut	2024	The 500 Greatest Albums of the 2000s	105	
Under the Radar	2009	Best Albums of the Decade (2000–2009)	85	
Uproxx	2023	The Best Debut Albums Ever	83	
The Village Voice	2000	Pazz & Jop Critics Poll	30	
WXPN	2021	All Time Greatest Albums	329	

== Accolades ==
List of awards and nominations
Year	Ceremony	Category	Result	Ref.
2000	Gaffa Awards (Denmark)	International Album of the Year	Nominated	
2000	Mercury Prize	Album of the Year	Nominated	
2000	Q Awards	Best Album	Won	
2001	Brit Awards	British Album of the Year	Won	
2001	NME Awards	Best Album	Nominated	
2002	Grammy Awards	Best Alternative Music Album	Won	

== Commercial performance ==
The popularity of the songs in British clubs, pubs and sporting events led Parachutes to debut at number-one in the UK Albums Chart with 70,935 copies sold. Its biggest sales period, however, was during the penultimate week of 2000, when the album sold 170,642 copies and surpassed one million total sales. The record is certified 9× Platinum by the British Phonographic Industry for selling 2.7 million copies. In July 2011, it climbed from number 184 to number 48 for a 318th charting week. In 2022, Parachutes was named the tenth most successful debut album in United Kingdom history. Parachutes has sold 31,922 cassettes in the UK, making it the 33rd best-selling cassette since 2000.

In the US Billboard 200, Parachutes debuted at number 189 with 14,672 copies sold on the week ending 30 December 2000, five weeks after its release. It later peaked at number 51 and reached number one on Billboard Heatseekers. The album has been certified 2× Platinum by the Recording Industry Association of America for shipping over 2 million units in the country. It was certified 4× Platinum in Australia as well. In 2003, the record received a 2× Platinum certification in Canada. In Japan, Parachutes debuted at number 174 with 796 copies sold. A week later, it reached a new peak at number 135, with 1,071 copies.

== Legacy ==
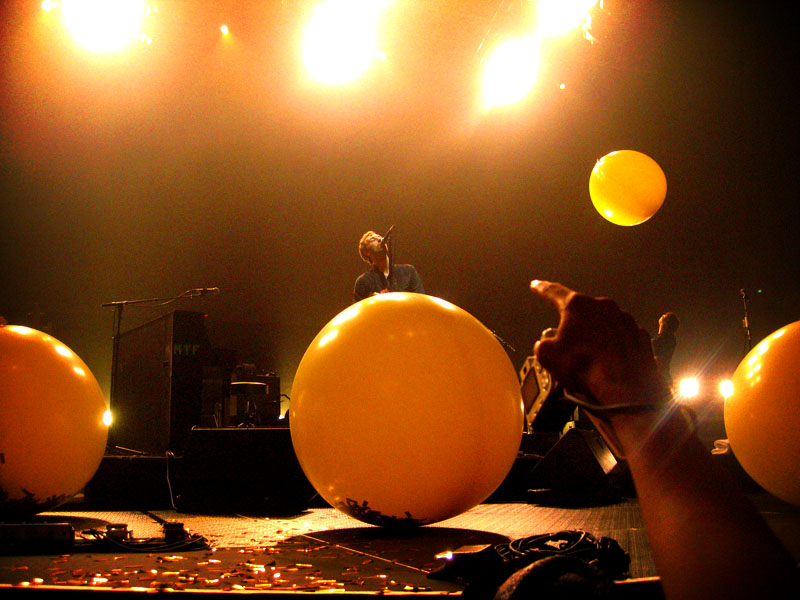
Coldplay still perform songs from Parachutes during their concerts, most notably "Yellow".

With over 2.7 million units sold in the United Kingdom, Parachutes is the 22nd best-selling album of the 21st century and 45th of all time in the country. British trade paper Music Week praised it as one of the most impressive debut records ever, spawning hit singles "Shiver", "Trouble" and "Yellow". The latter was included on Rock and Roll Hall of Fame's Songs That Shaped Rock and Roll exhibit for being among the most successful and important recordings in music. In 2010, Parachutes was included on the 1001 Albums You Must Hear Before You Die book. In 2013, NME ranked it at number 272 on their "The 500 Greatest Albums of All Time" list.

Jon O'Brien from the Recording Academy labelled it as Coldplay's most influential album to date, impacting the work of artists such as The Fray, Snow Patrol and OneRepublic. In a 25th anniversary review for Consequence, Paolo Ragusa wrote that the album "became quietly influential" in the evolution of alternative rock in the 2000s, providing a "much softer version of masculinity than what was popular and encouraged at the time". He discussed the newfound popularity of "Sparks" as well, declaring that it "reveals a demand for the kind of unguarded intimacy that Parachutes offered; not to mention that in the 2020s, that dreamy-but-confessional style of alternative rock has found a resurgence via acts like Phoebe Bridgers, Sam Fender and Hozier".

== Track listing ==
All tracks are written by Coldplay.

Parachutes – standard edition track listing
No.	Title	Length
1.	"Don't Panic"	2:17
2.	"Shiver"	4:59
3.	"Spies"	5:18
4.	"Sparks"	3:47
5.	"Yellow"	4:29
6.	"Trouble"	4:30
7.	"Parachutes"	0:46
8.	"High Speed"	4:14
9.	"We Never Change"	4:09
10.	"Everything's Not Lost"	7:15
Total length:		41:25

Parachutes – Japanese edition bonus tracks
No.	Title	Length
11.	"Careful Where You Stand"	4:45
12.	"For You"	5:42
Total length:		51:52

Notes

- "Everything's Not Lost" contains the hidden track "Life Is for Living", which begins at 5:39.
- "Life Is for Living" is located in the pre-gap of "Careful Where You Stand" on the Japanese edition.

== Personnel ==
Credits adapted from the album's CD booklet, and Sound on Sound.

Coldplay

- Chris Martin – vocals, acoustic guitar, piano, pump organ
- Jonny Buckland – electric guitar, vocals on "Don't Panic"
- Guy Berryman – bass guitar
- Will Champion – drums, percussion

Technical

- Ken Nelson – production (except "High Speed"); engineering
- Coldplay – production (except "High Speed")
- Chris Allison – production, engineering, mixing ("High Speed")
- Andrea Wright – engineering assistant
- Jon Coles – engineering assistant
- Paul Read – engineering assistant
- Simon Barnicott – engineering assistant
- Mark Phythian – "computer magic"
- Michael H. Brauer – mixing
- George Marino – mastering (at Sterling Sound)

Additional personnel

- Phil Harvey – management
- Coldplay – design, cover photograph
- Mark Tappin – design assistant (at Blue Source)
- Tom Sheehan – photography
- Sarah Lee – photography

== Charts ==
=== Weekly charts ===
Weekly chart performance
Chart (2000–2025)	Peak position
Argentine Albums (CAPIF)	6
Australian Albums (ARIA)	2
Australian Alternative Albums (ARIA)	1
Austrian Albums (Ö3 Austria)	36
Belgian Albums (Ultratop Flanders)	19
Belgian Albums (Ultratop Wallonia)	35
Canadian Albums (Billboard)	19
Czech Albums (ČNS IFPI)	36
Danish Albums (Hitlisten)	29
Dutch Albums (Album Top 100)	7
European Albums (Music & Media)	12
Finnish Albums (Suomen virallinen lista)	4
French Albums (SNEP)	31
German Albums (Offizielle Top 100)	54
Hungarian Albums (MAHASZ)	29
Icelandic Albums (Tónlistinn)	17
Irish Albums (IRMA)	2
Italian Albums (FIMI)	11
Japanese Albums (Oricon)	135
Lithuanian Albums (AGATA)	91
Mexican Albums (Top 100 Mexico)	66
New Zealand Albums (RMNZ)	4
Norwegian Albums (VG-lista)	1
Norwegian Rock Albums (IFPI Norge)	1
Portuguese Albums (AFP)	3
Scottish Albums (Official Charts)	1
Slovak Albums (ČNS IFPI)	89
South Korean Albums (Gaon)	75
South Korean International Albums (Gaon)	10
Spanish Albums (AFYVE)	31
Swedish Albums (Sverigetopplistan)	5
Swiss Albums (Schweizer Hitparade)	38
UK Albums (Official Charts)	1
US Billboard 200	51

=== Monthly charts ===
Monthly chart performance
Chart (2017)	Peak position
South Korean International Albums (Gaon)	18

=== Year-end charts ===
Year-end chart performance
Chart (2000)	Position
European Albums (Music & Media)	49
UK Albums (OCC)	9

Chart (2001)	Position
Australian Albums (ARIA)	13
Canadian Albums (Nielsen SoundScan)	46
Dutch Albums (Album Top 100)	86
European Albums (Music & Media)	25
French Albums (SNEP)	86
Irish Albums (IRMA)	18
Italian Albums (FIMI)	50
New Zealand Albums (RMNZ)	4
UK Albums (OCC)	19
US Billboard 200	105

Chart (2002)	Position
Canadian Albums (Nielsen SoundScan)	156
UK Albums (OCC)	88

Chart (2003)	Position
UK Albums (OCC)	116
US Catalog Albums (Billboard)	6

Chart (2005)	Position
UK Albums (OCC)	101

Chart (2011)	Position
UK Albums (OCC)	195

Chart (2017)	Position
South Korean International Albums (Gaon)	83

Chart (2022)	Position
Belgian Albums (Ultratop Flanders)	186
Dutch Albums (Album Top 100)	86
Icelandic Albums (Tónlistinn)	67
Lithuanian Albums (AGATA)	84
Portuguese Albums (AFP)	86

Chart (2023)	Position
Dutch Albums (Album Top 100)	51
Icelandic Albums (Tónlistinn)	54
Swedish Albums (Sverigetopplistan)	81

Chart (2024)	Position
Dutch Albums (Album Top 100)	66
Icelandic Albums (Tónlistinn)	49
Swedish Albums (Sverigetopplistan)	82

Chart (2025)	Position
Belgian Albums (Ultratop Flanders)	193
Dutch Albums (Album Top 100)	37
Icelandic Albums (Tónlistinn)	26
Swedish Albums (Sverigetopplistan)	62

=== Decade-end charts ===
Decade-end chart performance
Chart (2000–2009)	Position
Australian Albums (ARIA)	99
UK Albums (OCC)	13

== Certifications and sales ==
Certifications and sales
Region	Certification	Certified units/sales
Argentina (CAPIF)	Platinum	60,000^{^}
Australia (ARIA)	4× Platinum	280,000^{‡}
Belgium (BRMA)	2× Platinum	100,000^{*}
Canada (Music Canada)	2× Platinum	200,000^{^}
Denmark (IFPI Danmark)	5× Platinum	100,000^{‡}
France (SNEP)	2× Gold	200,000^{*}
Germany (BVMI)	Gold	150,000^{^}
Iceland (FHF)	Gold	8,700 (Note: Icelandic total sales for Parachutes as of July 2005.)
Italy (FIMI) Sales since 2009	2× Platinum	100,000^{‡}
Japan	—	8,036 (Note: Japanese physical sales for Parachutes as of September 2008.)
Netherlands (NVPI)	Platinum	80,000^{^}
New Zealand (RMNZ)	4× Platinum	75,000 (Note: New Zealand total sales for Parachutes as of October 2012.)
Norway (IFPI Norway)	Platinum	60,000 (Note: Norwegian total sales for Parachutes as of July 2002.)
Poland (ZPAV)	Platinum	20,000^{‡}
South Korea	—	807 (Note: South Korean year-end physical sales for Parachutes in 2017.)
Spain (Promusicae)	Gold	50,000^{^}
Sweden (GLF)	Platinum	80,000^{^}
Switzerland (IFPI Switzerland)	Gold	25,000^{^}
United Kingdom (BPI)	9× Platinum	2,780,836 (Note: British total sales for Parachutes as of October 2021.)
United States (RIAA)	2× Platinum	5,600,000 (Note: American total sales for Parachutes as of June 2025.)
Summaries
Europe (IFPI)	4× Platinum	4,000,000^{*}
^{*} Sales figures based on certification alone.^{^} Shipments figures based on certification alone.^{‡} Sales+streaming figures based on certification alone.

== See also ==
- 2000 in British music
- List of best-selling albums in Belgium
- List of best-selling albums in the United Kingdom
- List of number-one albums in Norway
- List of UK Albums Chart number ones of the 2000s
