= Kung Faux =

- Created by: Mic Neumann
- Starring: (various)
- Country of origin: United States

Production
- Running time: 26 min

Original release
- Network: Fuse
- Release: 2003

Kung Faux is an international action comedy television series and audiovisual art assemblage created by Mic Neumann, an American creator–developer showrunner, conceptual artist and multimedia entrepreneur, who remixes classic kung fu films with popular music and comic book style editing along with video game style visual effects and new storylines featuring voice acting by contemporary art stars, hip hop personalities, and pop culture icons.

== History ==
Kung Faux was first created as an art project turned movie treatment in the late 90's before transforming into a half-hour television series by Kung Faux creator, producer, director and cultural engineer Michael "Mic" Neumann in 1999. Neumann described the creative process as treating original films like a DJ treats records, sampling the melting pot of music and demixing pop culture to assemble new collisions of sounds and palettes. The series incorporates creative elements from classic video games and comic book culture–namely, with superimposed text and supernatural embellishments, edited in a cut-and-paste style reminiscent of hip-hop production techniques, creating coherent audiovisual samples that together tell a cohesive story using overlaid video transitions that add thrilling punctuation to the densely layered musical soundtrack and inspired voice-over dubbing loaded with regional slang and cultural references.

Kung Faux first appeared publicly as a narrative collection of video art film stills derived from the series that exhibited at the original Ace Hotel alongside the works of such artists as Kaws and Shepard Fairey in 1999, while short video clips from the series also streamed on the websites Popdetail.com, Dubtitled.com and Heavy.com as video treatments for a larger proposed sequential art project and feature length film version of the Kung Faux concept, before then repurposing its comprehensive remix formula in 2001 to transform Kung Faux into an episodic format for television that first aired in 2003 as part of the inaugural launch of the Fuse music television channel in the United States, formerly known as MuchMusic USA, and a subsidiary of Rainbow Media's AMC Networks. From there, Mic Neumann continued to repurpose, revision, remix and transform Kung Faux into a distinctive audiovisual artwork and brand that has evolved through various forms and channels to over 150+ countries worldwide.

== Reception ==
"Kung Faux is many things, but first and foremost, it is hilarious. Irreverent modern concerns collided with serious '70s martial art sensibilities", wrote Conor Herbert in a featured article titled "An Ode to Kung Faux – The Show That Married Martial Arts and Hip-Hop". "Kung Faux creator and postmodern revisionist Mic Neumann, has an offering worthy of the postmodernism canon, alongside Jean-Luc Godard's Weekend and Luis Buñuel's Chien Andalou", reported Steve Johnston of The Film Cynics. The author Vincent LoBrutto called Kung Faux "a clever amalgam of kung fu movies and pop culture" in his book titled TV in the USA: A History of Icons, Idols & Ideas. Rashaun Hall of Billboard considered the mix of vintage kung-fu film footage, voice-overs with rappers, comic book style special effects, and a hip-hop soundtrack to be "a high-flying, hilarious send-up of the kung-fu genre." Evan Serpick, editor of Entertainment Weekly said the first two episodes of Kung Faux "are filled with hysterical and clever infusions". The Orlando Sentinel's Matthew Mark said "Kung Faux is a work of postmodernism that would make Jacques Derrida's head spin." Muzik editor Conor W. McNicholas included Kung Faux in the magazine's Special Edition "Hot 50" issue, calling it "Comedy Gold" and Beth Accomando, the Arts and Culture reporter for KPBS (TV), said Kung Faux is "Hilarious, Fresh and Inspired".

== Releases ==
Kung Faux series soundtrack music and voice acting roles were performed by such artists as De La Soul, Guru, Masta Ace, Queen Latifah, Biz Markie, Afrika Bambaataa, Eminem, Kaws, Eli Janney, Craig Wedren, Steve Powers, Aida Ruilova, Mark Ronson, Helena Christensen, Crazy Legs, Willi Ninja, Information Society, Elephant Man, Jean Grae, Mr. Len, Lord Sear, Roc Raida, Sadat X, Indo G, Ron Van Clief, Harold Hunter, Dimitri from Paris, Above The Law, MF Doom, Quasimoto, Mix Master Mike, Beastie Boys, Petter, Scribe, P-Money, Curse, Gentleman, Assassin, Fannypack, Grooverider, Stetsasonic, Force MDs, and Naughty by Nature.

In 2003, the first volume of the Kung Faux collection was released commercially by Dubtiled Entertainment and Tommy Boy Films, along with the introduction of a Special Edition art toy from the Kung Faux line of Action Figgaz titled "Break Boy", which was licensed by Art Asylum and created for their collectable line of Minimates. The Oklahoma Daily proclaimed the Kung Faux television series to be "a solid piece of pop culture phenomena" and the debut of the first DVD release to be "a work of art". Later that same year, the Kung Faux series broke into the Top Ten List of Spin Magazine's Top 20 chart for ranking notable movers within the news and pop culture.

In 2004, Madman Entertainment licensed the video distribution rights to Kung Faux for Australia and New Zealand, and Acclaim Entertainment optioned the Kung Faux video game rights for international development and global distribution before the publisher ultimately filed for bankruptcy and reverted the option.

In 2005, Starz debuted Kung Faux when the channel started to introduce unique programming to compete with rival pay TV services HBO and Showtime. Later that same year, Kustom World in the United Kingdom, licensed the Kung Faux brand to create a line of limited edition merchandise and fashion products for international distribution, and Entertainment One with Koch Entertainment licensed the Kung Faux video distribution rights for the United States and Canada.

In 2006, the artist duo known as Gnarls Barkley did a collaborative short film with Kung Faux which aired heavily around the world on the Channel V networks owned by STAR TV and Fox International Channels, fully owned subsidiaries of News Corporation.

In 2007, Kung Faux debuted on the VIVA network in Germany, the Rede Globo network in Brazil, and the Nelonen network in Finland.

In 2008, Kung Faux debuted in Canada on Showcase, IFC, and MuchMusic, as well as in Japan on the Music On! TV network, a subsidiary of Sony Music Entertainment Japan.

In 2009, Kung Faux debuted on the Australian Broadcasting Corporation network, as well as Italy's GXT network, who debuted a Remixed version of Kung Faux with the artist Eminem.

In 2010, Kung Faux debuted on Twitter, and the Hollywood filmmaker Brett Ratner, known for such films as The Family Man, Red Dragon, the Rush Hour series and X-Men: The Last Stand, edited an English version of the Bollywood film Kites, headlining Hrithik Roshan and Bárbara Mori, using a comprehensive Remix formula originated by the international Kung Faux television series.

In 2011, Kung Faux debuted in Sub-Saharan Africa on the Sony MAX network, a subsidiary of Sony Channel South Africa, where it was described as a "Boundary-Busting Action Comedy Series".

In 2013, Kung Faux in commemoration of its ten-year anniversary debut, released a limited edition promotional mixtape featuring ten of the most prominently used Tommy Boy Records songs from the original series soundtrack. All ten of the songs are performed by the pioneering G-funk artists known as Above the Law (group), and when the mixtape is reposted online by fans, it is frequently taken down or blocked from being played due to the prolific use of the N-word in the lyrics of the songs.

In 2016, Kung Faux audio clips from the television episode titled "Funky Bottoms" were sampled for the Stones Throw Records released album titled Yes Lawd! by the Grammy Award winning American musician and producer duo of Anderson Paak and Knxwledge, professionally known as NxWorries. This critically acclaimed Top Ten release peaked at #3 on the US Billboard charts for Top R&B/Hip Hop Albums in that same year.

In 2019, Kung Faux debuted as a featured tribute titled "An Ode to Kung Faux – The Show That Married Martial Arts and Hip-Hop" on the DJ Booth Network's digital music and media platform.
