= 1988 (Knxwledge album) =

Studio album by Knxwledge
- Released: March 27, 2020
- Studio: Knxwledge's home
- Genres: Instrumental hip hop, funk, jazz, soul, R&B
- Length: 37:57
- Label: Stones Throw Records

Knxwledge chronology
MEEK.VOL5 (2020)	1988 (2020)	HX.PRT14.8 (2020)

Singles from 1988
- 1. "Do You" Released: January 7, 2020; 2. "Learn" Released: February 12, 2020; 3. "Howtokope." Released: February 12, 2020; 4. "dont be afraid" Released: March 4, 2020; 5. "[bc]tm_s not promised" Released: March 4, 2020; 6. "Listen" Released: March 22, 2020

1988 is the second studio album by American hip hop record producer Knxwledge, released on March 27, 2020 through Stones Throw Records.

== Background ==
Knxwledge has released over 100 projects; 1988 is his second studio album released through Stones Throw Records. It follows MEEK.VOL5, released on January 24, 2020, the fifth in a remix album series of Meek Mill freestyles, and is an official follow up to his first studio album, Hud Dreems, released on May 5, 2015. The album is named after the year that Knxwledge was born. It contains themes of emotional growth as one ages. It was produced at his home studio, using instruments including a SP-303, Mellotron, and Prophet keyboard.

== Composition ==
The album is primarily an instrumental hip hop record and contains samples from a variety of media sources, including music, film, and radio interviews.

"Dont be afraid" features a pitched-up sample of “Surrender” by Kut Klose and galvanizing percussion and horns. “[Bc] tm_s not promised” is an ambient track that contains a piano loop and vocal samples. “Do You” contains layers of synths, piano chords, drum loops, and bass guitar, alongside a vocal sample of "Just Because I'm Wrong" by Gerald Levert. "Listen" contains a sample of a church pastor and gospel singers. "Learn" is a "warm, electro-based and lo-fi" track composed of drums and bass lines. "Howtokope." contains a vocal sample of a Ebro Darden radio interview. "With[reality]" features a rapper making aggressive threats over an analogue synth riff that gives the track a "dreamlike quality." "Solivelife" contains pitched Anderson .Paak vocals over horn samples. “Watchwhoyoukallyourhomie” samples a Meek Mill freestyle. "Don_tgottabe" contains a humming vocal sample, guitar strums, punchy drums, and minimalistic percussion. “Awomanslifeislove” is a funk track containing bass, drums, and a cracking snare. "Amansloveislife_keepon" contains a sample of "Keep On" by Kut Klose.

== Release ==
On January 7, 2020, Knxwledge released the album's lead single, "Do You". On February 12, 2020, the album's next two singles, "Learn" and "Howtokope." were released. He released the album's next two singles "dont be afraid" and "[bc]tm_s not promised" on March 3, 2020, alongside an animated music video by Rhymezlikedimez. The album released on March 27, 2020. An animated music video for "makeitliveforever" was released on the same day. An animated music video for "Don_tgottabe" was released on May 7, 2020.

== Critical reception ==
Professional ratings
Aggregate scores
Source	Rating
Metacritic	80/100
Review scores
Source	Rating
AllMusic	4/5 stars
Exclaim!	7/10
Pitchfork	7/10
Q	4/5 stars

According to the review aggregator Metacritic, 1988 received "generally favorable reviews" based on a weighted average score of 80 out of 100 from 5 critic scores.

Writing for Q, Rupert Howe said that the album "radiates a warmth often missing from other hi-tech laptop jams." Exclaim!'s Kyle Mullin concludes that the album maintains a "soulful throwback sound" while "stretching in unpredictable new directions." In his review for Pitchfork, Stephen Kearse praised Knxwledge as a "distinctive and prolific sculptor of sounds" but that said that 1988 did not do enough to distinguish itself from his other albums. Andy Kellman of AllMusic praised the variety of samples used in the album as "cutting across genres, decades, and moods."

Micah Peters of The Ringer described the album as "a shifting collage of analog sounds and surprise vocals." Hypebeast's Patrick Johnson wrote that the album "craft[s] a narrative of gratitude, and offers up a soundtrack that can even be considered soothing given the current unprecedented times of self-quarantines and isolation." The Asbury Park Press listed the album as a top Jersey album of 2020. Writing for The Fader, Shaad D'Souza described the album as "another warm, soulful chapter of Knxwledge’s output." Jim Wilson of The Michigan Daily wrote that the album was innovative in an "ultra-modern landscape" despite its "throwback nature."

=== Accolades ===
Publication	Accolade	Rank	Ref.
Okayplayer	Best Albums of 2020	15	
XLR8R	Our Favorite Releases of 2020	—N/a	

== Track listing ==
All music produced by Glen Earl Boothe.

No.	Title	Length
1.	"Dont Be Afraid"	1:34
2.	"[Bc] Tm_s Not Promised"	0:54
3.	"Do You"	2:49
4.	"Thats Allwekando."	0:57
5.	"Listen"	1:14
6.	"Learn"	1:41
7.	"Howtokope."	2:00
8.	"With[reality]"	0:54
9.	"Uonlygetone"	0:55
10.	"Solivelife"	1:39
11.	"Be Safe"	1:00
12.	"Watchwhoukallyourhomie"	1:29
13.	"Theykome&go"	1:33
14.	"Don_tgottabe"	2:09
15.	"Gangstallthetime"	1:58
16.	"Believeme"	1:08
17.	"Itkanbe[sonice]" (featuring NxWorries)	1:43
18.	"Makeuseofthetime"	1:18
19.	"Makeitliveforever"	1:50
20.	"Awomanslifeislove"	1:15
21.	"Amansloveislife_keepon"	3:19
22.	"Minding_my Business" (featuring Durand Bernarr and Rose Gold)	4:28
Total length:		37:57

Notes

- "dont be afraid" contains a sample of "Surrender" by Kut Klose.
- "do you" contains a sample of "Just Because I'm Wrong" by Gerald Levert.
- "howtokope" features additional vocals from Ebro Darden.
- "solivelife" features additional vocals from Anderson .Paak.
- "watchwhoukallyourhomie" features additional vocals from Meek Mill.
- "believeme" features additional vocals from Vodka.
- "amansloveislife_keepon" contains a sample of "Keep On" by Kut Klose.
