= Why Lawd? =

Studio album by NxWorries
- Released: June 7, 2024
- Studio: Stones Throw; Record One; Sick Vibes; BLE Compound
- Length: 44:10
- Label: Stones Throw
- Producer: Knxwledge

NxWorries chronology
Yes Lawd! Remixes (2017)	Why Lawd? (2024)

Alternate cover
- Cover by Rhymezlikedimez; only available with physical purchases

Singles from Why Lawd?
- 1. "Where I Go" Released: October 19, 2022; 2. "Daydreaming" Released: May 18, 2023; 3. "86Sentra" Released: April 3, 2024; 4. "FromHere" Released: May 14, 2024; 5. "WalkOnBy" Released: June 11, 2024

Why Lawd? is the second studio album by American neo soul duo NxWorries, which consists of vocalist Anderson .Paak and producer Knxwledge. It was released physically on June 7, 2024, by Stones Throw Records, and was digitally released a week later on June 14, 2024. The album won Best Progressive R&B Album at the 67th Annual Grammy Awards.

== Background ==
In October 2020, Anderson .Paak revealed that a new NxWorries album was upcoming. The album was officially announced on April 3, 2024, with an official visualizer for "86Sentra" being released the same day.

== Release and promotion ==
The album's first single, "Where I Go", featuring H.E.R., was released on October 19, 2022, alongside a music video. It was previously debuted at the Double Happiness Festival in December 2020. The second single, "Daydreaming", was released on May 18, 2023, alongside a music video recorded in Grand Theft Auto V. On April 3, 2024, the album was officially announced with the single "86Sentra". "FromHere", featuring Snoop Dogg and October London, was released on May 14, 2024, as the album's fourth single. The album released physically on June 7, 2024. The album's fifth single, "WalkOnBy" featuring Earl Sweatshirt and Rae Khalil, was released on June 11, 2024. It released digitally on June 14, 2024.

In May 2025, the duo announced their first tour together, the Why Lawd? Tour, in support of the album. The tour will be supported by Rae Khalil and is set to run from September to October 2025.

== Critical reception ==
Professional ratings
Aggregate scores
Source	Rating
Metacritic	77/100
Review scores
Source	Rating
AllMusic	4/5 stars
The Guardian	2/5 stars
Pitchfork	8.0/10
RapReviews	8.5/10
The Skinny	4/5 stars

According to the review aggregator Metacritic, Why Lawd? received "generally favorable reviews" based on a weighted average score of 77 out of 100 from 6 critic scores.

Writing for Variety, John Kennedy wrote that the album was an "intriguing listen" with a "level of candor" on themes such as survivor's guilt and emotional unavailability. Dylan Green of Pitchfork described the Knxwledge's production on the album as "some of the most breathtaking production of his career", describing it as "ornately constructed, each a treasure hunt for the tell that it's all made from tiny bits of other songs." AllMusic's Andy Kellman concluded his review stating: 'Paak's litany of woes -- "Roll the windows down, I hope the rain hides my tears"—ensure that his thunder is not stolen.' Stevie Chick's review for The Guardian was critical of the album's lyrics, writing that .Paak was an "unlikable narrator" and that his lyrics were "wildly switching moods between anger, self-pity and desperate horniness." Writing for The Skinny, Logan Walker stated that the album delivered "the sonic smoothness fans have come to expect."

=== Accolades ===
Publication	Accolade	Rank	Ref.
Billboard	The 50 Best Albums of 2024	31	
HuffPost	The Best Albums Of 2024	—N/a	
Okayplayer	The 50 Best Albums of 2024	—N/a	
Paste	The 100 Best Albums of 2024	82	
Uproxx	The Best Albums Of 2024	—N/a	

=== Industry awards ===
Awards and nominations for Why Lawd?
Year	Ceremony	Category	Result	Ref.
2025	Grammy Awards	Best Progressive R&B Album	Won	

== Track listing ==
Why Lawd? track listing
No.	Title	Writer(s)	Length
1.	"ThankU" (featuring Dave Chappelle)	Glen Earl Boothe Jr.; Dave Chappelle; Don Milnor; Jesse Murrah	0:50
2.	"86Sentra"	Brandon Anderson; Boothe	1:36
3.	"MoveOn"	Anderson; Boothe; Cassandra Monique Battle; Ann Hoon Chung; Nicholas Leon Race; Bryan James Sledge	2:47
4.	"KeepHer" (featuring Thundercat)	Anderson; Boothe; Stephen Lee Bruner; Chung	4:14
5.	"Distractions"	Anderson; Boothe	1:49
6.	"Lookin'"	Anderson; Boothe; Herbert Anthony Stevens	0:54
7.	"Where I Go" (featuring H.E.R.)	Anderson; Boothe; Maxx Moor; Gabriella Sarmiento Wilson	3:18
8.	"Daydreaming"	Anderson; Boothe; Stanley Clarke; George Duke; Jairus Lemuel-Jada Mozee; Race	3:01
9.	"FromHere" (featuring Snoop Dogg and October London)	Anderson; Boothe; Calvin Broadus; Jared Samuel Erskine	4:01
10.	"FallThru"	Anderson; Joe Bataan; Boothe	2:21
11.	"Battlefield"	Anderson; Boothe; Haley Reinhart; William Stewart	3:38
12.	"HereIAm"	Anderson; Boothe; Gregory Cook; Kathryn Thomas	1:34
13.	"OutTheWay" (featuring Rae Khalil)	Anderson; Boothe; Chung; David Conley; Bernard Jackson; Kenya Rae Johnson; David Townsend	3:26
14.	"SheUsed"	Gene Allan; Anderson; Boothe; Gary Knight	2:36
15.	"MoreOfIt"	Anderson; Boothe	1:12
16.	"NVR.RMX" (featuring Charlie Wilson)	Anderson; Boothe; Charles K. Wilson	1:18
17.	"DistantSpace" (featuring the Last Artful, Dodgr)	Anderson; Boothe; Alana Chenevert; John Sylvester Smythe	1:23
18.	"WalkOnBy" (featuring Earl Sweatshirt and Rae Khalil)	Anderson; Boothe; Johnson; Thebe Kgositsile; Aida Osman	3:47
19.	"EvnMore"	Boothe; Yuji Ohno	0:25
Total length:			44:10

Sample credits

- "ThankU" contains a sample of "Thank You Jesus" by Johnnie Wilder Jr.
- "Daydreaming" contains a sample of "You're Gonna Love It" by Stanley Clarke and George Duke.
- "FallThru" contains a sample of "Just One of Your Kisses" by Ralfi Pagan.
- "Battlefield" contains a sample of "Sitting in the Park" by the Ghost Squad.
- "HereIAm" contains a sample of "I'd Like to Stay" by People's Pleasure with Alive and Wild.
- "OutTheWay" contains a sample of "Let's Try Again" by Surface.
- "SheUsed" contains a sample of "She Calls Me Baby" by J Kelly & The Premiers.
- "DistantSpace" contains a sample of "Butterflies" by Smythe.
- "EvnMore" contains a sample of "Urban Shadow" by Yuji Ohno & Friends.

== Personnel ==
NxWorries

- Anderson .Paak – vocals on all tracks except "ThankU" and "EvnMore", additional drums on "MoveOn"
- Knxwledge – beats, production

Additional musicians

- Dave Chappelle – words on "ThankU"
- Ann One – background vocals on "MoveOn" and "KeepHer"
- Andra Day – background vocals on "MoveOn"
- BJ the Chicago Kid – background vocals on "MoveOn"
- Thundercat – vocals on "KeepHer"
- Ab-Soul – vocals on "Lookin'"
- José Ríos – lead guitar on "Where I Go" and "WalkOnBy"
- H.E.R. – vocals on "Where I Go"
- J.Mo – lead guitar on "Daydreaming"
- Snoop Dogg – vocals on "FromHere"
- October London – vocals on "FromHere"
- Haley Reinhart – background vocals on "Battlefield"
- Rae Khalil – vocals on "OutTheWay" and "WalkOnBy"
- Charlie Wilson – vocals on "NVR.RMX"
- Dodgr – background vocals on "DistantSpace"
- Leonard "Pudge" Tribbett – drums on "DistantSpace"
- Earl Sweatshirt – vocals on "WalkOnBy"
- Julia Rachelle – background vocals on "WalkOnBy"
- Gemma Castro – background vocals on "WalkOnBy"

Technical

- Dos Pueblos (Note: Dos Pueblos consists of Jhair "Jha" Lazo and Julio Ulloa) – mixing, engineering
- Mike Bozzi – mastering
- Bernie Grundman – mastering
- Shon "Lawon" Brooks – engineering on "FromHere"
- Frank Vasquez – engineering on "FromHere"
- October London – engineering on "FromHere"
- Gemma Castro – engineering assistance
- Collin Davis – engineering assistance
- Zumo Kollie – engineering assistance
- Jeffery "Champ" Massey – engineering assistance
- Jeff Jank, Israel Ramos – artwork

== Charts ==
Chart performance for Why Lawd?
Chart (2024)	Peak position
Australian Vinyl Albums (ARIA)	8
Belgian Albums (Ultratop Flanders)	113
Dutch Albums (Album Top 100)	68
Scottish Albums (OCC)	51
UK Album Downloads (OCC)	51
UK Albums Sales (OCC)	30
UK Independent Albums (OCC)	13
UK R&B Albums (OCC)	2
US Billboard 200	81
US Top R&B/Hip-Hop Albums (Billboard)	26
