= Ventura (Anderson .Paak album) =

Studio album by Anderson .Paak
- Released: April 12, 2019
- Studio: Chalice; OBE (Hollywood); Island Sound (Honolulu); PatchWerk (Atlanta); Record One (Los Angeles)
- Genre: R&B; soul; funk
- Length: 39:36
- Label: 12 Tone; Aftermath
- Producer: The Alchemist; Anderson .Paak; Callum and Kiefer; Dem Jointz; Fredwreck; the Free Nationals; Jairus "J. Mo" Mozee; Pharrell Williams; Pomo; Vicky Nguyen

Anderson .Paak chronology
Oxnard (2018)	Ventura (2019)	An Evening with Silk Sonic (2021)

Singles from Ventura
- 1. "King James" Released: March 15, 2019; 2. "Make It Better" Released: April 4, 2019

Ventura is the fourth studio album by American singer Anderson .Paak. It was released on April 12, 2019, by 12 Tone Music and Aftermath Entertainment. It features guest appearances from André 3000, Smokey Robinson, Lalah Hathaway, Jazmine Sullivan, Sonyae Elise, and Brandy, along with posthumous vocals from Nate Dogg.

Ventura was supported by two singles: "King James" and "Make It Better". The album received widespread acclaim and debuted at number four on the US Billboard 200. It is Paak's first US top 10 album. The album won Best R&B Album at the 2020 Grammy Awards.

== Background ==
In May 2018, Dr. Dre leaked the title to Paak's third album, Oxnard Ventura during an Instagram livestream. However, the title of his third album was later changed to Oxnard. Paak has stated in interviews that Dre let him have more freedom with the production on Ventura, following the more tightly produced Oxnard. In a March 2019 interview for Esquire, he said, "[Dre] let me have a lot of leeway on Ventura. He was like, it seems like you got it. I spread my wings on the production and on the writing and on these collaborations". The album was released on April 12, 2019, just six months after his last full-length album, Oxnard, which Paak wrote and recorded at the same time.

== Promotion ==
The album's lead single, "King James", was released on March 15, 2019. The song was produced by Callum and Kiefer. It was the 39th-best-performing single on the Tokio Hot 100 in 2019. The album's second single, "Make It Better" featuring Smokey Robinson, was released on April 4, 2019. The song was produced by Anderson .Paak, Fredwreck, and The Alchemist.

== Critical reception ==
Professional ratings
Aggregate scores
Source	Rating
AnyDecentMusic?	7.5/10
Metacritic	82/100
Review scores
Source	Rating
AllMusic	4/5 stars
Consequence	B+
Exclaim!	7/10
The Guardian	4/5 stars
The Independent	4/5 stars
The Line of Best Fit	9/10
NME	4/5 stars
Pitchfork	6.9/10
Rolling Stone	4/5 stars
Slant Magazine	4/5 stars

Ventura was met with widespread critical acclaim. At Metacritic, which assigns a normalized rating out of 100 to reviews from professional publications, the album received an average score of 82, based on 19 reviews. Aggregator AnyDecentMusic? gave it 7.5 out of 10, based on their assessment of the critical consensus.

Kitty Richardson of The Line of Best Fit gave a positive review, stating "With sumptuous harmonies and a live band locked in on every track, .Paak finds a sweet spot between throwback soul and the 21st Century dancefloor. He sounds like the best version of himself. ... An exceptional return to form". Will Hermes from Rolling Stone stated, "Paak's output is keeping pace with his ambition. But good as his records have been, this set included, you still get a sense that the best work still lay ahead". Alexis Petridis of The Guardian spoke on the album saying "Ventura sounds like the work of someone intent on fixing the flaws in its predecessor. Paak's tendency to supercharge the production for commercial appeal has been reined in. The sound centres around an appealingly stripped-down take on mid-70s Philly soul". Jack Shepherd of The Independent also praised the album saying "Rather than being an album of Oxnard offshoots, Ventura instead borrows heavily from .Paak's consistently brilliant 2016 record Malibu, itself a fresh slice of soulful funk". Jordan Bassett of NME called the album "a lush '70s soul-inflected record" commenting that "Last year's Oxnard referenced his childhood in the titular Los Angeles neighbourhood, while this latest album name-checks Ventura, the sun-kissed Californian coastal town in which, he's explained, he 'found [his] depth' as a teen".

Exclaim! critic Ryan B. Patrick said, "It's a super-charged R&B record, laced with throwback Motown/Philly grooves, that hits hard but fails to land a knockout blow. It seems to be a case of not being able to fully satisfy the hip-hop heads, the R&B fans and the amorphous genre-less Venn diagram in between". Sheldon Pearce of Pitchfork said, "This tune-up album, at the very least, restores the underlying feeling of his signature stuff. But there, too, lies its flaw: it's a hollow effort lacking in any real distinguishing characteristics. The album never becomes more than the sum of its sounds".

=== Year-end lists ===
Select year-end rankings of Ventura
Publication	List	Rank	Ref.
The A.V. Club	The 20 Best Albums of 2019	19	
Complex	Best Albums of 2019	47	
Consequence	Top 50 Albums of 2019	31	
NME	The 50 Best Albums of 2019	42	
Uproxx	The Best Albums of 2019	37	

=== Industry awards ===
Awards and nominations for Ventura
Year	Ceremony	Category	Result	Ref.
2020	Grammy Awards	Best R&B Album	Won	

== Commercial performance ==
Ventura debuted at number four on the Billboard 200, earning 55,000 album-equivalent units, of which 39,000 were pure album sales. It is Paak's first US top 10 album.

== Track listing ==
Ventura track listing
No.	Title	Writer(s)	Producer(s)	Length
1.	"Come Home" (featuring André 3000)	Brandon Anderson; André Benjamin; Jairus Mozee	Anderson .Paak; Jairus "J. Mo" Mozee	4:26
2.	"Make It Better" (featuring Smokey Robinson)	Anderson; Alaina Chenervert; Daniel Maman; Farid Nassar; Miguel Atwood-Ferguson; William Robinson	.Paak; Fredwreck; The Alchemist	3:39
3.	"Reachin' 2 Much" (featuring Lalah Hathaway)	Anderson; Dan Edinberg; Danny McKinnon; David Pimentel; Dwayne Abernathy Jr.; Kelsey González; Matthew Merisola; Vicky Nguyen	.Paak; Dem Jointz; Pomo; the Free Nationals; Nguyen	5:55
4.	"Winners Circle"	Anderson; González; M. Henderson; Nguyen	Nguyen; .Paak^{[a]}; González^{[a]}; Mell^{[a]}	3:29
5.	"Good Heels" (featuring Jazmine Sullivan)	Anderson; McKinnon; Pimentel; Jazmine Sullivan	.Paak; Pomo	1:38
6.	"Yada Yada"	Anderson; Bernard Edwards Jr.; Kiefer Shackelford; Merisola	Callum and Kiefer	3:27
7.	"King James"	Anderson; Alekos Syropoulos; Shackelford; Merisola	Callum and Kiefer	3:17
8.	"Chosen One" (featuring Sonyae Elise)	Anderson; Jose Rios; González; Ron Avant; Sonyae Elise; Tia Myrie	.Paak	4:05
9.	"Jet Black" (featuring Brandy)	Anderson; Brandy Norwood; Pimentel	Pomo	3:28
10.	"Twilight"	Anderson; Pharrell Williams	Williams	3:16
11.	"What Can We Do?" (featuring Nate Dogg)	Anderson; Nassar; Nathaniel Hale	Fredwreck	2:56
Total length:				39:36

Notes

- ^{^[a]} signifies an additional producer

Sample credits

- "Come Home" contains a sample from "Best One", written by Glen Boothe and Brandon Anderson, and performed by NxWorries.
- "Winners Circle" contains excerpts from the film, A Bronx Tale (1993), performed by Chazz Palminteri and Robert De Niro, courtesy of Universal Pictures.
- "Chosen One" contains a sample from "On The Level", written and performed by Mac DeMarco.

== Personnel ==
Credits adapted from Tidal.

Musicians

- Anderson .Paak – vocals (all tracks), production (1–3, 5, 8), additional production (4), drums (1, 3, 5, 7), percussion (1, 4), additional drums (11)
- André 3000 – featured artist (1)
- Smokey Robinson – featured artist (2)
- Lalah Hathaway – featured artist (3)
- Jazmine Sullivan – featured artist (5)
- Sonyae Elise – featured artist (8)
- Brandy – featured artist (9)
- Nate Dogg – featured artist (11)
- Adam Turchin – alto saxophone, tenor saxophone (11)
- Alekos Syropoulos – horn arrangement, horn, saxophone (7)
- BJ the Chicago Kid – background vocals (1)
- Callum Connor – production (6, 7), drums (3)
- Chris Gray – trumpet (11)
- Cocoa Sarai – background vocals (8)
- Dan Edinberg – bass (3)
- Danny McKinnon – guitar (3, 5, 9)
- Dem Jointz – production, background vocals (3)
- Durand Bernarr – additional vocals (4)
- Erick "Baby Jesus" Coomes – bass (11)
- Fredwreck – production, guitar (2, 11), keyboards (2), percussion (7), additional percussion (10), piano (11)
- J. P. Floyd – trombone (11)
- Jairus "J. Mo" Mozee – production, guitar, bass (1)
- Jhair "JHA" Lazo – strings (2)
- Jose Rios – bass (2), guitar (3, 8)
- Justin Dicenzo – strings (3)
- Kadhja Bonet – strings (1)
- Kelsey González – additional production (4), bass (2–4, 8, 11), guitar (3, 4)
- Kiefer – production (6, 7)
- Lola A. Romero – strings (2)
- Marcus Paul – horn (3, 10), additional horn (10)
- Maurice Brown – horn arrangement (1)
- Mell – additional production, drums (4)
- Miguel Atwood-Ferguson – strings (2, 3)
- Norelle – additional vocals (1, 4)
- Olivia Braga – background vocals (9)
- Paul Castelluzzo – guitar (7)
- Pharrell Williams – production, additional vocals (10)
- Pomo – production (3, 5, 9), additional keyboards (3), synth bass (5), bass, keyboards (9)
- Ron Avant – additional keyboards (3), keyboards, vocoder (8), piano (11)
- Sir – background vocals (1, 7, 8)
- Stalone – background vocals (3)
- Terrace Martin – horn (10)
- The Alchemist – production, drums (2)
- The Free Nationals – production (3)
- The Regiment – horn (1)
- Vicky Farewell Nguyen – production (3, 4), background vocals (1, 6), piano (1), additional keyboards (3)

Technical

- Dr. Dre – executive production, mixing (all tracks)
- Eric Gonzalez – assistant engineer (1, 3)
- Fredwreck – engineer (11)
- Focus... – mixing (all tracks)
- Jhair "JHA" Lazo – engineer (all tracks)
- Ken Oriole – engineer (1)
- Lola A. Romero – assistant engineer (1, 4, 5, 8, 10), mixing engineer (all tracks), engineer (2, 3, 11)
- Mike Larson – engineer (10)
- Quentin Gilkey – mixing engineer (11)
- Thomas Cullison – assistant engineer (10)
- Vic Luevanos – engineer (11)
- Zumo Kollie – assistant engineer (9)

== Charts ==
Chart performance for Ventura
Chart (2019)	Peak position
Australian Albums (ARIA)	19
Belgian Albums (Ultratop Flanders)	18
Belgian Albums (Ultratop Wallonia)	195
Canadian Albums (Billboard)	4
Danish Albums (Hitlisten)	18
Dutch Albums (Album Top 100)	7
French Albums (SNEP)	98
Irish Albums (IRMA)	42
Lithuanian Albums (AGATA)	11
French Albums (SNEP)	15
Norwegian Albums (VG-lista)	18
Swedish Albums (Sverigetopplistan)	35
Swiss Albums (Schweizer Hitparade)	34
UK Albums (OCC)	27
US Billboard 200	4
