= Link Up & Suede =

EP by NxWorries
- Released: December 4, 2015
- Recorded: 2015
- Genre: Hip-hop; R&B
- Length: 14:43
- Label: Stones Throw
- Producer: Knxwledge

NxWorries chronology
Link Up & Suede (2015)	Yes Lawd! (2016)

Singles from Link Up & Suede
- 1. "Suede" Released: February 10, 2015; 2. "Link Up" Released: December 1, 2015

Link Up & Suede is the debut EP by NxWorries, the Los Angeles–based duo of hip-hop producer Knxwledge and R&B vocalist Anderson .Paak. The EP was released on December 4, 2015, under Stones Throw Records, and was supported by two singles: "Suede", the breakthrough song which earned .Paak an invitation to Dr. Dre’s Compton sessions, and "Link Up", which premiered on Zane Lowe's Beats 1 radio show on December 1, 2015.

"Suede" was selected as one of NPR Music's "Favorite Songs of 2015". The EP also includes "Droogs", a Knxwledge remake of Anderson .Paak's "Drugs" taken from his Venice album, along with two instrumental bonus beats. Link Up & Suede serves as a precursor to the duo's full-length debut album, Yes Lawd!.

== Track listing ==
No.	Title	Writer(s)	Length
1.	"Anthrtime (Intro)"	Glen Earl Boothe	1:06
2.	"Link Up"	Boothe; Brandon Anderson	3:29
3.	"Datwhip (Interlude)"	Boothe; Anderson	1:24
4.	"Suede"	Boothe; Anderson; Gilbert Scott-Heron	2:57
5.	"Dntstop (Interlude)"	Boothe	0:43
6.	"Droogs"	Boothe; Anderson	5:04
Total length:			14:43

Physical version
No.	Title	Writer(s)	Length
1.	"Anthrtime (Intro)"	Boothe	1:06
2.	"Link Up"	Boothe; Anderson	3:29
3.	"Datwhip (Interlude)"	Boothe; Anderson	1:24
4.	"Suede"	Boothe; Anderson; Scott-Heron	2:57
5.	"Dntstop (Interlude)"	Boothe	0:43
6.	"Link Up" (Instrumental)	Boothe	3:32
7.	"Suede" (Instrumental)	Boothe; Scott-Heron
8.	"Droogs"	Boothe; Anderson	5:04

== Personnel ==
- Cole M.G.N. – mixing
- Eric Coleman – photography
- Dave Cooley – mastering
- Jeff Jank – design
- Knxwledge – producer
- Anderson Paak – vocalist and producer
- NxWorries – primary artist
- Dewey Saunders – illustrations
