= Suede (song) =

Single by NxWorries

from the album Link Up & Suede and Yes Lawd!
- Released: February 10, 2015
- Genre: Hip-hop; R&B
- Length: 2:57
- Label: Stones Throw
- Songwriters: Glen Earl Boothe; Brandon Paak Anderson; Gil Scott-Heron
- Producer: Knxwledge

NxWorries singles chronology
"Suede" (2015)	"Link Up" (2015)

Anderson .Paak singles chronology
"Miss Right" (2014)	"Suede" (2015)	"Make It Work" (2015)

Music video
- "Suede" on YouTube

"Suede" is a song by Los Angeles-based duo NxWorries, released as the lead single of their debut EP, Link Up & Suede. The song premiered on February 10, 2015, on Stones Throw Records' SoundCloud page and was made available for purchase at the Stones Throw Store and iTunes Store along with the EP's release on December 4, 2015. The song contains a slowed-down sample of "The Bottle" as written and performed by Gil Scott-Heron.

The song became a viral hit, with more than a million SoundCloud listens and nearly as many YouTube plays. Vocalist Anderson .Paak played the track to hip-hop mogul Dr. Dre during sessions of the latter's Compton album. Dr. Dre loved the track and it eventually resulted in .Paak featuring on six tracks on the album.

"Suede" was selected as one of NPR Music's "Favorite Songs of 2015" and made the list of the "Top 10 Most Viral Tracks" in the United Kingdom at no. 7 on Spotify.

== Music video ==
On August 25, 2015, the accompanying music video premiered on Stones Throw's YouTube. Directed by Calmatic, the video starts with Knxwledge in a vintage red convertible, parking in front of a house. Anderson .Paak is then seen jumping off the house's roof to escape a mystery pursuer chasing after him with a dog, and gets in the car. From there, the duo are cruising through the sunny streets of Southern California, picking up two stylish young ladies.

In another sequence, Paak boldly stares into the camera from the passenger seat and asks: "Who the fuck called me a player? / I ain't one of these young niggas out here sweatin' for a pay stub / I'm a coach / I'ma teach these bitches how to lay up!" Just to prove it, the scene cuts to a VHS skit of Paak schooling a young woman on the basketball court. Before the video ends, there is a preview of "Lyk Dis", a single from the duo's full-length debut album, Yes Lawd!.
