= Time (Free Nationals, Mac Miller and Kali Uchis song) =

2019 single by Free Nationals, Mac Miller and Kali Uchis

Single by Free Nationals, Mac Miller and Kali Uchis

from the album Free Nationals
- Released: June 12, 2019
- Recorded: 2018
- Length: 3:30
- Label: OBE; Empire
- Songwriters: Malcolm McCormick; Karly-Marina Loaiza
- Producer: Free Nationals

Free Nationals singles chronology
"Beauty & Essex" (2018)	"Time" (2019)	"On Sight" (2019)

Mac Miller singles chronology
"What's the Use?" (2018)	"Time" (2019)	"That's Life" (2019)

Kali Uchis singles chronology
"Just a Stranger" (2018)	"Time" (2019)	"Solita" (2019)

Music video
- "Time" on YouTube

"Time" is a song recorded by American R&B band Free Nationals, American rapper Mac Miller, and American singer Kali Uchis. It was released as a single from the Free Nationals's self-titled debut album on June 12, 2019. It is the first official posthumous release by Miller since his death on September 7, 2018.

== Music video ==
The music video for "Time" was published to the band's YouTube channel on August 1, 2019. The video was animated by BABEKÜHL, a Sydney-based creative studio.

== Charts ==
Chart (2019)	Peak position
New Zealand Hot Singles (RMNZ)	22

== Certifications ==
Certifications for "Time"
Region	Certification	Certified units/sales
New Zealand (RMNZ)	Gold	15,000^{‡}
^{‡} Sales+streaming figures based on certification alone.

== Kate Stewart version ==
"Time (Kate Stewart Remix)"

Single by Free Nationals, Kate Stewart and Kali Uchis
- Released: July 2, 2020
- Genre: Contemporary R&B
- Length: 2:32
- Label: OBE; Empire
- Songwriters: Kali Uchis; Kate Stewart
- Producer: Free Nationals

Kate Stewart singles chronology
"Spoiled Your Fun" (2020)	"Time (Kate Stewart Remix)" (2020)

A remixed version of the song with British singer-songwriter Kate Stewart was announced on her Twitter account 2 days before its official release. The remix of the single "Time", was released on July 2, 2020; Stewart shared with the link to the song in her SoundCloud account.
