= Free Nationals (album) =

Studio album by Free Nationals
- Released: December 13, 2019
- Genres: R&B; soul; funk; hip-hop
- Length: 41:11
- Labels: OBE; Empire

Singles from Free Nationals
- 1. "Beauty and Essex" Released: October 9, 2018; 2. "Time" Released: June 12, 2019; 3. "On Sight" Released: September 20, 2019; 4. "Eternal Light" Released: October 15, 2019; 5. "Shibuya" Released: November 8, 2019

Free Nationals is the debut album by American R&B band Free Nationals. It was released on December 13, 2019, through OBE and Empire Distribution. The album features guest appearances from Mac Miller, Kali Uchis, Daniel Caesar, Anderson .Paak, T.I., JID, and MIKNNA among others. It was nominated for Best Progressive R&B Album at the 63rd Annual Grammy Awards.

== Musical style ==
Free Nationals has been described as classic R&B, funk and soul with a modern twist, nodding to legends like Stevie Wonder and Parliament-Funkadelic.

== Recording and production ==
The album was produced by the four Free Nationals band members. The songs were run through a tape recorder to add analogue distortion and warmth, adding to the retro feel of the album. It was mixed by Callum Connor and Andrew Wuepper at The Crying Panther Studio, Los Angeles and mastered by Dave Kutch at The Mastering Palace, New York City.

== Release and promotion ==
=== Background ===
Free Nationals announced the album in early 2018 and it was expected to be released before 2019 however the release was delayed until December 2019. The band stated in a tweet: "The real reason it was delayed was because of our rigorous touring schedule", referring to touring with fellow musician Anderson .Paak. In the same tweet, the band confirmed that the release date would be December 13, 2019.

=== Singles ===
A total of five singles were released for the album throughout 2018 and 2019. The first single, 'Beauty & Essex' was released on October 9, 2018. 'Time' featuring Mac Miller and Kali Uchis was released on June 12, 2019. It was the first posthumous release from Mac Miller and reached number 22 on the Official New Zealand Music Chart. 'On Sight' was released on September 20, 2019, Eternal Light on October 15, 2019, and Shibuya on November 8, 2019.

=== Music videos ===
The music video for "Beauty & Essex", directed by Scott Lazer, was released on November 8, 2018.

The music video for "Time" was released on August 1, 2019. The colorful video was animated by BABEKÜHL, a Sydney-based creative studio.

== Artwork ==
The album's retro airbrush style artwork was created by Lexington based artist and musician Robert Beatty.

== Critical reception ==
Professional ratings
Aggregate scores
Source	Rating
AnyDecentMusic?	7.0/10
Metacritic	74/100
Review scores
Source	Rating
Exclaim	8/10
Q Magazine	8/10
Mojo	8/10
The Line of Best Fit	7/10
Pitchfork	6.4/10
NME	3/5 stars
The Observer (UK)	3/5 stars
Evening Standard	4/5 stars

Metacritic, which uses a weighted average, assigned a score of 74 out of 100 based on 7 critic's reviews, which indicates "generally favorable reviews". Q Magazine stated "Free Nationals say less about the band's identity than it does their taste, skill and curatorial clout--but that's still more than plenty". Mojo said "Free Nationals' blissed-out, woozy slow-jams make for a low-key triumph". NME also reviewed the album, stating "The Free Nationals' supreme musicianship is unquestionable, but they more often than not seem to require an outside presence leading from the front to really bring it all home".

== Accolades ==
Awards for Free Nationals
Year	Organization	Award	Result	Ref
2021	Grammy Awards	Best Progressive R&B Album	Nominated	

== Track listing ==
All tracks are written by José Rios, Kelsey Gonzales, and Matt Merisola, with others noted.

Free Nationals track listing
No.	Title	Writer(s)	Length
1.	"Obituaries" (featuring Shafiq Husayn)	Ron Avant; Husayn	2:21
2.	"Beauty & Essex" (featuring Daniel Caesar and Unknown Mortal Orchestra)	Ashton Simmonds; David Pimentel; Ruban Nielson	4:37
3.	"On Sight" (featuring JID, Kadhja Bonet and MIKNNA)	Destin Route; Michael Byun; Avant	4:09
4.	"Shibuya" (featuring Syd)	Avant; Syd Bennett	2:17
5.	"Apartment" (featuring Benny Sings)	Avant; Tim van Berkestijn	3:05
6.	"Gidget" (featuring Anderson .Paak and T.Nava)	Brandon Anderson; Avant	3:39
7.	"Rene" (featuring Callum Connor)	Avant; Byun	2:30
8.	"Time" (featuring Mac Miller and Kali Uchis)	Karly Loaiza; Malcolm McCormick; Avant	3:30
9.	"Cut Me a Break" (featuring T.I.)	Clifford Harris Jr; Avant	1:57
10.	"Eternal Light" (featuring Chronixx)	Jamar McNaughton; Avant	3:14
11.	"Oslo" (featuring Callum Connor and T.Nava)	Avant; Byun	3:34
12.	"Lester Diamond"	Avant	2:48
13.	"The Rivington" (featuring Conway, Westside Gunn and Joyce Wrice)	Alvin Worthy; Demond Price; Wrice; Avant	3:37
Total length:			41:11

== Personnel ==
Adapted from the album's liner notes and online sources.

Free Nationals

- Jose Rios
- Callum Connor
- Kelsey Gonzales
- Ron "T.Nava" Avant

Featured artists

- Mac Miller
- Anderson .Paak
- Kali Uchis
- Daniel Caesar
- MIKNNA
- Syd
- Chronixx
- Benny Sings
- Unknown Mortal Orchestra
- T.I.
- Shafiq Husayn
- Westside Gunn
- Conway the Machine
- Joyce Wrice

Other musicians

- Maurice Brown - Trumpet (track 13)
- Omar Dominick - Bass (track 7)
- Jonah Levine - Trombone (tracks 4 & 5)
- Chris Lowery - Trumpet (track 8)
- Wes Lowery - Trombone (track 8)
- Emil Martinez - Trumpet (tracks 4 & 5)
- Danny McKinnon - Guitar (tracks 2 & 10)
- Vicky Farewell Nguyen - Keyboards (track 10)
- Erwin Pierce - Saxophone (track 13)
- David Pimentel - Drum Programming, Keyboards (tracks 2, 10, 13)
- Aaron Shaw - Flute (track 8)

Production

- Dave Kutch - Mastering
- Andrew Wuepper - Mixing

Design

- Robert Beatty - Cover Art
- Anna-Marie Lopez - Photography

== Certifications ==
Certifications for Free Nationals
Region	Certification	Certified units/sales
New Zealand (RMNZ)	Gold	7,500^{‡}
^{‡} Sales+streaming figures based on certification alone.
