= Tezeta (disambiguation) =

Tezeta is a music genre in Ethiopia and Eritrea in ballad form.

Tezeta may also refer to:

- "Tezeta (Nostalgia)", a song by Mulatu Astatke
- "Tezeta", a song by King Gizzard & the Lizard Wizard from their 2017 album Sketches of Brunswick East
