= Going, Going, Gone =

"Going, going, gone!" is a phrase commonly used to close bidding in an auction chant.

Going, Going, Gone may also refer to:

- Going, Going, Gone (novel), a 2000 novel by Jack Womack
- Going Going Gone!, an off-price sporting goods retailer by Dick's Sporting Goods

== Film and television ==
- Going, Going, Gone (TV series), a 1990s BBC television series
- "Going, Going, Gone" (Bay City Blues), a 1984 television episode
- "Going Going Gone" (CSI: Miami), a 2006 television episode
- "Going, Going, Gone" (Grey's Anatomy), a 2012 television episode
- "Going, Going, Gone", a 1979 episode of the American series Wonder Woman
- Going! Going! Gone!, a 1919 short comedy film

== Music ==
- Going, Going, Gone (album), an album by Mild High Club
- "Going, Going, Gone" (Bob Dylan song), 1974
- "Going, Going, Gone" (Bryan White song), 1994, also recorded by Neal McCoy
- "Going, Going, Gone" (Lee Greenwood song), 1984
- "Going, Going, Gone" (Luke Combs song), 2022
- "Going, Going, Gone" (Maddie Poppe song), 2018
- "Going Going Gone", a song by Tim Finn from his 2011 album The View Is Worth the Climb
- "Going Going Gone", a song by Dannii Minogue from her 2007 album Unleashed
- "Going, Going, Gone", a song by Information Society from the album Peace and Love, Inc.
- "Goin' Goin' Gone", a song by Thrasher Shiver from the album Thrasher Shiver
- "Going, Going, Gone", a song by Stars, featuring Emily Haines, from the album Nightsongs
- "Going Going Gone", a song by Lucy Dacus from her album Home Video

== See also ==
- "Goin' Gone", a song by Kathy Mattea
