= At the Mall =

Studio album by Baron Zen
- Released: March 7, 2006
- Genres: Hip hop, Electronica
- Label: Stones Throw Records
- Producer: DJ Sweet Steve

Baron Zen chronology
At the Mall (2006)	At the Mall: Remixes (2007)

Professional ratings
Review scores
Source	Rating
AllMusic	3.5/5 stars
Prefix	(7/10)

At the Mall is the first album from one-man Hip hop/Disco/Electronica act Baron Zen, released on Stones Throw Records in 2006.

== Track listing ==
1. "Baron Zen Theme"
2. "No More"
3. "Walked in Line"
4. "Fuckin' Bored"
5. "Shoes"
6. "Turn Around"
7. "Night in Jail"
8. "Last Night"
9. "When I Hear Music"
10. "Gotta Get Rid of Rick"
11. "At the Mall"
12. "Money"
13. "Walking on Sunshine"
14. "Burn Rubber"
