= Peyton (musician) =

American musician (born 1997)

- Born: Peyton Booker; August 21, 1997 (age 28); Houston, Texas, U.S.
- Genres: R&B; Alternative; Pop
- Occupations: Artist, Singer, Singer-Songwriter
- Instrument: Vocals
- Years active: 2015–present
- Label: Stones Throw
- Website: itspeyton.com

Peyton Nicole Booker, known professionally as Peyton, is an American singer-songwriter from Houston, Texas.

== Early life ==
Peyton was born and raised in Houston, Texas. She began learning the violin at five and grew up singing in church every Sunday and performing in classical ensembles. Peyton's late grandmother, Theola Booker, was a formative inspiration who not only composed and arranged music for renowned gospel musician Reverend James Cleveland, of which she received a Grammy Award nomination for her work behind the scenes, but also taught piano for decades at Peyton's elementary school.

== Musical career ==
In 2015, Peyton collaborated with Steve Lacy of The Internet for the track ‘Verbs’, and in that same year she released her debut EP Roller Coaster. She soon after released the song ‘Sweet Honey’, which caught the ear of Peanut Butter Wolf, who signed Peyton to Stones Throw. The track was featured on season 3 of Issa Rae’s hit HBO series Insecure. In 2019, Peyton released her debut Stones Throw EP Reach Out.

In June 2021, Peyton released her first studio album on Stones Throw, PSA. The album was executively produced by Biako and includes producers Keys N Krates, Vicky Farewell, Julia Lewis, Chase of Nazareth, McClenney and Jay Anthony, as well as a guest appearance from rapper Brice Blanco. The album received favourable reviews from outlets such as Pitchfork, which described it as a "pensive and lighthearted account of the trials and delights of young adulthood... its sunny, carefree music harkening to the days of R&B as the soundtrack of coming of age", and on AllMusic, which described her as an "idiosyncratic creative force".

== Artistry ==
In an interview with OkayPlayer about her artistry, Peyton said, “I am told often that I am a strong lyricist, and that my voice is refreshing because of the sense of familiarity in my voice that gives a feeling of nostalgia with a different approach.” Peyton has musical roots in gospel, soul, jazz, classical, and folk. Her passion for contemporary electronic music, hip-hop and R&B is all blended into her music.

Peyton cites Erykah Badu, The Pharcyde, The Neptunes, N.E.R.D., Mew, The Cardigans, Grizzly Bear, Kanye West and the biggest of them all, Amel Larrieux, as her influences. In the interview with OkayPlayer, Peyton says “I have been a fan of her music for as long as I can remember. I would listen to her music a lot because my dad would play her music in the house and on car rides. Her music reminds me of home. She has a very angelic voice and sings with such conviction and passion that makes you really feel the message she’s giving”.

== Discography ==
=== Albums ===
Title	Album details
PSA	Released: July 23, 2021; Label: Stones Throw; Format: Digital download, vinyl
Au	Released: September 12, 2025; Label: Stones Throw; Format: Digital download, vinyl

=== EPs ===
List of EPs with selected album details
Title	Album details
Roller Coaster	Released: December 14, 2015; Label: Self-released; Format: Digital download
Peace in the Midst of a Storm	Released: November 16, 2016; Label: Self-released; Format: Digital download
Reach Out	Released: September 13, 2019; Label: Stones Throw; Format: Digital download, vinyl

=== Singles ===
List of Singles
Title	Album details
"Verbs" (with Steve Lacy)	Released: July 29, 2015; Label: Self-released; Format: Digital download
"Sweet Honey"	Released: June 1, 2016; Label: Self-released; Format: Digital download
"Poison Baby"	Released: July 5, 2017; Label: Self-released; Format: Digital download
"To Spare"	Released: July 9, 2019; Label: Stones Throw; Format: Digital download
"laylo/crazy4U"	Released: August 14, 2019; Label: Stones Throw; Format: Digital download
"Swag"	Released: December 2, 2020; Label: Stones Throw; Format: Digital download
"Let It Flow" (with Brice Blanco)	Released: May 19, 2021; Label: Stones Throw; Format: Digital download

=== Soundtracks ===
Title	Album details
Insecure - Season 3 (2018)	Production Company: HBO Entertainment; Tracks: "Sweet Honey" & "Lifeline"
