= Skiptracing (album) =

Studio album by Mild High Club
- Released: August 26, 2016
- Genre: Psychedelic pop
- Length: 30:21
- Language: English
- Label: Stones Throw
- Producer: Alexander John Brettin

Mild High Club chronology
Timeline (2015)	Skiptracing (2016)	Sketches of Brunswick East (2017)

Skiptracing is the second studio album by American psychedelic pop band Mild High Club. The album has received positive reviews from critics.

== Concept ==
According to band member Alexander Brettin, the album is a story arc about an Los Angeles detective, "attempting to trace the steps of the sound and the spirit of American music.".

== Artwork ==
The album artwork features the private investigator, with a cello on his back, searching for clues. The artwork was painted by Zack Goulet, who was a friend of Alex. According to Zack, the year later, him and Alex had a falling out over disagreements about president Donald Trump.

== Reception ==
According to the review aggregator Metacritic, Skiptracing received "generally favorable reviews" based on a weighted average score of 68 out of 100 from seven critic scores. Editors at AllMusic rated this album 3.5 out of 5 stars, with critic Paul Simpson writing that this album contains the "a welcoming brand of mellow, sun-soaked psychedelic pop" from 2015's Timeline, this work is "significantly more ambitious" for "a much fuller sound and a wider scope [that] takes more risks".

At Clash Music, Noveen Bajpai rated this release a 7 out of 10, writing that the results are "mixed", but "Mild High Club have broken ground and laid new foundations with their most nuanced and exploratory material to date". A B− came from Jeremy Zerbe of Consequence of Sound, who called this work "almost overwhelming in its downtempo feel-goodery", critiquing that the music "falls prey to its own strengths, offering more of the same low-key, summertime vibes but never ultimately building up to anything". At Exclaim!, Cosette Schulz rated Skiptracing an 8 out of 10, calling the work "a pleasant escape" with "a cinematic feel, tinged with 1970s hues, jazzier moments and brief psychedelic spells".

Pitchfork Media's Benjamin Schein rated Skiptracing a 6.8 out of 10, writing that the first three tracks are strongest, forming a "suite of tunes plays like a mini trashcan pop symphony", but going on to state that "the album loses steam in its second half, with an aimless instrumental and two 30 second interludes bookending the two most forgettable tunes". Christopher Laird of PopMatters gave Skiptracing a 5 out of 10, writing that "Skiptracing is the journey we get to take with Brettin and it’s a fine one overall . The tones are warm, the sequencing is great, and the songs are mostly solid." In Record Collector, this album received 4 out of 5 stars for "win[ning] the listener over within seconds" with music that is "truly lush, jazz-flecked and beautifully written" and comparable to The Beach Boys.

== Track listing ==
All songs written by Alexander Brettin.

1. "Skiptracing" – 3:40
2. "Homage" – 2:57
3. "Cary Me Back" – 3:53
4. "Tesselation" – 2:33
5. "Head Out" – 2:28
6. "Kokopelli" – 2:55
7. "¿Whodunit?" – 2:09
8. "Chasing My Tail" – 4:07
9. "Ceiling Zero" – 0:37
10. "Chapel Perilous" – 4:33
11. "Skiptracing (reprise)" – 0:33

== Personnel ==
Mild High Club

- Alexander John Brettin – performance, production

Additional personnel

- Ross Chait – drums on "Chasing My Tail"
- Renee Clark – vocals on "Skiptracing"
- Joe Genden – synthesizer on "¿Whodunit?"
- Zack Goulet – artwork
- Tom Hurlbut – saxophone on "Head Out"
- Spencer Jenich – synthesizer on "Chapel Perilous"
- Jason Kick – synthesizer on "¿Whodunit?", engineering
- Mike Kriebel – musical assistance
- Adam Lawrence – layout
- Dent May – choir on "Chapel Perilous"
- Matthew Mondanile – musical assistance
- Max Nitch – synthesizer on "¿Whodunit?", layout
- Mat Roberts – drums on "Homage", "Cary Me Back", "Tesselation", "Head Out", "¿Whodunit?", "Chasing My Tail", "Ceiling Zero", and "Chapel Perilous"; bongos on "Skiptracing"; synthesizer on "¿Whodunit?"
- Simi Sohota – hand claps on "Ceiling Zero"
- Timothy Stollenwerk – mastering at Record Technology Incorporated – 263101
- Jarvis Taveniere – vocals on "Skiptracing" and "Homage", mixing, editing
- Jake Viator – mixing on "Chasing My Tail"
- Noam Wallenberg – drum programming on "Cary Me Back" and "Tesselation", mixing on "Ceiling Zero"
- Brian Wakefield – vocals on "Chasing My Tail"

== See also ==
- List of 2016 albums
