= Timeline (Mild High Club album) =

Studio album by Mild High Club
- Released: September 18, 2015
- Recorded: 2012–2015
- Studios: At home in Baltimore, Chicago, and Los Angeles
- Genre: Psychedelic pop
- Length: 28:50
- Language: English
- Label: Circle Star
- Producer: Alexander Brettin

Mild High Club chronology
Timeline (2015)	Skiptracing (2016)

Timeline is the debut studio album by American psychedelic pop band Mild High Club. It was released on September 18, 2015, on the Stones Throw Records imprint, Circle Star.

== Reception ==
According to the review aggregator Metacritic, Timeline received "generally favorable reviews" based on a weighted average score of 71 out of 100 from five critic scores. Editors at AllMusic rated this album 3.5 out of 5 stars, with critic Paul Simpson writing "Mild High Club doesn't try too hard and avoids indulging in cloying weirdness, resulting in an enjoyable, naturally flowing album". Priya Elan of Mojo rated this release 4 out of 5 stars, calling it "a thick trance of lysergic pop" that is "rather good". Jonah Bromwich of Pitchfork scored Timeline a 6.3 out of 10, characterizing it as "a pretty strong release for a brand new imprint to build on" and criticizing the music's reference points for being too obvious.

== Track listing ==
All songs written by Alexander Brettin, except where noted

1. "Club Intro" (Kyle Crager) – 3:05
2. "Windowpane" – 3:57
3. "Note to Self" – 2:20
4. "You and Me" – 3:28
5. "Undeniable" – 2:24
6. "Timeline" – 3:39
7. "Rollercoaster Baby" – 2:09
8. "Elegy" – 2:52
9. "Weeping Willow" – 2:16
10. "The Chat" – 2:40

== Personnel ==
Mild High Club

- Alexander Brettin – instrumentation, vocals, engineering, production

Additional personnel

- Andrew Burt – conducting on "Weeping Willow"
- Clay Hickson – cover art
- Matthew McQueen – mastering
- Natalie Mering – vocals on "The Chat"
- Maxwell Nitch – bass guitar and shaker on "Rollercoaster Baby"
- Will Pesta – collage, design, layout
- Ariel Pink – vocals on "The Chat"
- Mat Roberts – drums on "Club Intro"

== See also ==
- List of 2015 albums
