= Going, Going, Gone (album) =

Going, Going Gone

Studio album by Mild High Club
- Released: September 17, 2021
- Genre: Psychedelic pop
- Length: 29:38
- Language: English
- Label: Stones Throw
- Producers: Alexander Brettin; Vicky Nguyen

Mild High Club chronology
| Sketches of Brunswick East (2017) | Going, Going Gone (2021) |

Going, Going Gone is the fourth studio album by American psychedelic pop band Mild High Club. The album has received positive reviews from critics.

== Reception ==
Editors at AnyDecentMusic? scored this album a 6.9 out of 10, aggregating five reviews. According to the review aggregator Metacritic, Going, Going, Gone received "generally favorable reviews" based on a weighted average score of 71 out of 100 from four critic scores.

Editors at AllMusic rated this album 4 out of 5 stars, with critic Fred Thomas writing this album is "fun, mischievous, and wildly enjoyable" and "reaches new levels of clarity and composition for Mild High Club without losing any of the damaged magic that made earlier albums such interesting puzzles". Writing for Clash Music, Joe Rivers rated this work an 8 out of 10, praising the production: "it’s a tricky balance though – a strict producer may have made 'Going Going Gone' a more streamlined affair but would also likely have smoothed away the idiosyncratic edges that make Mild High Club so compelling". Ross Horton of The Line of Best Fit called this release "both fresh and rewarding" and "a varied, but still stylistically consistent and wonderfully accessible album"; he scored it an 8 out of 10. Piers Martin of Uncut rated Going, Going, Gone a 5 out of 10, stating that it "still possesses a certain screwball charm... but too often sounds like smug pastiche".

== Track listing ==
All songs written by Alexander Brettin and Vicky Nguyen, except where noted

1. "Kluges I" – 1:48
2. "Dionysian State" (Brettin) – 3:04
3. "Trash Heap" – 1:16
4. "Taste Tomorrow" – 2:21
5. "A New High" (Ary Barroso, Brettin, Nguyen, and Samira Winter) – 2:47
6. "It’s Over Again" – 2:07
7. "Kluges II" – 2:50
8. "I Don’t Mind the Wait" (Brettin) – 3:02
9. "Dawn Patrol" (Brettin, Nguyen, and Matthew Roberts) – 1:34
10. "Waving" (Brettin) – 4:20
11. "Me Myself and Dollar Hell" (Brettin) – 3:00
12. "Holding On to Me" (Brettin) – 1:29

== Personnel ==
Mild High Club

- Alexander Brettin – performance, arrangement, engineering, production, design, logo, artwork

Additional personnel

- Vicky "Farewell" Nguyen – production, vocals, bass guitar, Fender Rhodes, electric piano, grand piano, synthesizer, Wurlitzer, CS-70, CS-80, electro-acoustic piano
- Matthew Roberts – drums (8), vocals (11)
- W. Miller – trumpet (1)
- Nelson Devereaux – tenor saxophone (2)
- Woody Goss – baby grand piano (2)
- Pomo – drums (2)
- Keifer Shackleford – Wurlitzer (2)
- Glen Boothe – drums (4)
- Samira Winter – vocals (5)
- Pam Fleming – trumpet (10)
- Cocoa Sarai – vocals (10)
- Mac DeMarco – additional vocal engineering (2)
- N. Wallenberg – piano engineering (2)
- J. Viator – drum engineering (8)
- Eric Lau – mixing, special effects (8)
- Matt Colton – mastering
- Robert "Hot Rob" Williams – engineering
- Wavy i.d. – artwork, design

== See also ==
- List of 2021 albums
