= Mild High Club =

American psychedelic band

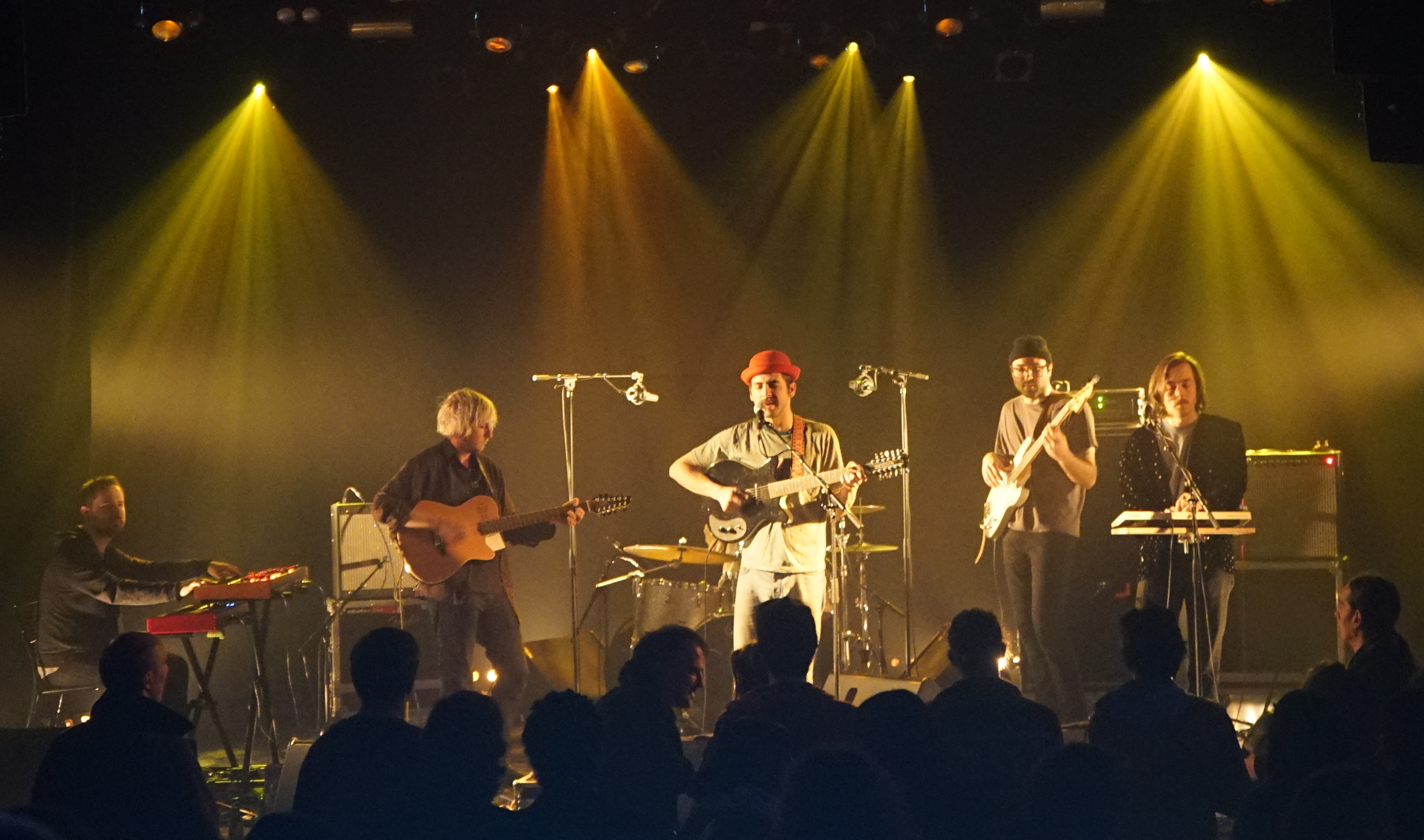
- Mild High Club performing in 2016

Background information
- Origin: Chicago, Illinois, U.S.
- Genres: Psychedelic pop, dream pop
- Years active: 2013–present
- Label: Stones Throw Records
- Members: Alexander Brettin

Mild High Club is an American psychedelic pop group, led by the musician Alexander Brettin. The group published 3 albums: Timeline (2015), Skiptracing (2016), and Going, Going, Gone (2021), along with their collaborative album with King Gizzard & the Lizard Wizard, Sketches of Brunswick East (2017).

== History ==
Brettin grew up in the Midwest, playing flute in his school band. He majored in jazz studies at Columbia College in Chicago, and started Mild High Club in 2013. Brettin worked on Mild High Club's first album, Timeline, for almost three years until its release in 2015.

His sophomore LP, Skiptracing, was released in 2016. Pitchfork reviewed the album, stating Skiptracing is an improvement from Timeline, where "a more confident artist emerges with a fuller vision and voice." In 2017, Brettin was featured on the Tyler, the Creator song "Pothole", off of his 2017 album Flower Boy. That same year, Brettin worked with the band King Gizzard & the Lizard Wizard to create their collaborative effort, Sketches of Brunswick East, which was released on August 18, 2017. Two years later, he performed vocals on another Tyler, the Creator song, Gone, Gone / Thank You, which was featured on his 2019 album Igor.

On July 27, 2021, after nearly five years of inactivity, Mild High Club's new album was announced, titled Going, Going, Gone. This announcement was accompanied by a single from said album, "Me Myself and Dollar Hell". It was released on September 17, 2021. "Homage", from the album Skiptracing, was certified Gold by the RIAA in 2022.

== Discography ==
=== Studio albums ===
List of albums, with selected details and peak chart positions
Title	Album details	Peak chart positions				
Title	Album details	AUS	BEL (WA)	NDL Vinyl	UK Indie	US Indie
Timeline	Released: September 18, 2015; Label: Circle Star; Format: Digital download, Streaming, CD, LP	─	─	─	─	─
Skiptracing	Released: August 26, 2016; Label: Stones Throw; Format: Digital download, streaming, LP, CD	─	─	─	─	─
Sketches of Brunswick East (with King Gizzard & the Lizard Wizard)	Released: August 18, 2017; Label: Flightless, ATO, Heavenly Recordings; Format: Digital download, streaming, CD, LP, cassette	4	183	14	21	29
Going, Going, Gone	Released: September 17, 2021; Label: Stones Throw; Format: Digital download, streaming, LP, CD	─	─	─	─	─

=== Other charted and certified songs ===
List of albums, with selected details and peak chart positions
Title	Year	Peak chart positions	Certifications	Album
Title	Year	UK Phy	Certifications	Album
"Homage"	2016	─	RIAA: Gold	Skiptracing
"Rolling Stoned"	2017	60		Sketches of Brunswick East
