= Sketches of Brunswick East =

Studio album by King Gizzard & the Lizard Wizard with Mild High Club
- Released: 18 August 2017
- Studios: Flightless HQ, East Brunswick
- Genres: Psychedelic rock; jazz fusion; psychedelic pop; soft rock
- Length: 37:20
- Labels: Flightless; ATO; Heavenly
- Producer: Stu Mackenzie

King Gizzard & the Lizard Wizard chronology
Murder of the Universe (2017)	Sketches of Brunswick East (2017)	Polygondwanaland (2017)

Mild High Club chronology
Skiptracing (2016)	Sketches of Brunswick East (2017)	Going, Going, Gone (2021)

Sketches of Brunswick East is a collaborative studio album by Australian psychedelic rock band King Gizzard & the Lizard Wizard, and psychedelic pop group Mild High Club. (Note: It is considered the eleventh album by King Gizzard & the Lizard Wizard and the third album by Mild High Club.) The title is a reference to the Melbourne suburb of Brunswick East and Miles Davis' 1960 LP Sketches of Spain, which inspired the album's jazz-oriented sound. It was released on 18 August 2017, by Flightless in Australia, ATO Records in the United States, and Heavenly Recordings in the United Kingdom. It is the third of five albums released by King Gizzard & the Lizard Wizard in 2017.

The album is a collaboration with Mild High Club member Alex Brettin, and is prominently jazz-based.

It was nominated for Best Jazz Album at the ARIA Music Awards of 2017.

== Background and conception ==
The album was conceived just after the release of Flying Microtonal Banana and the completion of Murder of the Universe, the band's first and second releases in 2017. At that point, ideas for the next three albums were discussed, with one (presumably Sketches of Brunswick East) said to be in a "state of coming together," while the other two were "sort of distant at the moment."

Stu Mackenzie stated in an interview that the collaboration with Mild High Club came about because Alex Brettin, the sole member of the band, played at King Gizzard's own Gizzfest in December 2016. Afterward, Brettin stayed at Mackenzie's house for a few weeks, during which they came up with ideas that he has since described as "really, really vague." The two recorded a handful of iPhone voice memos to share with each other, which they ended up calling sketches: hence the album title. Mackenzie later stated that the album was recorded in three weeks.

The album's title was leaked in the Heavenly Recordings album biography for Murder of the Universe. The title alludes to Miles Davis' Sketches of Spain as a musical influence.

"Mostly they were just a chord progression or some melodic part with a chord thing underneath it. It was just simple stuff. They really were just jump off points, and when we finally got together, we sort of fleshed these songs out together."

— Stu Mackenzie

The track "Rolling Stoned" was first shown in a live performance by the Mild High Club featuring Stu Mackenzie almost two years before this album was even known to exist. The song was taken directly off a segment from the song "The Chat", which appears in Mild High Club's first album Timeline.

The album was first played in its entirety on 18 August 2017, on a Facebook live stream. The album was then available for purchase an hour after the start of the stream.

== Genre ==
The album has been described as psychedelic rock, jazz fusion, psychedelic pop and soft rock.

== Reception ==
Professional ratings
Aggregate scores
Source	Rating
Metacritic	79/100
Review scores
Source	Rating
AllMusic	4/5 stars
Clash	8/10
Loud and Quiet	7/10
Pitchfork	7.5/10
Record Collector	4/5 stars

Sketches of Brunswick East was generally well received by professional music critics upon its initial release. In a four out of five star review for AllMusic, writer Tim Sendra claimed "It's fun to hear Gizzard being reshaped by Brettin's soft rock wizardry, and in the process making their third album of the year the most listenable so far. Conversely, working with the Australian wildmen gives Brettin's work an unpredictable nature not found on Mild High Club albums. This mutual benefaction means Sketches of Brunswick East is a collaboration that works wonders for both sides and will also make fans of both groups very happy." Pitchfork Contributor Saby Reyes-Kulkarni also felt the collaboration between both bands was a success, stating "Brunswick East amounts to way more than just a hybrid of two signature styles, or even a mere consolidation of each party’s respective strengths. When Brettin forays into 1970s AM tropes on his own, he can come off as if he’s being ironic, the line between sincere homage and smirking ridicule as hard to gauge as the commentary on, say, a podcast about yacht-rock. But when working around Brettin’s ideas, Mackenzie and his bandmates never linger too long in any one genre. As a result, the songs on Brunswick East have an endearing mutant-like quality about them that, for the most part, prevents them from turning into revivalist clichés."

== Track listing ==
Track listing adapted from King Gizzard & The Lizard Wizard's Bandcamp listing of the album.

Vinyl releases have tracks 1–7 on Side A, and tracks 8–13 on Side B.

No.	Title	Writer(s)	Length
1.	"Sketches of Brunswick East I"	Stu Mackenzie; Alex Brettin	1:20
2.	"Countdown"	Mackenzie; Brettin; Michael Cavanagh	3:22
3.	"D-Day"	Mackenzie	1:38
4.	"Tezeta"	Joey Walker	3:30
5.	"Cranes, Planes, Migraines"	Walker; Mackenzie	1:15
6.	"The Spider and Me"	Mackenzie; Brettin	3:16
7.	"Sketches of Brunswick East II"	Mackenzie; Brettin	3:26
8.	"Dusk to Dawn on Lygon Street"	Cook Craig; Mackenzie; Brettin	3:02
9.	"The Book"	Mackenzie	5:00
10.	"A Journey to (S)hell"	Mackenzie; Walker	2:16
11.	"Rolling Stoned"	Brettin	3:18
12.	"You Can Be Your Silhouette"	Mackenzie	3:48
13.	"Sketches of Brunswick East III"	Mackenzie; Brettin	2:08
Total length:			37:20

== Personnel ==
Credits for Sketches of Brunswick East adapted from liner notes.

King Gizzard & the Lizard Wizard

- Stu Mackenzie – bass guitar (tracks 1, 4, 7, 8, 13), electric piano (tracks 1, 7), flute (tracks 1, 4, 7, 11, 13), wah-wah guitar (tracks 2, 6, 11, 12), vocals (tracks 2, 3, 6, 9, 12), mellotron (tracks 2, 3, 5, 6, 8, 9, 13), microtonal guitar (track 3), acoustic guitar (tracks 4, 12), glass marimbas (track 5), microtonal organ (track 9), synthesizers (tracks 10, 11), piano (track 11), electric guitar (track 13); recording, mixing (tracks 1, 3–13), production
- Michael Cavanagh – drum kit 1 (tracks 1–13), snare brushes (tracks 1, 8), maracas (tracks 1, 7, 11, 13), floor toms (tracks 1, 3, 7, 9, 13), vibraslap (tracks 1, 8), bongos (tracks 1–5, 7–9, 11, 13), drum kit 2 (tracks 2, 3, 5, 6, 7, 9–13), tambourine (tracks 3, 9), cowbell (tracks 4, 5, 9)
- Cook Craig – electric guitar (tracks 1, 4, 5, 8, 9), fretless bass guitar (tracks 8, 13), vocals (track 8), synthesizers (track 8), bass guitar (track 11); additional overdubbing
- Lucas Harwood – mellotron (tracks 2, 6), electric piano (tracks 2, 4, 6, 9), piano (track 11); additional overdubbing
- Joey Walker – microtonal bass guitar (track 3), shaker (tracks 3, 4), glass marimbas (track 4), acoustic guitar (track 4), synthesizers (tracks 4, 5), vocals (track 4), electric guitar (track 4), bass guitar (tracks 5, 6, 9, 10), omnichord (track 11), piano (track 11), bongos (track 12), güiro (track 12); additional overdubbing
- Eric Moore – drum kit 2 (track 4)
- Ambrose Kenny-Smith – vocals (track 6), harmonica (tracks 10–12)

Mild High Club

- Alex Brettin – acoustic piano (track 1), bass guitar (tracks 2, 8, 12), electric piano (tracks 2, 6–8), synthesizers (tracks 2, 5, 7, 9), microtonal synthesizers (tracks 3, 5), optigan (tracks 3, 7), organ (tracks 4, 12), electronic drum kit (track 7), electric guitar (tracks 8, 10, 13); additional overdubbing, mixing (track 2)
- Andrew Burt – guitar (track 11)

Additional personnel

- Joseph Carra – mastering
- Jason Galea – artwork and layout
- Jamie Wdziekonski – photography

== Charts ==
=== Weekly ===
Chart (2017)	Peak position
Australian Albums (ARIA)	4
Australian Jazz and Blues Albums (ARIA)	1
Belgian Albums (Ultratop Wallonia)	183
Dutch Vinyl Albums (Vinyl 33)	14
New Zealand Heatseeker Albums (RMNZ)	9
United Kingdom Independent Albums (Official Charts Company)	21
US Heatseekers Albums (Billboard)	7
US Independent Albums (Billboard)	29
US Rock Albums Sales (Billboard)	39

=== Year-end ===
Chart (2017)	Rank
Australian Jazz and Blues Albums (ARIA)	6
