= Yes Lawd! =

Studio album by NxWorries
- Released: October 21, 2016
- Genre: R&B; hip-hop; funk; neo soul
- Length: 48:50
- Label: Stones Throw
- Producer: Knxwledge

NxWorries chronology
Link Up & Suede (2015)	Yes Lawd! (2016)	Yes Lawd! Remixes (2017)

Singles from Yes Lawd!
- 1. "Suede" Released: February 10, 2015; 2. "Link Up" Released: December 4, 2015; 3. "Lyk Dis" Released: September 19, 2016; 4. "Get Bigger / Do U Luv" Released: October 6, 2016

Yes Lawd! is the debut studio album by American neo soul duo NxWorries, which consists of vocalist Anderson .Paak and producer Knxwledge. It was released on October 21, 2016, by Stones Throw Records. It is supported by four singles, "Suede", "Link Up", "Lyk Dis", and "Get Bigger / Do U Luv".

== Release and promotion ==
On June 19, 2016, member Anderson .Paak confirmed that NxWorries' debut studio album is finished and set for release. On July 25, 2016, Paak's manager, Adrian Miller, confirmed that the album was to be titled Yes Lawd!. On September 19, 2016, the third single to NxWorries' debut studio album "Lyk Dis" was released, along with the track listing and release date for the album. On October 14, 2016, the duo released the album a week early for streaming on Apple Music.

== Critical reception ==
Professional ratings
Aggregate scores
Source	Rating
AnyDecentMusic?	7.7/10
Metacritic	80/100
Review scores
Source	Rating
AllMusic	3.5/5 stars
The Guardian	4/5 stars
The Irish Times	4/5 stars
Mojo	3/5 stars
NME	4/5 stars
The Observer	5/5 stars
Pitchfork	8.2/10
Record Collector	4/5 stars
Uncut	8/10
XXL	4/5

Yes Lawd! received generally favorable reviews. At Metacritic, which assigns a normalized rating out of 100 to reviews from mainstream publications, it received an average score of 80, based on 22 reviews. NME magazine's Jordan Bassett hailed it as "a sprawling, languid affair, running to 19 tracks of soulful hip-hop", while Jim Carroll of The Irish Times called it "an all-beats-blazing set of the funk". It was deemed an "R&B lover and millennial must-have" by Vibe, and Rolling Stone named it the 15th best R&B album of 2016. Robert Christgau gave the album a three-star honorable mention in his column for Vice, indicating "an enjoyable effort consumers attuned to its overriding aesthetic or individual vision may well treasure". He cited "Another Time", "Lyk Dis", and "Fkku" as highlights while calling Anderson .Paak a "love man [who] projects [a] minimum modicum of empathy with his salable burr yet somehow sounds cuddly even so". Marshall Gu from PopMatters was less enthusiastic, writing that the album "wants to be a neo-soul version of Madvillain or The Unseen or Donuts, that is, a stoner's dream collection of fragments of songs, less focused on hooks and more focused on sounds".

== Track listing ==
Credits adapted from BMI.

All tracks produced by Knxwledge.

No.	Title	Writer(s)	Length
1.	"Intro"	Brandon Anderson; Glen Boothe	0:48
2.	"Livvin"	Anderson; Boothe; Jorge Amiden; Sergio Hinds	2:45
3.	"Wngs"	Anderson; Boothe	1:36
4.	"Best One"	Anderson; Boothe	3:14
5.	"What More Can I Say"	Anderson; Boothe	2:36
6.	"Kutless"	Anderson; Boothe	2:07
7.	"Lyk Dis"	Anderson; Boothe	2:30
8.	"Can't Stop"	Anderson; Boothe	2:01
9.	"Get Bigger / Do U Luv"	Anderson; Boothe	4:03
10.	"Khadijah"	Anderson; Boothe	2:02
11.	"H.A.N."	Anderson; Boothe	2:49
12.	"Scared Money"	Anderson; Boothe; Johnny Kemp; Mauro Malavasi	2:57
13.	"Suede"	Anderson; Boothe; Gil Scott-Heron	2:54
14.	"Starlite"	Anderson; Boothe	3:23
15.	"Sidepiece"	Anderson; Boothe	3:46
16.	"Jodi"	Anderson; Boothe	1:09
17.	"Link Up"	Anderson; Boothe	3:31
18.	"Another Time"	Anderson; Boothe	2:27
19.	"Fkku"	Anderson; Boothe	2:11
Total length:			48:50

Sample credits

- "Livvin" contains samples of "Tributo Ao Sorriso", written by Alen Terra, Yan Guest, Jorge Amiden, and Luiz Junior, and performed by Karma.
- "Wngs" contains samples of "Ghetto Money", written by Linda Creed and Thom Bell, and performed by Ahmad Jamal.
- "Best One" contains samples of "Lord You're My Everything", written by Thomas Whitfield and performed by the Thomas Whitfield Company; and samples of the film The Players Club.
- "What More Can I Say" contains samples of "What More Can I Say", written by Bradley Bobo, Clifford Curry, Santos Domínguez, and Terry Long, and performed by The Notations; samples of "Good to Get Away", written and performed by Brenda Nicholas and Philip Nicholas; and samples of "Nights Like This", written by Jesse Johnson and Keith Lewis, and performed by After 7.
- "Kutless" contains samples of "Lady", written and performed by Gino Vannelli.
- "Lyk Dis" contains samples of "Mr. Me, Mrs. You", written by H. B. Barnum and Robert Young, and performed by Creme d'Cocoa; and contains samples of "Ebony Woman", written by Morris Bailey and performed by Harold Melvin & the Blue Notes.
- "Can't Stop" contains samples of "I Think My Heart Is Telling", written by John H. Fitch Jr. and Reuben Cross, and performed by Evelyn "Champagne" King; and samples of the television series Rick and Morty.
- "Get Bigger / Do U Luv" contains samples of "The Love You Gave to Me", written by Greg Adams and Webster Lewis, and performed by Webster Lewis; samples of "In Summertime", written and performed by Ronnie McNeir; and samples of "Pussy", written by Shawn Carter, Robert Kelly, and Devin Copeland, and performed by Jay Z and R. Kelly featuring Devin the Dude.
- "H.A.N." samples the film The Players Club.
- "Scared Money" contains samples of "(I Could Never Say) It's Over", written by Johnny Kemp and Mauro Malavasi and performed by B. B. & Q. Band; and interpolations of "Midnight", written by Ali Muhammad, Jonathan Davis, and Malik Taylor, and performed by A Tribe Called Quest featuring Raphael Wiggins.
- "Suede" contains samples of "The Bottle", written by Gil Scott-Heron and performed by Scott-Heron and Brian Jackson.
- "Starlite" contains samples of "God Is So Good to Me", written by Clyde G. Carter and performed by Gwen Carter.
- "Jodi" contains samples of the "Funky Bottoms" titled episode from the Kung Faux television series.
- "Sidepiece" contains an interpolation of "Won't Do", written and performed by J Dilla.
- "Another Time" contains samples of "Bless You With My Love", written by Barbara J. Trotter and performed by Heaven Sent & Ecstasy; and samples of "Your Love", written by Kenni Ski, Allen Anthony, and Shawn Carter, and performed by Christión and Jay Z.
- "Fkku" contains samples of "Absolutely Beautiful", written and performed by Eddie Robinson; and samples of the video "Dear person that pissed me off..." by Krissychula.

== Charts ==
Chart (2016)	Peak position
Australian Albums (ARIA)	48
Belgian Albums (Ultratop Flanders)	63
Dutch Albums (Album Top 100)	82
New Zealand Heatseekers Albums (RMNZ)	1
Swiss Albums (Schweizer Hitparade)	97
US Billboard 200	59
US Top R&B/Hip-Hop Albums (Billboard)	3

== Bibliography ==
- Christgau, Robert (2000). Christgau's Consumer Guide: Albums of the '90s. Macmillan. ISBN 0312245602.
- Christgau, Robert (March 3, 2017). "On Syd's Depth and Resonance: Expert Witness with Robert Christgau". Vice.
