= Baron Zen =

American musician

Baron Zen is a music project by Sweet Steve. His recording career as Baron Zen started back in 1988, collected in At the Mall. Baron Zen is DIY music that wears its pop influence on its sleeve: covers of Joy Division, Gap Band, Katrina and the Waves, and high-energy disco classic “When I Hear Music” by Debbie Deb play alongside Sweet Steve’s originals.

At the Mall was followed up by the At the Mall: Remixes album in 2007 featuring remixes by the likes of Peanut Butter Wolf ("At the Mall"), dam-funk ("Burn Rubber"), James Pants ("Gotta Get Ridda Rick"), Madlib, Arabian Prince, Tekblazer, M-80, and J.Roc, among others.

Steve then re-connected with Tekblazer for Baron Zen’s Rhythm Trax Vol. 3 in January 2009, the third installment of Stones Throw’s DJ Friendly Rhythm Trax Series (preceded by James Pants and DJ Romes), and the follow-up to his early '90s four-track post-punk masterpiece, At The Mall. On Vol. 3, Baron Zen departs from his garage band roots summoning the spiritual essence of early '80s electro pioneers such as Alexander Robotnik and Ryuichi Sakamoto. The soundscapes of this Rhythm Trax contribution satisfy the need for synth-drenched funk while maintaining a murky atmosphere intended to move even the haughtiest New Wave revivalist. M-80 co-produced three tracks, as well.

Baron Zen released a six-track single in summer 2009, produced by Sweet Steve and Tekblazer. "Strange Woman's Room" features San Jose's Dave Dub on vocals and includes a James Pants remix version. The B-side "Talk to Me" features a remix version by Peanut Butter Wolf.

Baron Zen and Tekblazer again teamed up for the electro-funky, synth-laden rap sound of "Electrik Surgery" (2011), the vocal follow-up to their "Rhythm Trax" LP. This seven-track EP is executive produced by Peanut Butter Wolf, and features the likes of Koushik, Tchaka Diallo, Gary Davis, Zacky Force Funk, Nathan No Face, and Megabusive.
