= Free Nationals =

American R&B band

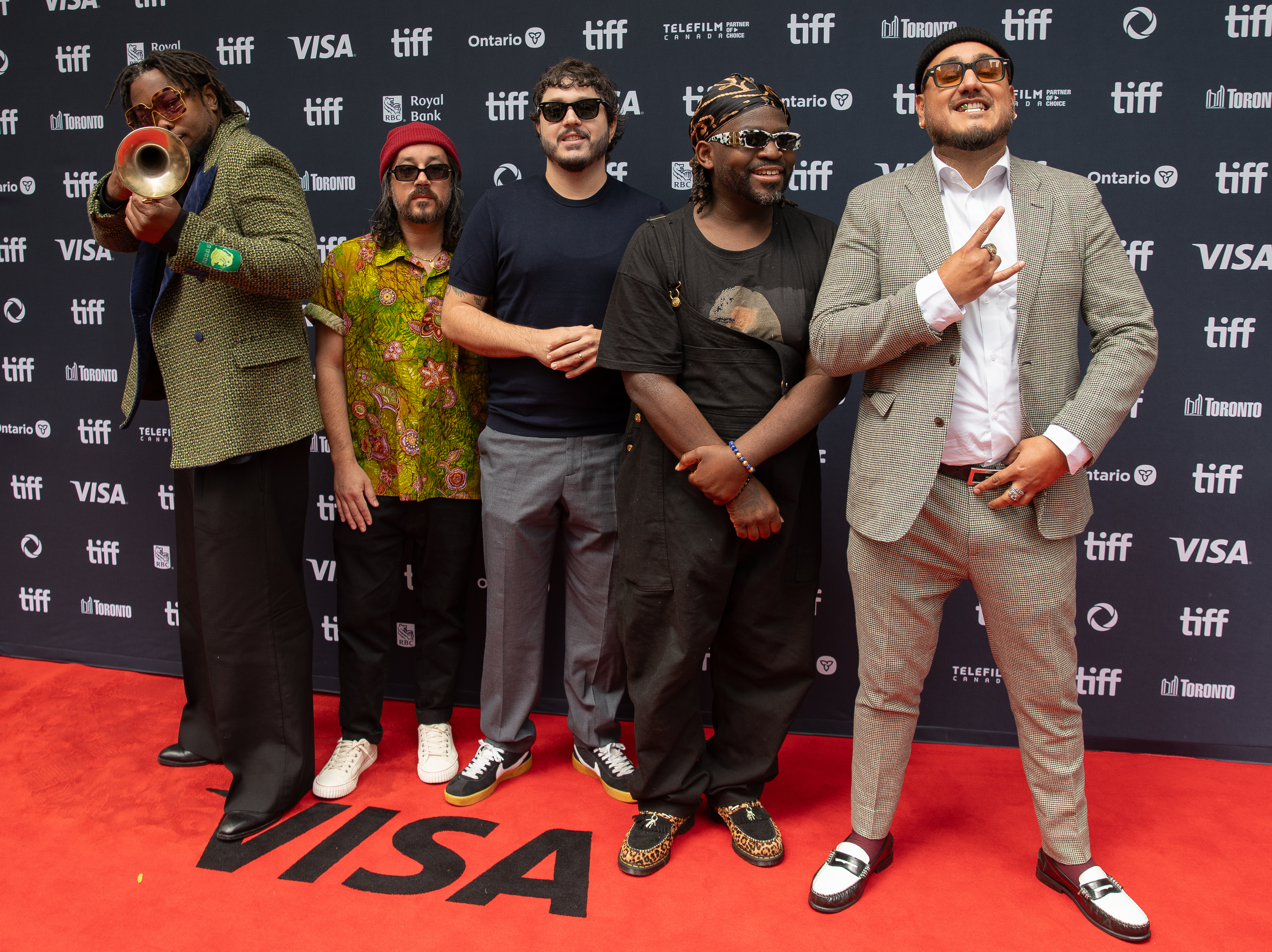
- Free Nationals with Maurice "Mobetta" Brown at the 2024 Toronto International Film Festival. From left to right: Maurice Brown, Kelsey González, Callum Connor, Ron "T.Nava" Avant, José Ríos.

Background information
- Origin: Los Angeles, California
- Genres: R&B; funk; progressive soul
- Years active: 2010–present
- Labels: OBE; EMPIRE; Apeshit
- Members: José Ríos; Ron "T.Nava" Avant; Kelsey González; Callum Connor
- Website: freenationals.co

Free Nationals are an American R&B band formed in Los Angeles, California. The group consists of José Ríos (lead guitar, backing vocals), Ron "T.Nava" Avant (keyboard, rhythm guitar, backing vocals), Kelsey González (bass guitar, bass synth) and Callum Connor (drums, percussion, backing vocals). They frequently accompany Anderson .Paak as his backing band.

== History ==
Guitarist José Ríos and keyboardist Ron Avant met Anderson .Paak while studying at Musicians Institute in Hollywood, California in the late 2000s. Bassist Kelsey Gonzalez and drummer Callum Connor joined them soon after and they formed the Free Nationals. The band went on to produce for Anderson and frequently tour with him. The idea for their name came from their mentor Shafiq Huisayn. Free Nationals is a term which means the first settlers of America before Columbus came, the people indigenous to the land. They took their own interpretation of this, being 'indigenous to the music' by paying homage to the influential musicians before them.

Their performance with Paak at his NPR Tiny Desk Concert in August 2016 is possibly their most significant appearance to date. The YouTube video has amassed over 104 million views so far, making it the 3rd most popular video in the Tiny Desk series.

The band released their debut single "Beauty & Essex" featuring Daniel Caesar and Unknown Mortal Orchestra on October 9, 2018. Their second single "Time" featuring Mac Miller and Kali Uchis, released on June 12, 2019, was the first official posthumous song from Miller since his death in September 2018. On December 13, 2019, they released their self-titled debut album through OBE and Empire Distribution. It was nominated for Best Progressive R&B album at the 63rd Annual Grammy Awards.

== Musical style and influence ==
Their music has been described as having a "future retro, funky and soulful sound". The band state that they 'stay indigenous to the funk' by paying tribute to their inspirations who include legendary musicians Stevie Wonder, B.B. King, Herbie Hancock and Al Green.

== Members ==
- José Ríos – lead guitars, backing vocals
- Ron "T.Nava" Avant – keyboards, synthesizers, talkbox, rhythm guitars, lead and backing vocals
- Kelsey González – bass guitar, guitar, bass synth, backing vocals, drums
- Callum Connor – DJ, drums, percussion, backing vocals

== Discography ==
=== Studio albums ===
Title	Details
Free Nationals	Released: December 13, 2019; Label: OBE, Empire; Format: Digital download, Streaming, CD, LP

=== Singles ===
List of singles, with selected chart positions
Title	Year	Peak chart positions	Certifications	Album
Title	Year	NZ Hot	Certifications	Album
"Beauty & Essex" (featuring Daniel Caesar and Unknown Mortal Orchestra)	2018	—	RMNZ: Gold	Free Nationals
"Time" (with Mac Miller and Kali Uchis)	2019	22	RMNZ: Gold	Free Nationals
"On Sight" (featuring JID, Kadhja Bonet and Miknna)	2019	—		Free Nationals
"Eternal Light" (featuring Chronixx)	2019	—	RMNZ: Gold	Free Nationals
"Shibuya" (featuring Syd)	2019	—		Free Nationals
"Gangsta" (featuring A$AP Rocky and Anderson .Paak)	2024	12		Non-album single
"—" denotes a recording that did not chart or was not released in that territory.

=== Guest appearances ===
Title	Year	Album
"Allstar" (Rae Khalil featuring Free Nationals)	2020	Fortheworld
"Photo ID" (Free Nationals Remix) (Remi Wolf featuring Free Nationals)	2020	We Love Dogs!
"Buddy" (T.Nava featuring Rae Khalil, Free Nationals, Black Nile & Chris Dave and The Drumhedz)	2021	Non-album singles
"Pretty Lady" (Free Nationals Remix) (Tash Sultana featuring Free Nationals)	2021	Non-album singles
"Strawberry Blush" (John Legend featuring Free Nationals)	2022	Legend

== Awards and nominations ==
=== Grammy Awards ===
Year	Nominee / work	Award	Result	Ref.
2021	Free Nationals	Best Progressive R&B Album	Nominated	
