= NxWorries =

American hip-hop duo

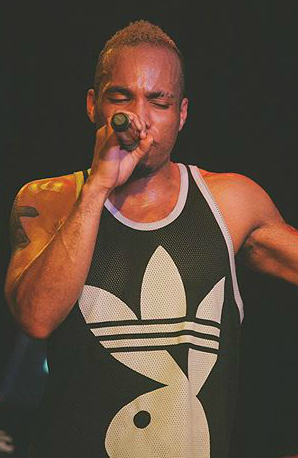
- Vocalist Anderson Paak performing in 2015

Background information
- Origin: Los Angeles, California, U.S.
- Genres: Hip hop; hip hop soul; R&B; neo soul
- Years active: 2015–present
- Label: Stones Throw
- Members: Anderson .Paak; Knxwledge

NxWorries (pronounced as "no worries") is an American music superduo consisting of recording artist Anderson .Paak and record producer Knxwledge. They are signed to Stones Throw Records and released their debut studio album, Yes Lawd!, in 2016 and their second studio album Why Lawd? in 2024.

== History ==
=== 2015–16: Formation and debut album ===
Knxwledge and Anderson .Paak's first song under the name NxWorries, "Suede" was released on February 10, 2015, via Stones Throw Records' SoundCloud page. The song sampled "The Bottle" by Gil Scott-Heron. The song reached more than a million SoundCloud listens and nearly as many YouTube plays.

In August 2015, Paak and Knxwledge, billed as NxWorries, joined rappers Earl Sweatshirt and Remy Banks on Sweatshirt's Ready to Leave Now Tour. On August 25, the music video for "Suede" was released on the official Stones Throw YouTube channel while another song, "Link Up", was first broadcast on Zane Lowe's Beats 1 radio show on December 1, 2015. The duo's debut EP Link Up & Suede was then released on December 4 under Stones Throw Records. The music video for "Link Up" was released on the official Stones Throw YouTube channel on March 3, 2016, featuring cameos from comedian Eric Andre and Earl Sweatshirt.

On June 19, 2016, Paak announced that NxWorries' debut album was finished and ready to be released. The album title Yes Lawd! was confirmed on July 25, 2016. On September 19, 2016, Yes Lawd! was set for a release date of October 21, 2016, while the lead single, "Lyk Dis", was also released with a music video. The album was released a week early on October 14.

=== 2017–present: Why Lawd? ===
Besides releasing a Yes Lawd! Remixes album in 2017, and more music videos until 2018, NxWorries seemed to be on an unannounced hiatus. It was not until March 27, 2020, when Knxwledge released his 1988 album containing the track "itkanbe[sonice]" featuring vocals from Anderson .Paak, that the NxWorries name was revived. During an interview with Zane Lowe on his Apple Music show in October 2020, Paak revealed that he and Knxwledge were currently working on their upcoming second album.

On December 2, 2020, NxWorries debuted a new song called "Where I Go" during their virtual performance on 88rising's Double Happiness Winter Wonder Festival. The song was officially released almost two years later on October 9, 2022; with a guest appearance from H.E.R., and serves as the lead single to their upcoming second album. They released another single titled "Daydreaming" on May 18, 2023.

On April 3, 2024, the album's third single, 86Sentra, was released, alongside an official announcement of the album's title Why Lawd?, as well as the scheduled June 7, 2024 release date.

== Discography ==
=== Studio albums ===
List of studio albums, with selected chart positions
Title	Album details	Peak chart positions			
Title	Album details	US	US R&B	AUS	NL
Yes Lawd!	Released: October 21, 2016; Label: Stones Throw; Format: Digital download, CD, LP	59	3	48	82
Why Lawd?	Released: June 7, 2024; Label: Stones Throw; Format: Digital download, CD, LP	81	26	—	68

=== Remix albums ===
List of remix albums
Title	Details
Yes Lawd! Remixes	Released: November 17, 2017; Label: Stones Throw; Format: Digital download, CD, LP

=== EPs ===
List of extended plays
Title	Details
Link Up & Suede	Released: December 4, 2015; Label: Stones Throw; Format: Digital download, CD, LP

=== Singles ===
List of singles, showing year released and album name
Title	Year	Peak chart positions	Album
Title	Year	NZ Hot	Album
"Suede"	2015	—	Link Up & Suede and Yes Lawd!
"Link Up"	2015	—	Link Up & Suede and Yes Lawd!
"Lyk Dis"	2016	—	Yes Lawd!
"Get Bigger / Do U Luv"	2016	—	Yes Lawd!
"Itkanbe[sonice]" (Knxwledge featuring NxWorries)	2020	—	1988
"Where I Go" (featuring H.E.R.)	2022	22	Why Lawd?
"Daydreaming"	2023	23	Why Lawd?
"86Sentra"	2024	—	Why Lawd?
"WalkOnBy" (featuring Earl Sweatshirt and Rae Khalil)	2024	37	Why Lawd?

=== Other charted songs ===
List of other charted songs, showing year released and album name
Title	Year	Peak chart positions	Album
Title	Year	NZ Hot	Album
"MoveOn"	2024	40	Why Lawd?
"KeepHer" (featuring Thundercat)	2024	36	Why Lawd?

=== Music videos ===
Title	Year	Director(s)
"Suede"	2015	Calmatic
"Link Up"	2016	Calmatic
"Scared Money"	2017	Calmatic
"Lyk Dis"	2018	Andy Baker
"Where I Go"	2022	Anderson .Paak

== Awards and nominations ==
Grammy Awards

Year	Nominee / work	Award	Result	Ref.
2025	Why Lawd?	Best Progressive R&B Album	Won	
