= Knxwledge =

American producer and songwriter (born 1988)

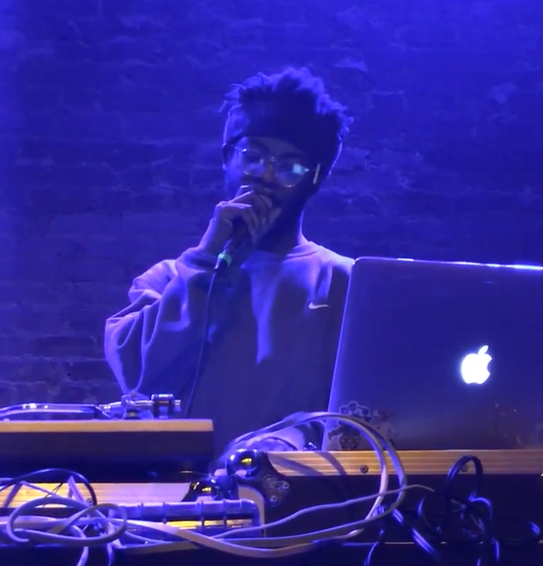
- Knxwledge live at The Hi Hat, LA in 2016

Background information
- Also known as: KNX; VATOGATO
- Born: Glen Earl Boothe; March 8, 1988 (age 38); Freehold Township, New Jersey, United States
- Origin: Los Angeles, California, United States
- Genres: Lofi hip hop; progressive hip hop
- Occupations: Record producer; songwriter
- Years active: 2009–present
- Labels: Stones Throw; All-City; Leaving; Klipmode
- Member of: NxWorries

Glen Earl Boothe (born March 8, 1988), professionally known as Knxwledge (pronounced "knowledge"), is an American hip hop record producer and songwriter from New Jersey, currently based in Japan. Since 2009, he has had over 200 releases via Bandcamp. His songs are often a mix of various genres, such as jazz, soul, old-school hip hop, and modern rap.

== Career ==
In 2010, Knxwledge released his debut album Klouds via All City. In 2013, he released a 53-track retrospective compilation titled Anthology on cassette, which was released by Leaving Records.

In 2015, Knxwledge released his debut album for Stones Throw Records, Hud Dreems, and produced the track "Momma" on Kendrick Lamar's release To Pimp a Butterfly, which went on to win Best Rap Album at the 58th annual Grammy Awards in 2016. His work alongside Anderson .Paak as the duo NxWorries has received critical acclaim. In March 2020 he released 1988, his second album for Stones Throw.

== Discography ==
=== Albums ===
- 2010 : Klouds
- 2010 : SKR∆WBERRiES.FUNR∆iSRS VOL.3
- 2011 : Old.Klouds.LP
- 2012 : Ovrstnd.LP
- 2012 : koapastetik.LP
- 2012 : klemintine|taype
- 2012 : Buttrskotch (LR023)
- 2013 : relevnt.b/sde_LP.
- 2013 : Anthology
- 2013 : Ovrstnd.B.Sde_
- 2013 : Kauliflowr
- 2015 : Hud Dreems
- 2017 : GREENTXTS.V1
- 2018 : GT.V2
- 2019 : Musiq.Prt_1
- 2019 : TodaysAlreadYesterday.
- 2019 : 終了していません
- 2020 : 1988
- 2020 : Musiq.PRT_2
- 2020 : 10,000 Proof
- 2022 : 家.V1
- 2023 : 家.V2
- 2024 : 家.V3
- 2025 : FGCテーマ.V1
- 2025 : ガムビーV1.
- 2026 : 家.3.88
- 2026 : ガムビーV2.
- 2026 : ガムビーV3.

=== Hexual Sealings series ===
- 2011 : HX.1
- 2011 : HX.1.8
- 2012 : HX.2
- 2012 : HX.2.8
- 2012 : HX.3
- 2012 : HX.3.8
- 2013 : HX.4.B
- 2013 : HX.4.A
- 2013 : HX.4.8
- 2013 : HX.5
- 2013 : HX.5.8
- 2013 : HX.6
- 2014 : HX.7
- 2014 : HX.7.8
- 2015 : HX.8
- 2015 : HX.8.8
- 2015 : HX.9
- 2016 : HX.9.8
- 2016 : HX.10
- 2017 : HX.10.8
- 2017 : HX.11
- 2017 : HX.11.8
- 2018 : HX.12
- 2018 : HX.12.8
- 2019 : HX.13
- 2019 : HX.13.8
- 2020 : HX.14
- 2020 : HX.14.8
- 2020 : HX.15
- 2020 : HX.15.8
- 2021 : HX.16
- 2021 : HX.17
- 2021 : HX.18
- 2021 : HX.19
- 2021 : HX.20
- 2022 : HX.21
- 2022 : HX.22
- 2022 : HX.23
- 2023 : HX.24
- 2023 : HX.25
- 2026 : HX.26

=== Wrap Taypes series ===
- 2011 : WT.1
- 2012 : WT.2
- 2012 : WT.3
- 2012 : WT.4
- 2013 : WT.4.8
- 2013 : WT.5
- 2013 : WT.5.8
- 2013 : WT.6
- 2013 : WT.6.8
- 2014 : WT.7
- 2015 : WT.7.8
- 2015 : WT.8
- 2015 : WT.9
- 2016 : WT.9.8
- 2016 : WT.10
- 2017 : WT.10.8
- 2017 : WT.11
- 2017 : WT.11.8
- 2017 : WT.12
- 2017 : WT.12.8
- 2018 : WT.13
- 2018 : WT.13.8[ラフミックス]
- 2019 : WT.14
- 2019 : WT.14.8[カセットバージョン]
- 2019 : WT.15.
- 2020 : WT15.8
- 2020 : WT.PRT.16.
- 2020 : WT16.8_
- 2021 : WT.17
- 2021 : WT.18
- 2022 : WT.19
- 2022 : WT.20
- 2023 : WT.21
- 2023 : WT.22
- 2026 : WT.23

=== Video Game Music series ===
- 2020 : VGM.1
- 2020 : VGM.2
- 2020 : VGM.3
- 2020 : VGM.4
- 2020 : VGM.5
- 2020 : VGM.6
- 2020 : VGM.7
- 2020 : VGM.8
- 2021 : VGM.9
- 2021 : VGM.10
- 2021 : VGM.11
- 2021 : VGM.12
- 2021 : VGM.13
- 2021 : VGM.14
- 2021 : VGM.15
- 2022 : VGM.16
- 2022 : VGM.17
- 2022 : VGM.18
- 2022 : VGM.19
- 2022 : VGM.20
- 2022 : VGM.21
- 2022 : VGM.22
- 2023 : VGM.23
- 2023 : VGM.24
- 2023 : VGM.25
- 2023 : VGM.26
- 2023 : VGM.27
- 2023 : VGM.28
- 2023 : VGM.29
- 2023 : VGM.30
- 2024 : VGM.31
- 2024 : VGM.32
- 2024 : VGM.33
- 2024 : VGM.34
- 2024 : VGM.35
- 2024 : VGM.36
- 2024 : VGM.37
- 2025 : VGM.38
- 2025 : VGM.39
- 2025 : VGM.40
- 2025 : VGM.41
- 2026 : VGM.42
- 2026 : VGM.43

=== Extended plays ===
- 2009 : 3p
- 2010 : K∆NN∆LOUPE.EP
- 2011 : Mango.EP
- 2011 : Gwapes.EP
- 2011 : Komposure.EP
- 2011 : Flowrs.EP
- 2011 : ShadySide.EP
- 2011 : Hud.Dreems.EP
- 2011 : Randomb.EP
- 2011 : Konsistensi.EP
- 2011 : UndrTheWeathr.EP
- 2012 : komfi.EP
- 2012 : karma.loops.prt.1
- 2012 : karma.loops.prt2
- 2012 : kuntent.EP
- 2012 : klarity.EP
- 2012 : kameo.EP
- 2012 : karma.loops.prt3
- 2012 : karma.loops.prt4
- 2012 : knt.remembr
- 2012 : [DB]FiXXX's
- 2012 : togethrniss_b_side
- 2012 : togethrniss_∆_side
- 2013 : Hud.Dreems.PRT.1.5
- 2013 : karma.loops.PRT.5
- 2013 : Ovrstnd.∆.Sde
- 2013 : Rap Jointz Vol.1
- 2015 : 2PK.4TRK_
- 2017 : MEEK.VOL1_
- 2018 : MEEK.VOL2_
- 2018 : MEEK.VOL3_
- 2018 : Gladwemet
- 2018 : 2PK.4TRK.B.SiDE.
- 2019 : MEEK.VOL4_
- 2020 : MEEK.VOL5_
- 2020 : MEEK.VOL6
- 2020 : Koko

=== Collaborations ===
- 2011 : AfrikanDivas. (with Sir Froderick, as SIRKNX.)
- 2013 : 777 #5 (with Mono/Poly)
- 2015 : DGM.VOL.1_VATOGATO&CAKEDOG (as VATOGATO, with Cakedog)
- 2015 : Link Up & Suede (with Anderson .Paak, as NxWorries)
- 2016 : Yes Lawd! (with Anderson .Paak, as NxWorries)
- 2017 : Yes Lawd! Remixes (with Anderson .Paak, as NxWorries)
- 2017 : The Spook... (with Mach-Hommy)
- 2018 : ボビーとボビーのボリューム1 (with Samiyam)
- 2018 : dntaskmefrshit. (with Roc Marciano)
- 2020 : DGM.VOL.2_VATOGATO&CAKEDOG (as VATOGATO, with Cakedog)
- 2024 : Why Lawd? (with Anderson .Paak, as NxWorries)
- 2024 : Michi: Knxwledge Remixes (with Michi)

=== Singles ===
- 2011 : Dryice
- 2011 : Petaluma[dnt.ask]
- 2016 : Fa-lala_
- 2017 : BBYBOY. (as VATOGATO)
- 2018 : yesindeed_[確かにはい]
- 2019 : jstfrends.
- 2020 : do you
- 2020 : learn
- 2020 : howtokope.
- 2020: dont be afraid
- 2020: [bc] tm_s not promised

=== Mixes ===
- 2011 : Krimbos[Medli]
- 2012 : Takeitbak.Medli
- 2012 : klosetoyew[TOUR.MiXX]
- 2012 : Boiler Room Mix
- 2013 : Touching Bass
- 2013 : Welcome to Mandeville (New Years Edition)
- 2015 : StrwbrryMomnts

== Production discography ==
=== 2011 ===
- Blu – "4u" and "dotheknxwledge (Outerlude)" from Jesus
- Vida Jafari – "Jukeroo" and "Movin' Remix" from Movin.EP
- Co$$ – "What It Is ?" – from Before I Awoke

=== 2012 ===
- Joey Badass feat. Capital Steez – "Killuminati" from 1999
- Capital Steez feat. Jakk the Rapper – "Black Petunia" from AmeriKKKan Korruption
- Chief Kamachi - "City Blocks" from Rise and Rhyme, Vol . 1

=== 2013 ===
- Iman Omari – "(VIBE)rations (Intro)" from (VIBE)rations
- Blu – "Keep Pushinn" from York
- Joey Badass – "Killuminati Part 2"
- Quelle Chris – "Look at Shorty" from Ghost At The Finish Line
- Blu – "Timejuss" and "Draginbreff" from Classic Drug References Vol.1

=== 2014 ===
- Jeremiah Jae – "Almost" from Good Times
- Pyramid Vritra – "Track Three" from Palace
- Homeboy Sandman – "Problems" from Hallways
- Hus Kingpin – "Pyramid Points(Knxwledge Remix)" and "Style Star(Knxwledge Remix)" from Richard Dumas: The Mixtape
- Fatima - "Underwater" from Yellow Memories
- Eagle Nebula - "Most Beautiful" from Call Me Nebs

=== 2015 ===
- Kendrick Lamar – "Momma" from To Pimp a Butterfly
- Big Twins – "It's a Stick Up" from Thrive 2
- Sir – "In The Sky", "Love You" and "The Bullet and the Gun" from Seven Sundays

=== 2016 ===
- Omarion and Ghostface Killah – "I Ain't Even Done"
- Remy Banks – "supreme interlude."
- Earl Sweatshirt feat. Knxwledge – "Balance" from Adult Swim Singles Program 2016
- Mach-Hommy – "Gnarly Dude" from F.Y.I.
- Mach-Hommy – "Fresh Off the Boat" from H.B.O. (Haitian Body Odor)
- Currensy and Alchemist – "Cartridge Remix" and "Fat Albert Remix" feat. Lil Wayne from The Carrollton Heist: Remixed
- Hodgy – "Dreaminofthinkin" from Fireplace: TheNotTheOtherSide
- Mach-Hommy – "Selfy Stik"

=== 2017 ===
- Tha God Fahim – "GreenLITE" and "Dark Shogunn" from Tha Dark Shogunn Saga Vol. 2
- Prodigy – "The Good Fight" from Hegelian Dialectic (The Book of Revelation)
- Roc Marciano – "No Smoke" from Rosebudd's Revenge
- Tha God Fahim – "Tek & An O-Z" from Dreams of Medina 2
- Tha God Fahim – "Child of Destiny" from Dump Legend 2
- Action Bronson – "Hot Pepper" and "Durag vs. Headband" from Blue Chips 7000
- Mach-Hommy – "Ron van Clief" and "Faraday Cage" from Dumpmeister
- Westside Gunn – "B Lunch" from Hitler Wears Hermes V

=== 2018 ===
- Denmark Vessey – "Stolat" and "Sun Go Nova" from Sun Go Nova
- Action Bronson – "Live From the Moon", "Prince Charming", and "Picasso's Ear" from White Bronco

=== 2019 ===
- Mabanua - "Call on Me feat. Chara (Knxwledge Remix)"

=== 2020 ===
- Elijah Boothe – "Simple"
- Steve Arrington – "Make Ya Say Yie" and "Love Is Gone" from Down to The Lowest Terms: The Soul Sessions

=== 2021 ===
- Bruiser Wolf – "Momma Was A Dopefiend" from Dope Game Stupid
- Khruangbin - "Dearest Alfred (Knxwledge Remix)" from Mordechai Remixes

=== 2022 ===
- Quelle Chris - "The Sky is Blue Because The Sunset Is Red" from DEATHFAME
- Fatlip & Blu - "Street Life" feat. MC Eiht from Live From The End of The World, Vol 1 Demos
