= Stones Throw Records =

American independent record label

- Founded: 1996
- Founder: Chris Manak
- Distributors: Caroline/Virgin Music (former); Redeye Distribution (current)
- Genre: Hip-hop; electronic; funk; soul; indie pop; rock; jazz
- Country of origin: United States
- Location: Los Angeles, California
- Official website: stonesthrow.com

Stones Throw Records is an American independent record label based in Los Angeles, California. Under the direction of founder Peanut Butter Wolf, Stones Throw has released music ranging from hip-hop to experimental psychedelic rock. LA Weekly deemed the label an "eternally evolving experiment" in celebration of its 20th anniversary.

== History ==
=== 1990s ===
Chris Manak, known professionally as Peanut Butter Wolf, founded Stones Throw in 1996 as a means of releasing music he had recorded previously with the subsequently deceased rapper Charles Edward Hicks Jr., known professionally as Charizma. Hicks and Manak met in 1989 at 16 and 19, respectively, and began collaborating as Charizma and Peanut Butter Wolf. The duo released one promo cassette of "Red Light Green Light" through Hollywood Basic—the now-defunct hip-hop subsidiary of Hollywood Records—before leaving the label. Their collaboration was cut short in 1993, when Hicks was fatally shot in a carjacking at the age of 20. Stones Throw's first release, "My World Premiere" by Charizma and Peanut Butter Wolf, arrived three years later.

=== 2004–2014 ===
The label has released hip-hop records including Madvillainy, the acclaimed debut from Madvillain (a collaboration between producer Madlib and rapper MF Doom) in 2004, and J Dilla's Donuts in 2006. Other notable hip-hop artists on Stones Throw's roster include Madlib, Jaylib and Quasimoto. In addition to hip-hop, artists on Stones Throw's roster work in genres including funk and soul, electronic, indie pop, psychedelic rock, jazz, and more. Stones Throw releases the majority of their artists' albums on vinyl in addition to digital formats.

Stones Throw released singer-songwriter Aloe Blacc's debut album, Shine Through, in 2006. Pitchfork wrote that Shine Through signaled "some sort of greatness." Blacc's second album Good Things came out on Stones Throw in 2010. Good Things was certified gold in the UK, France, Germany and Australia, among other countries, and ultimately went double platinum. The single "I Need A Dollar", which was used as the theme song to the HBO series How To Make It in America, reached 1 million in sales in 2013; two additional singles, "Loving You Is Killing Me" and "Green Lights" became European hits as well.

Also in 2013, Stones Throw released 7 Days of Funk, the eponymous debut studio album by California-based funk duo 7 Days of Funk, consisting of rapper Snoop Dogg —performing under his funk persona Snoopzilla — and modern-funk musician Dâm-Funk. The album was Snoop's first project with a single producer since his landmark 1993 debut album, Doggystyle.

R&B singer Mayer Hawthorne debuted on Stones Throw in 2008 with the single "Just Ain't Gonna Work Out" / "When I Said Goodbye", which was released on a red heart-shaped 7" record. Hawthorne's debut album A Strange Arrangement was released on Stones Throw Records in 2009. Hawthorne is also one half of the funk duo Tuxedo, with producer Jake One; their debut self-titled album was released on Stones Throw in 2015 and Tuxedo II in 2017.

In 2014, the documentary Our Vinyl Weighs a Ton: This is Stones Throw Records was released. The feature-length film, directed by Jeff Broadway, depicts the label's evolution from the initial collaboration between Hicks and Manak to Stones Throw's influence on mainstream hip-hop. Artists such as Kanye West, Tyler, The Creator, and Questlove appear in the documentary and offer testimonials.

=== 2015–present ===
Mild High Club, the psychedelic pop project helmed by musician Alex Brettin, released their debut album Timeline in 2015. In 2016, Mild High Club released their second album, Skiptracing, on Stones Throw, which included the RIAA-certified gold single, "Homage".

Hip-hop producer Knxwledge's Stones Throw debut was Hud Dreems, released in 2015. Knxwledge also produced the track "Momma" on Kendrick Lamar's album To Pimp a Butterfly released the same year. In 2016, Stones Throw announced the signing of NxWorries, the duo consisting of singer Anderson .Paak and Knxwledge, with the viral single "Suede". NxWorries' debut album Yes Lawd! was released in the same year. In 2022, NxWorries released the first single "Where I Go" featuring H.E.R from their upcoming second album, and in 2023 they released the second single "Daydreaming".

In 2019, Stones Throw released "Someone to Spend Time With", the debut viral single from Oxnard-based band Los Retros. The band followed their release with the Retrospect EP the same year, the Everlasting EP in 2020, and the Looking Back EP in 2021.

Stones Throw signed singer, songwriter, and violinist Sudan Archives in 2016 and released her debut album, Athena, in 2019. In 2022, she released her follow-up album Natural Brown Prom Queen, which received "universal acclaim" according to Metacritic, and performed at festivals including Glastonbury, Coachella, Fujirock and Bonnaroo. At the 2023 Libera Awards, organized by the American Association of Independent Music (A2IM), Sudan Archives received awards for Best R&B Record and Best Breakthrough Artist/Release.

In 2018 Stones Throw opened Gold Line, a cocktail bar featuring a collection of 7,500 vinyl records and hosting all-vinyl DJ sets. Gold Line is located beneath Stones Throw headquarters in the Highland Park neighborhood of Los Angeles.

== Artists ==
- 7 Days of Funk
- Aloe Blacc
- Angela Muñoz
- Anika
- Apifera
- Arabian Prince
- Automatic
- Bardo
- Baron Zen
- Benny Sings
- Blarf
- Boardwalk
- Breakestra
- Eddie Chacon
- Chrome Canyon
- CohenBeats
- Dam-Funk
- DJ Harrison
- Dudley Perkins
- Frankie Reyes
- Franklin Thompson
- Gabriel da Rosa
- Gabriel Garzón-Montano
- Gary Wilson
- Georgia Anne Muldrow
- Gifted & Blessed
- Guilty Simpson
- Homeboy Sandman
- J Dilla
- J Rocc
- Jamael Dean
- James Pants
- Jaylib
- Jerry Paper
- John Carroll Kirby
- Jonti
- Jonwayne
- Karriem Riggins
- Josh da Costa
- Kiefer
- King Pari
- Knxwledge
- Koushik
- Kyle M
- Lootpack
- Madlib
- Madvillain
- Mayer Hawthorne
- Maylee Todd
- M.E.D.
- MF Doom
- Michi
- Mild High Club
- Mndsgn
- Natural Numbers
- NxWorries
- Oh No
- Peanut Butter Wolf
- Pearl and the Oysters
- Percee P
- Peyton
- Prophet
- Pyramid Vritra
- Quakers
- Quasimoto
- Rasco
- Rejoicer
- Samiyam
- Savath & Savalas
- Scuba Slim
- Silas Short
- Sofie Royer
- Sound Directions
- Steve Arrington
- Stimulator Jones
- Strong Arm Steady
- Sudan Archives
- Teeth Agency
- The Koreatown Oddity
- The Steoples
- The Stepkids
- The Turntablist
- The Twilite Tone
- Vex Ruffin
- Washed Out
- Yesterdays New Quintet

== See also ==
- List of record labels
- Underground hip-hop
