= Anderson .Paak =

American singer (born 1986)

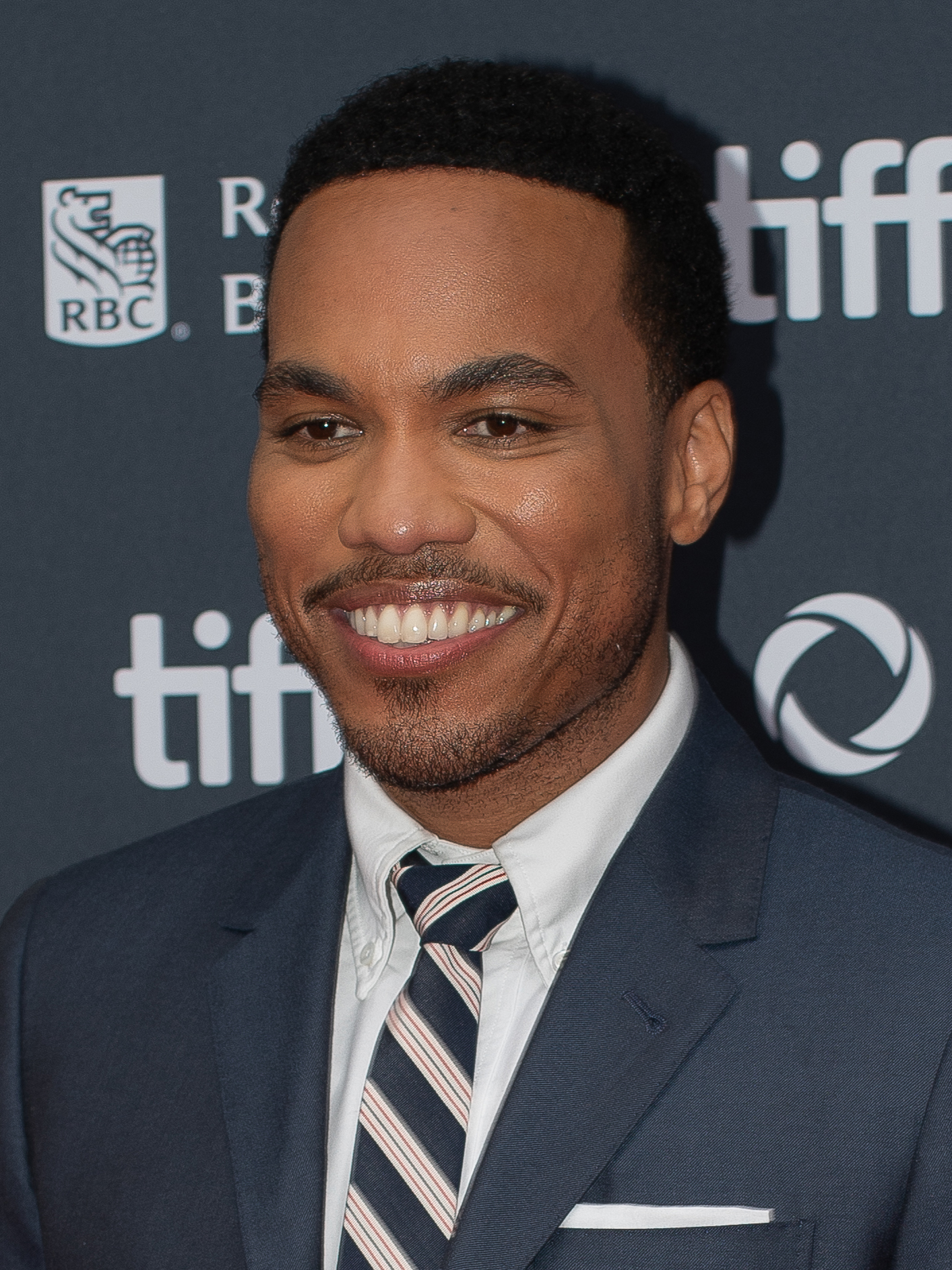
- Anderson in 2024
- Born: Brandon Paak Anderson; February 8, 1986 (age 40); Oxnard, California, U.S.
- Other names: Breezy Lovejoy; Cheeky Andy; DJ Pee .Wee
- Occupations: Singer; rapper; drummer; songwriter; record producer; actor
- Years active: 2009–present
- Spouse: Jaylyn Chang (m. 2011; div. 2026)
- Children: 2
- Musical career
- Genres: R&B; soul; funk; hip-hop
- Instruments: Vocals; drums
- Labels: 12Tone; Aftermath; ArtClub; SteelWool; Stones Throw; Empire; Hellfyre Club; OBE; Capitol
- Member of: NxWorries; Silk Sonic
- Website: andersonpaak.com

Brandon Paak Anderson (born February 8, 1986), known professionally as Anderson .Paak (/pæk/ PACK or /pɑːk/ PAHK), is an American singer, rapper, drummer, and record producer. He released his debut mixtape, O.B.E. Vol. 1, in 2012 and went on to release his debut album, Venice, in 2014. In 2016, he followed up with his second album, Malibu, which received a Grammy Award nomination for Best Urban Contemporary Album, followed by his third album, Oxnard (2018). At the 61st Grammy Awards, Paak won his first Grammy Award for Best Rap Performance with his 2018 non-album single "Bubblin". In 2020, he won two additional Grammy Awards for Best R&B Album with his fourth album Ventura, while a song from the album won Best R&B Performance with "Come Home" (featuring André 3000).

Apart from his solo career, Anderson formed the duo NxWorries in 2015 with producer Knxwledge. He is frequently accompanied by the band Free Nationals, who play a variety of instruments, such as electric guitar, bass, piano, keyboards and drums, and also serve as backing vocalists. In 2021, he formed the duo Silk Sonic with singer-songwriter Bruno Mars. The duo's debut single, "Leave the Door Open", became Anderson's first single to reach number one on the Billboard Hot 100, and was the recipient of four awards at the 64th Grammy Awards, including Song of the Year and Record of the Year.

== Early life ==
Brandon Paak Anderson was born on February 8, 1986, at St. John's Regional Medical Center in Oxnard, California. He is of mixed African American and Korean heritage. Anderson's mother was born in South Korea during the Korean War to a Korean woman and an African American man who is presumed to have been a soldier. She was abandoned in a Korean orphanage and adopted by an African-American family in Compton.

At age seven, Anderson saw his estranged father attack his mother: "My little sister and I went out front and my pops was on top of my mom. There was blood in the street. He was arrested and that was the last time I saw him. I think he did 14 years."

Shortly after he started his senior year of high school, his mother was convicted of major fraud. "I got a call in class: 'They arrested your mom today.'" Anderson's mother pleaded guilty to defrauding investors of millions using her produce distribution company. She received a seven-year prison sentence.

== Career ==
=== 2009–2013: Beginnings ===
Anderson began producing music from his bedroom as a teenager, while attending Foothill Technology High School. His first experiences performing were as a drummer at his family's church. In 2011, prior to being a successful working musician, Anderson became homeless with his wife and infant son after he was dismissed from his job at a marijuana farm in Santa Barbara. Early in his career, Anderson used the stage name Breezy Lovejoy.

In 2011, Anderson had started earning acceptance in the Los Angeles music scene as he worked on his debut album. Shafiq Husayn of Sa-Ra and Los Angeles–based rapper Dumbfoundead helped Anderson recover financially from losing his job in Santa Barbara by employing him as an assistant, videographer, editor, writer and producer. He completed O.B.E. Vol. 1 and released the album on June 30, 2012. He became the drummer for former American Idol semi-finalist Haley Reinhart. After the release of O.B.E. Vol. 1, Anderson changed his stage name to Anderson .Paak; he claims that the dot stands for "detail", the need to pay attention to detail.

On November 27, 2013, Paak produced and recorded Cover Art, an all-covers EP. Paak was inspired by white artists of the 1950s who achieved commercial success by remaking songs written by Black blues and R&B singers, while rarely compensating the original artists. Cover Art reversed the process and transformed folk and rock classics from white musicians into a mold of soul, funk, jazz, left-field pop, hip-hop, and R&B. The album was released by the independent Hellfyre Club and OBE labels. Paak was the lead producer for Watsky's 2014 album All You Can Do and is featured on three of its sixteen tracks.

=== 2014–2017: Venice and Malibu ===
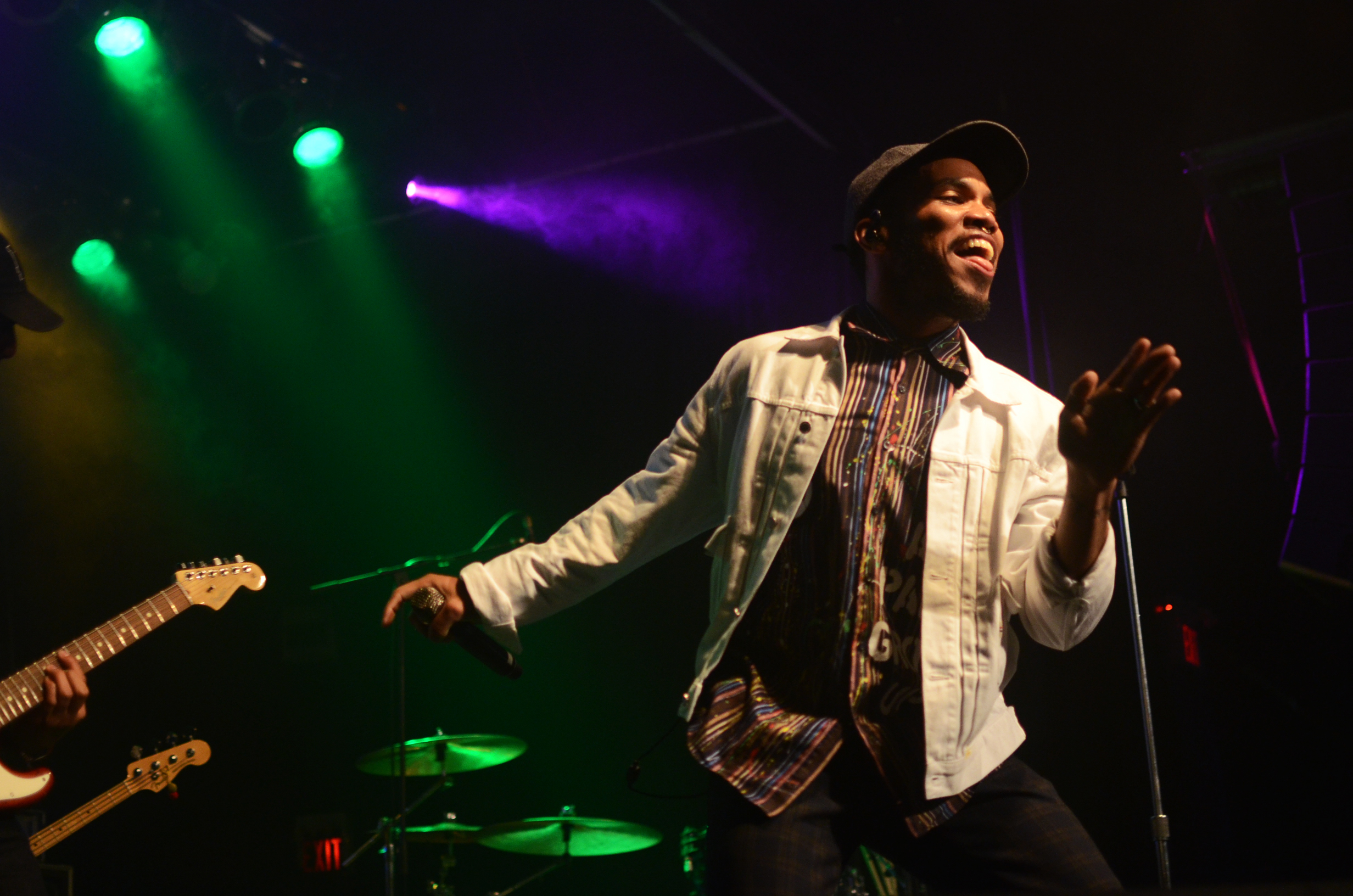
Paak performing in July 2016

On October 28, 2014, Paak released his debut album, Venice, as Anderson .Paak, on OBE and Steel Wool. Paak performed on six songs on Dr. Dre's 2015 album Compton and two on The Game's The Documentary 2.5. In 2014, Paak joined Jhené Aiko on her Enter The Void tour. In October 2015, he announced that he had recorded material with Schoolboy Q and 9th Wonder. Paak released his second album, Malibu, on January 15, 2016, to critical acclaim, featuring contributions from 9th Wonder, Rapsody, and Kaytranada.

In January 2016, he indicated that he had been recording with Flying Lotus. On January 30, 2016, Paak spoke with Scott Simon of NPR's Weekend Edition Saturday about his tumultuous background as a child of mixed-race parents, that the "." in his name stands for "detail", his apprenticeship with Dr. Dre and how all of these influences shaped his music. On January 30, Paak announced via Twitter he has signed to Dr. Dre's Aftermath Entertainment. He said he always sends his ideas to Dr. Dre and the two work very fast. In 2016, Paak was named one of the XXL Freshmen, along with Lil Dicky, Desiigner, Dave East, Denzel Curry, Lil Yachty, G Herbo, Lil Uzi Vert, 21 Savage, and Kodak Black.

In August 2016, Paak performed on NPR Music's Tiny Desk Concert series with his backing band the Free Nationals. The concert became one of "the most popular in the history of the series", according to NPR.

=== 2018–2019: Oxnard and Ventura ===
In 2018, Paak's new single "Til It's Over" featured in a TV commercial released by Apple Inc. The advertisement was directed by Spike Jonze, featuring FKA Twigs in the video, promoting the Apple HomePod smart speaker. Along with collaborations with Apple, "Til It's Over" was used in a playlist in the 2018 video game Forza Horizon 4. His song "Bubblin" was in the playlist of Madden NFL 19. In an interview with Complex magazine posted on October 10, 2018, Paak revealed that his forthcoming album Oxnard would be released on November 16, 2018. Paak released his third studio album Oxnard on November 16. The album is executive produced by Dr. Dre and is an homage to Paak's hometown in California. The album has a heavy funk theme throughout the project and features artists such as Kendrick Lamar, Snoop Dogg, Pusha T, and J. Cole. The album features the song "Cheers", a Q-Tip featured track paying homage to Mac Miller. He co-wrote two songs on Liberation, the sixth album by Christina Aguilera, in 2018. On December 3, 2018, Paak announced a world tour in support of Oxnard. The tour is titled Andy's Beach Club and began in the U.S. on February 11, 2019, before heading to Europe.

Paak released his fourth studio album, Ventura, on April 12, 2019, featuring artists such as André 3000, Smokey Robinson, Brandy, and Nate Dogg, among others. Ventura was executive produced by Dr. Dre and was released by Dre's record label, Aftermath Entertainment. The title follows the theme of his previous albums, making his way up the California coast. Whereas Oxnard covered various snippets of Paak's life in vivid detail, Ventura homes in on more personal details of the artist himself, returning to the mine of slick R&B and funk rap of his acclaimed debut, Malibu. "Growing up in Oxnard gave me the grit and the church to find this voice of mine. One town over, I went further and found my depth," Paak said in a press statement. He announced a new tour, titled The Best Teef In the Game Tour, with Free Nationals, which began on May 17, 2019. The tour was supported by Thundercat, Mac DeMarco, Earl Sweatshirt, Noname, and Jessie Reyez. Paak's music video "Bubblin" was nominated for Best Director at the Berlin Music Video Awards in 2019.

=== 2020–2023: Silk Sonic and Justice ===
On January 20, 2020, Paak was a guest showcase model on the television game show The Price Is Right. Also in January 2020, Paak was featured on Eminem's eleventh studio album, titled Music to Be Murdered By, on the track "Lock It Up".

Paak released the non-album single "Lockdown" in June 2020, coinciding with the commemoration of Juneteenth. The music video, directed by Dave Meyers, featured appearances from Jay Rock, Dumbfoundead, SiR, Syd, Dominic Fike and other musicians. In August 2020, Paak was featured on the soundtrack to the Madden NFL 21 game, on the song "Cut Em In", featuring Rick Ross, which was also played during the end credits of Tom & Jerry.

On February 26, 2021, Paak and fellow American singer-songwriter Bruno Mars announced they formed a band together called Silk Sonic. Their debut studio album, An Evening with Silk Sonic, was released on November 12, 2021, and includes a collaboration with Thundercat and Bootsy Collins. On April 21, 2021, Paak signed a worldwide administrative deal with Warner Chappell Music in partnership with Dr. Dre's Hard Workin' Black Folks publishing company. The agreement includes Paak's and Bruno Mars' Silk Sonic single "Leave the Door Open" and both Paak's music catalog and future releases. The single topped the US Billboard Hot 100, becoming .Paak's first song to do so. "Smokin out the Window" also reached the top 10 on the Hot 100. For the 2022 Grammy Awards, Silk Sonic received four Grammy nominations for "Leave the Door Open", including Record of the Year and Song of the Year.

In November 2021, Paak partnered with Universal Music Group to form a new record label called Apeshit Inc. Paak worked with fellow American rapper Dr. Dre on an album for the Rockstar Games video game Grand Theft Auto Online. The DLC was released on December 15, 2021, and the album was released publicly on February 4, 2022. Paak was featured as a minor character in the game. On February 13, 2022, Paak was a special guest (on drums) at the Super Bowl LVI halftime show, which featured performances from fellow American rappers Dr. Dre, Snoop Dogg, Eminem, Kendrick Lamar, Mary J. Blige, and 50 Cent.

=== 2024–present: Why Lawd? and K-Pops! ===
On June 7, 2024, Paak and his collaborator Knxwledge, under the name NxWorries, released their second studio album, Why Lawd?. The album was released physically on June 7, 2024, by Stones Throw Records, and was made available digitally on June 14, 2024. The album received critical acclaim for its fusion of neo-soul, jazz, and hip-hop, continuing the duo's reputation for creating unique and innovative sounds.

In May 2025, he collaborated with the champagne brand Dom Pérignon for a campaign named "Creation is an Eternal Journey".

Paak's directorial debut film, K-Pops! debuted at the Toronto International Film Festival in 2024 and was released theatrically in February 2026.

== Personal life ==
Paak met his wife, Jaylyn Chang, a music student from South Korea, while she was in college. In 2011, prior to being a successful working musician, Paak was working at a marijuana farm in Santa Barbara. He was dismissed without warning and became homeless with his wife and infant son. The couple had a second son in 2017. In 2017, Paak confirmed during an interview with The Breakfast Club that this is his second marriage, but that "Jaylyn is the one that matters". In January 2024, Paak filed for divorce after thirteen years of marriage. The divorce was finalized on September 3, 2026.

Paak has a tattoo on his chest, depicting Stevie Wonder, Aretha Franklin, James Brown, Prince, and Miles Davis, and a tattoo on his arm with the text, "When I'm gone please don't release any posthumous albums or songs with my name attached. Those were just demos and never intended to be heard by the public".

== Charity ==
In 2016, Paak founded The Brandon Anderson Foundation, a nonprofit organization which aims to "Support and create initiatives that uplift, engage and support the community through access to the arts, supplemental education and unique experiences to expand the imagination". In December 2017, he launched .Paak House, an annual benefit concert which helps raise funds for the organisation. Past performers at the concert include The Game, Jay Rock, Kali Uchis, Jhené Aiko, Ty Dolla Sign, Cordae, Freddie Gibbs, Masego, Thundercat and Schoolboy Q. As of 2021, the organisation has raised more than half a million dollars and provided over 3,000 families in the Greater Los Angeles area with basic necessities. In 2021 .Paak House was hosted at College Park in Oxnard. The May 2023 event was held at the Ventura County Fairgrounds in Ventura. On January 30, 2025, Paak performed at the FireAid benefit concert, a two-venue music-based fundraising initiative held in Inglewood, California, hosted simultaneously at the Kia Forum and the Intuit Dome.

== Discography ==
=== Solo albums ===
- Venice (2014)
- Malibu (2016)
- Oxnard (2018)
- Ventura (2019)

=== Collaborative albums ===
- Yes Lawd! (with Knxwledge, as NxWorries) (2016)
- An Evening with Silk Sonic (with Bruno Mars, as Silk Sonic) (2021)
- Why Lawd? (with Knxwledge, as NxWorries) (2024)
- Heavy Is the Crown (with Cordae) (2026)

== Filmography ==
=== Films ===
Year	Title	Role	Notes	Ref.
2020	Trolls World Tour	Prince Darnell	Voice role	
2023	Trolls Band Together	Prince Darnell	Voice cameo	
2024	Sweet Dreams	D Squiz	—N/a	
2024	K-Pops!	BJ	Also co-writer and director	
2026	Earth, Wind & Fire (To Be Celestial vs That's the Weight of the World)	Himself		
—N/a	Golden	—N/a	Unreleased	

Key
†	Denotes films that have not yet been released

=== Television ===
Year	Title	Role	Notes	Ref.
2020	The Eric Andre Show	Himself	Episode: "A King is Born"	
2021	Trolls: Holiday in Harmony	Prince Darnell	TV movie, voice role	
2022–2023	We Baby Bears	TK	2 episodes, voice role	
2023	Baby Shark's Big Show!	Anderswim .Shaark	1 episode, voice role	
2023–2024	Grown-ish	Himself	2 episodes, with the Free Nationals	
2024	Yo Gabba Gabbaland!	Himself	Episode: "Land"	
2025	Survival of the Thickest	Himself	1 episode	

=== Video Games ===
Year	Title	Role	Notes	Ref.
2021	Grand Theft Auto Online	Himself	Featured in "The Contract" Update	

== Tours ==
Headlining

- Andy's Beach Club (with Free Nationals) (2019)
- The Best Teef In the Game Tour (with Free Nationals) (2020)
- An Evening with Silk Sonic at Park MGM (with Bruno Mars, as Silk Sonic) (2022)
- Why Lawd? Tour (with Knxwledge, as NxWorries) (2025)

Supporting

- Wintervention Tour (Wax & Dumbfoundead) (2013)
- Enter The Void Tour (Jhené Aiko) (2014)
- All You Can Do Tour (Watsky) (2014)
- 24K Magic World Tour (Bruno Mars) (2017)
- 2022 Global Stadium Tour (Red Hot Chili Peppers) (2022)
- The Romantic Tour (as DJ Pee .Wee) (Bruno Mars) (2026)

== Awards and nominations ==
Award	Year (Note: Indicates the year of ceremony. Each year is linked to the article about the awards held that year, wherever possible.)	Recipient(s)	Category	Result	Ref.
American Music Awards	2021	Silk Sonic (with Bruno Mars)	Favorite Duo or Group – Pop	Nominated	
American Music Awards	2021	"Leave the Door Open" (with Bruno Mars)	Favorite Music Video	Nominated	
American Music Awards	2021	"Leave the Door Open" (with Bruno Mars)	Favorite Song – R&B	Won	
American Music Awards	2022	An Evening with Silk Sonic	Favorite R&B Album	Nominated	
American Music Awards	2022	"Smokin out the Window"	Favorite R&B Song	Nominated	
BET Awards	2021	Silk Sonic (with Bruno Mars)	Best Group	Won	
BET Awards	2021	"Leave the Door Open" (with Bruno Mars)	Video of the Year	Nominated	
BET Awards	2021	"Leave the Door Open" (with Bruno Mars)	Viewer's Choice Award	Nominated	
BET Awards	2021	Himself	Best Male R&B/Pop Artist	Nominated	
BET Awards	2022	Silk Sonic (with Bruno Mars)	Best Group	Won	
BET Awards	2022	"Smokin out the Window"	Video of the Year	Won (Note: Tied with Baby Keem and Kendrick Lamar for "Family Ties".)	
BET Awards	2022	An Evening with Silk Sonic	Album of the Year	Won	
BET Awards	2022	Himself	Video Director of the Year	Won	
BET Awards	2026	Himself	Video Director of the Year	Nominated	
BET Hip Hop Awards	2016	Himself	Best New Hip Hop Artist	Nominated	
BET Hip Hop Awards	2019	Himself	Best Foreign Act	Nominated	
Billboard Music Awards	2022	Silk Sonic (with Bruno Mars)	Top Duo/Group	Nominated	
Billboard Music Awards	2022	Silk Sonic (with Bruno Mars)	Top R&B Artist	Nominated	
Billboard Music Awards	2022	An Evening with Silk Sonic	Top R&B Album	Nominated	
Billboard Music Awards	2022	"Leave the Door Open" (with Bruno Mars)	Top R&B Song	Won	
Brit Awards	2022	Silk Sonic (with Bruno Mars)	International Group of the Year	Won	
Grammy Awards	2017	Himself	Best New Artist	Nominated	
Grammy Awards	2017	Malibu	Best Urban Contemporary Album	Nominated	
Grammy Awards	2019	"Bubblin"	Best Rap Performance	Won	
Grammy Awards	2020	Ventura	Best R&B Album	Won	
Grammy Awards	2020	"Come Home" (feat. André 3000)	Best R&B Performance	Won	
Grammy Awards	2021	"Lockdown"	Best Music Video	Nominated	
Grammy Awards	2021	"Lockdown"	Best Melodic Rap Performance	Won	
Grammy Awards	2022	"Leave the Door Open" (with Bruno Mars)	Record of the Year	Won	
Grammy Awards	2022	"Leave the Door Open" (with Bruno Mars)	Song of the Year	Won	
Grammy Awards	2022	"Leave the Door Open" (with Bruno Mars)	Best R&B Performance	Won	
Grammy Awards	2022	"Leave the Door Open" (with Bruno Mars)	Best R&B Song	Won	
Grammy Awards	2023	Good Morning Gorgeous (As featured artist & songwriter)	Album of the Year	Nominated	
Grammy Awards	2023	"Here With Me" (with Mary J. Blige)	Best R&B Performance	Nominated	
Grammy Awards	2025	Why Lawd? (with Knxwledge)	Best Progressive R&B Album	Won	
Grammy Awards	2026	"No Cap" (with Disclosure)	Best Dance/Electronic Recording	Nominated	
iHeartRadio Music Awards	2022	"Leave the Door Open" (with Bruno Mars)	Song of the Year	Nominated	
iHeartRadio Music Awards	2022	Silk Sonic (with Bruno Mars)	Best Duo/Group of the Year	Won	
iHeartRadio Music Awards	2022	An Evening with Silk Sonic	R&B Album of the Year	Won	
iHeartRadio Music Awards	2022	"Leave the Door Open" (with Bruno Mars)	R&B Song of the Year	Won	
iHeartRadio Music Awards	2022	Silk Sonic (with Bruno Mars)	R&B Artist of the Year	Nominated	
iHeartRadio Music Awards	2022	"Leave the Door Open" (with Bruno Mars)	Best Lyrics	Nominated	
iHeartRadio Music Awards	2022	"Leave the Door Open" (with Bruno Mars)	Best Music Video	Nominated	
iHeartRadio Music Awards	2023	Silk Sonic (with Bruno Mars)	Best Duo/Group of the Year	Nominated	
iHeartRadio Music Awards	2023	Silk Sonic (with Bruno Mars)	R&B Artist of the Year	Nominated	
iHeartRadio Music Awards	2023	"Smokin out the Window"	R&B Song of the Year	Nominated	
iHeartRadio Music Awards	2023	An Evening with Silk Sonic at Park MGM	Favorite Residency	Nominated	
MTV Europe Music Awards	2021	Silk Sonic (with Bruno Mars)	Best Group	Nominated	
MTV Europe Music Awards	2021	"Leave the Door Open" (with Bruno Mars)	Best Collaboration	Nominated	
Berlin Music Video Awards	2019	Bubblin	Best Director	Nominated	
Soul Train Music Awards	2016	Himself	Best New Artist	Nominated	
Soul Train Music Awards	2016	Himself	Centric Certified Award	Won	
Soul Train Music Awards	2021	"Leave the Door Open" (with Bruno Mars)	Song of the Year	Won	
Soul Train Music Awards	2021	"Leave the Door Open" (with Bruno Mars)	The Ashford & Simpson Songwriter's Award	Won	
Soul Train Music Awards	2021	"Leave the Door Open" (with Bruno Mars)	Video of the Year	Won	
Soul Train Music Awards	2022	An Evening with Silk Sonic	Album of the Year	Nominated	
Soul Train Music Awards	2022	"Smokin out the Window"	Video of the Year	Won	
Soul Train Music Awards	2022	"Smokin out the Window"	Best Dance Performance	Nominated	
Sweden GAFFA Awards	2016	Himself	Best Foreign New Act	Won	
MTV Video Music Awards	2021	"Leave the Door Open" (with Bruno Mars)	Song Of The Year	Nominated	
MTV Video Music Awards	2021	"Leave the Door Open" (with Bruno Mars)	Best R&B	Won	
MTV Video Music Awards	2021	"Leave the Door Open" (with Bruno Mars)	Best Editing	Won	
MTV Video Music Awards	2021	Silk Sonic (with Bruno Mars)	Best Group	Nominated	
MTV Video Music Awards	2022	Silk Sonic (with Bruno Mars)	Group of the Year	Nominated	
NAACP Image Awards	2022	An Evening with Silk Sonic	Outstanding Album	Nominated	
NAACP Image Awards	2022	"Leave the Door Open" (with Bruno Mars)	Outstanding Duo, Group or Collaboration (Traditional)	Won	
NAACP Image Awards	2022	"Leave the Door Open" (with Bruno Mars)	Outstanding Music Video/Visual Album	Nominated	
NAACP Image Awards	2022	"Leave the Door Open" (with Bruno Mars)	Outstanding Soul/R&B Song	Nominated	
NAACP Image Awards	2023	"Love's Train"	Outstanding Duo, Group or Collaboration (Traditional)	Won	
UK Music Video Awards	2026	"Don't Remind Me" (with Amber Mark)	Best R&B / Soul / Jazz Video – International	Nominated	

=== Listicles ===
Name of publisher, year listed, name of listicle, and placement
Publisher	Year	Listicle	Placement	Ref.
Time	2026	Time 100	Placed	
