= List of top 10 singles in 2021 (France) =

This is a list of singles that have peaked in the top 10 of the French Singles Chart in 2021. 77 singles were in the top 10 this year which 16 were on the number-one spot.

== Top 10 singles ==
| Artist(s) | Single | Peak | Peak date | Ref. |
|---|---|---|---|---|
| Booba | "Azerty" | 10 | 2 January | |
| Ed Sheeran | "Afterglow" | 8 | 2 January | |
| Mariah Carey | "All I Want for Christmas Is You" | 1 | 2 January | |
| Julien Doré | "Nous" | 3 | 9 January | |
| Collectif Artistes azuréens 06 | "Nos vallées" | 5 | 16 January | |
| Sia | "Courage to Change" | 8 | 23 January | |
| Cascadeur | "Meaning" | 10 | 6 February | |
| Booba | "Ratpi World" | 4 | 6 February | |
| Hoshi | "Et même après je t'aimerai" | 3 | 13 February | |
| Barbara Pravi | "Voilà" | 1 | 13 February | |
| M. Pokora and Dadju | "Si on disait" | 1 | 20 February | |
| Julien Clerc | "Mon refuge" | 10 | 27 February | |
| Kendji Girac | "Évidemment" | 6 | 27 February | |
| Benjamin Biolay | "Comment est ta peine" | 2 | 27 February | |
| Black Eyed Peas and Shakira | "Girl Like Me" | 2 | 6 March | |
| Orelsan | "Suicide social" | 1 | 6 March | |
| Tayc | "Le temps" | 1 | 13 March | |
| Booba and JSX | "Mona Lisa" | 10 | 20 March | |
| Camille Lellouche | "N'insiste pas" | 4 | 20 March | |
| Grand Corps Malade | "Mesdames" | 1 | 20 March | |
| Gilbert Bécaud | "Je reviens te chercher" | 9 | 27 March | |
| Rosé | "On the Ground" | 7 | 27 March | |
| Les Enfoirés | "Maintenant" | 6 | 27 March | |
| The Weeknd | "Save Your Tears" | 1 | 27 March | |
| Lorenzo de Blanck | "This Is Acid" | 9 | 3 April | |
| Loïc Nottet | "Mr/Mme" | 7 | 3 April | |
| Silk Sonic, Bruno Mars and Anderson .Paak | "Leave the Door Open" | 2 | 3 April | |
| Jason Derulo and Nuka | "Love Not War (The Tampa Beat)" | 8 | 10 April | |
| Lil Nas X | "Montero (Call Me by Your Name)" | 5 | 10 April | |
| Dadju, Gims and Slimane | "Belle" | 4 | 17 April | |
| BTS | "Film Out" | 3 | 17 April | |
| Amel Bent and Hatik | "1, 2, 3" | 2 | 17 April | |
| Justin Bieber featuring Daniel Caesar and Giveon | "Peaches" | 4 | 24 April | |
| Clara Luciani | "Le reste" | 2 | 24 April | |
| Faouzia and John Legend | "Minefields" | 2 | 1 May | |
| Kimberose | "Back on My Feet" | 10 | 15 May | |
| Booba | "Kayna" | 3 | 22 May | |
| Coldplay | "Higher Power" | 2 | 22 May | |
| Frankie Goes to Hollywood | "The Power of Love" | 6 | 29 May | |
| Grand Corps Malade and Louane | "Derrière le brouillard" | 1 | 29 May | |
| Måneskin | "Zitti e buoni" | 9 | 5 June | |
| Vianney | "Dabali" | 7 | 5 June | |
| BTS | "Butter" | 1 | 5 June | |
| Booba | "Plaza Athénée" | 8 | 12 June | |
| Pink and Willow Sage Hart | "Cover Me in Sunshine" | 4 | 12 June | |
| Justin Wellington featuring Small Jam | "Iko Iko (My Bestie)" | 1 | 12 June | |
| Martin Garrix featuring Bono and the Edge | "We Are the People" | 8 | 26 June | |
| Soso Maness featuring PLK | "Petrouchka" | 6 | 26 June | |
| Reik, Rocco Hunt and Ana Mena | "A un Paso de la Luna" | 4 | 26 June | |
| Naps | "La kiffance" | 5 | 3 July | |
| BTS | "Permission to Dance" | 1 | 24 July | |
| Kungs | "Never Going Home" | 1 | 31 July | |
| Ed Sheeran | "Bad Habits" | 1 | 7 August | |
| The Weeknd | "Take My Breath" | 7 | 21 August | |
| Polo & Pan | "Ani Kuni" | 4 | 21 August | |
| Shouse | "Love Tonight" | 2 | 21 August | |
| Elton John and Dua Lipa | "Cold Heart" | 1 | 11 September | |
| Booba | "Variant" | 6 | 18 September | |
| ABBA | "Don't Shut Me Down" | 5 | 18 September | |
| Lisa | "Lalisa" | 8 | 25 September | |
| Angeli | "Le Professionnel" | 5 | 25 September | |
| Ennio Morricone | "Chi Mai" | 3 | 25 September | |
| F. R. David | "Words" | 8 | 2 October | |
| Farruko | "Pepas" | 5 | 9 October | |
| Coldplay and BTS | "My Universe" | 1 | 9 October | |
| Yseult | "Corps" | 9 | 16 October | |
| The Kid Laroi and Justin Bieber | "Stay" | 4 | 16 October | |
| CKay featuring Joeboy and Kuami Eugene | "Love Nwantiti (Ah Ah Ah)" | 3 | 16 October | |
| Stromae | "Santé" | 2 | 30 October | |
| Adele | "Easy on Me" | 1 | 30 October | |
| Ed Sheeran | "Shivers" | 3 | 13 November | |
| Jin | "Yours" | 10 | 20 November | |
| Booba | "Leo Messi" | 8 | 20 November | |
| Grand Corps Malade and Kimberose | "Nos plus belles années" | 2 | 20 November | |
| Orelsan | "L'odeur de l'essence" | 8 | 4 December | |
| Ed Sheeran and Elton John | "Merry Christmas" | 6 | 18 December | |
| Angèle | "Bruxelles je t'aime" | 6 | 1 January | |

== Entries by artists ==
The following table shows artists who achieved two or more top 10 entries in 2021. The figures include both main artists and featured artists and the peak position in brackets.

| Entries | Artist | Singles |
|---|---|---|
| 7 | Booba | "Azerty" (10), "Ratpi World" (4), "Mona Lisa" (10), "Kayna" (3), "Plaza Athénée" (8), "Variant" (6), "Leo Messi" (8) |
| 4 | BTS | "Film Out" (3), "Butter" (1), "Permission to Dance" (1), "My Universe" (1) |
| 4 | Ed Sheeran | "Afterglow" (8), "Bad Habits" (1), "Shivers" (3), "Merry Christmas" (6) |
| 3 | Grand Corps Malade | "Mesdames" (1), "Derrière le brouillard" (1), "Nos plus belles années" (2) |
| 2 | Coldplay | "Higher Power" (2), "My Universe" (1) |
| 2 | Dadju | "Si on disait" (1), "Belle" (4) |
| 2 | Elton John | "Cold Heart" (1), "Merry Christmas" (6) |
| 2 | Justin Bieber | "Peaches" (4), "Stay" (4) |
| 2 | Kimberose | "Back on My Feet" (10), "Nos plus belles années" (2) |
| 2 | Orelsan | "Suicide social" (1), "L'odeur de l'essence" (8) |
| 2 | The Weeknd | "Save Your Tears" (1), "Take My Breath" (7) |

== See also ==
- 2021 in music
- List of number-one hits of 2021 (France)
