= Grammy Award for Best Progressive R&B Album =

Grammy Award Category

- Awarded for: Quality progressive R&B music albums
- Country: United States
- Presented by: The Recording Academy
- First award: 2013
- Currently held by: Durand Bernarr – Bloom (2026)

Highlights
- Most wins: Beyoncé & The Weeknd (2)
- Most nominations: Terrace Martin (4)
- Website: grammy.com

The Grammy Award for Best Progressive R&B Album is an honor presented at the Grammy Awards to recording artists for high quality works on albums in the urban contemporary subgenre within the R&B field. Honors in several categories are presented at the ceremony annually by the Recording Academy of the United States to "honor artistic achievement, technical proficiency and overall excellence in the recording industry, without regard to album sales or chart position".

In 2013, this was one of the three newly created categories for the 55th Annual Grammy Awards as Best Urban Contemporary Album. In June 2020, the Recording Academy announced a renaming and redefining of the category. Its new name was Best Progressive R&B Album, with immediate effect, "to appropriately categorize and describe this subgenre. This change includes a more accurate definition to describe the merit or characteristics of music compositions or performances themselves within the genre of R&B." Adding to this, the description of this category is now as follows: "[t]his category is intended to highlight albums that include the more progressive elements of R&B and may include samples and elements of hip-hop, rap, dance, and electronic music. It may also incorporate production elements found in pop, euro-pop, country, rock, folk, and alternative."

According to Recording Academy president Harvey Mason Jr. in the same press release, these changes reflected "the current state of the music industry and how it's evolved over the past 12 months." In the weeks leading up to this decision, the label "urban" to indicate music made by African American musicians, songwriters and producers had come under fire.

The award goes to the artist, producer and engineer/mixer, provided they are credited with more than 50% of playing time on the album. A producer and engineer with less than 50% of playing time, as well as the mastering engineer, can apply for a "Winners Certificate".

== Controversies ==
Some African American musicians have disputed the use of the term "urban contemporary", seen as a "catchall for music created by Black artists, regardless of genre". In a backstage interview given after his first Grammy win (for Best Rap Album), artist Tyler, the Creator stated that "[i]t sucks that whenever we — and I mean guys that look like me — do anything that's genre-bending or that's anything, they always put it in a rap or urban category", adding that "I don't like that 'urban' word — it's just a politically correct way to say the n-word to me".

== Recipients ==
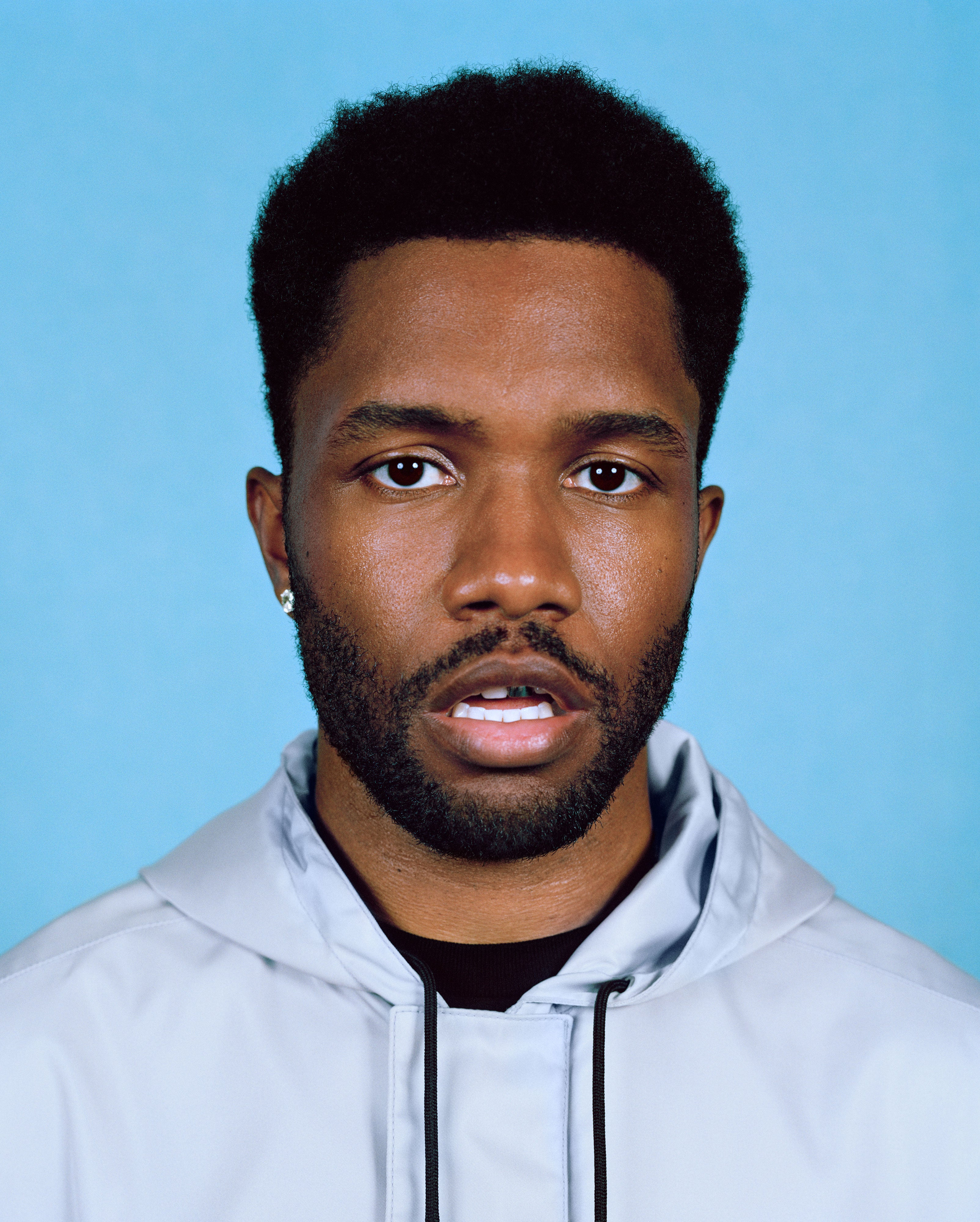
Frank Ocean was the first recipient in 2013

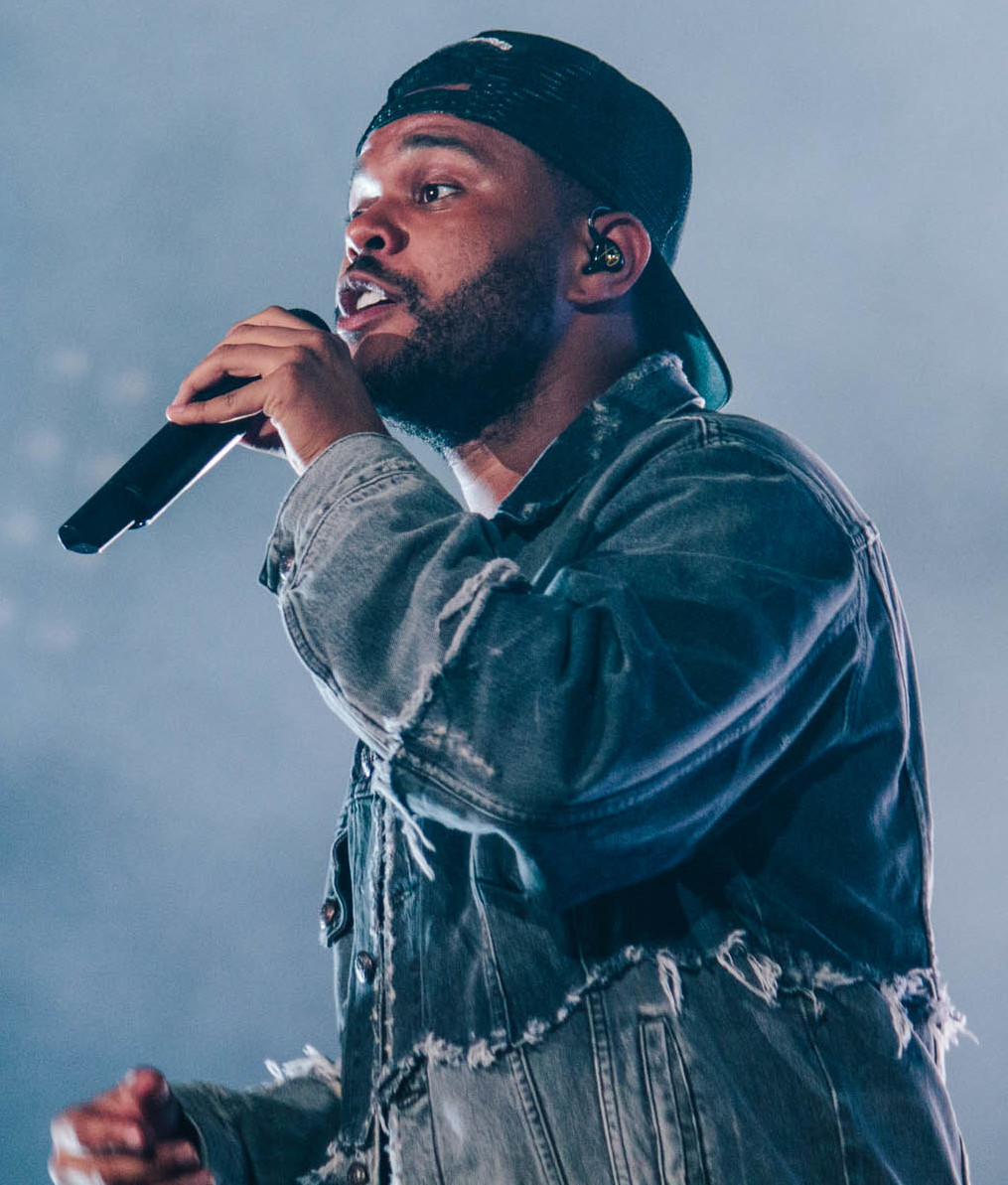
The Weeknd is the first artist to win this award twice, in 2016 and 2018

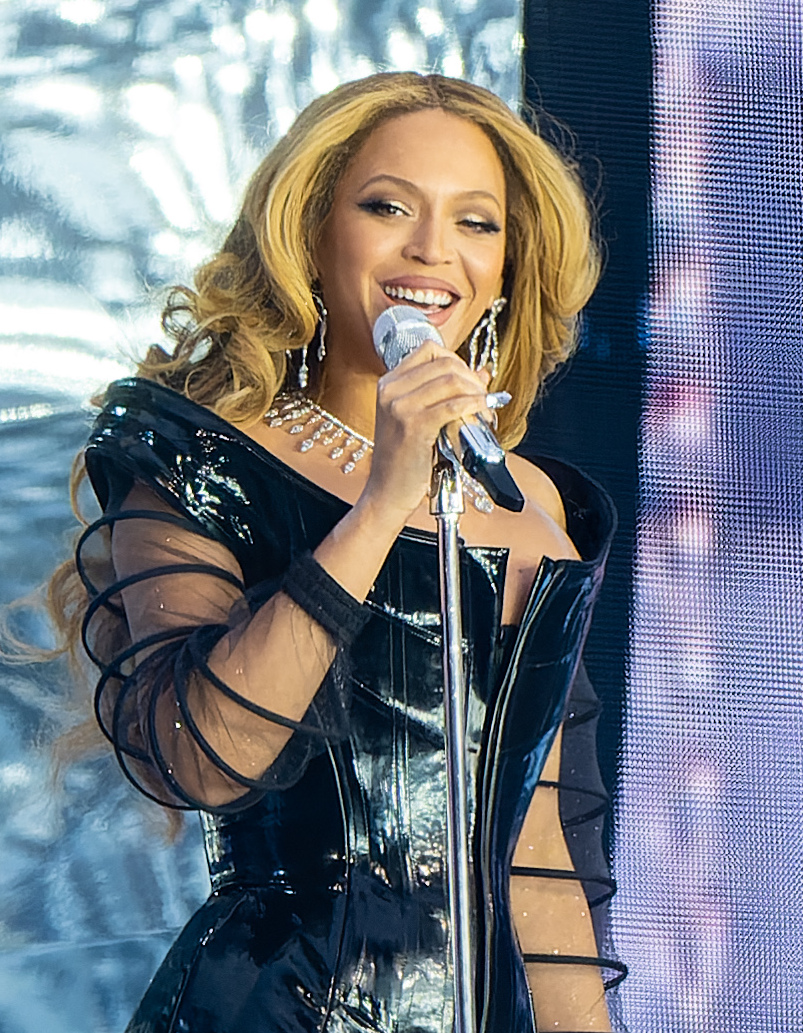
Beyoncé is the first female artist to win this award twice, in 2017 and 2019

=== 2010s ===
Year	Work	Artist
2013	Channel Orange	Frank Ocean
2013	Fortune	Chris Brown
2013	Kaleidoscope Dream	Miguel
2014	Unapologetic	Rihanna
2014	Love and War	Tamar Braxton
2014	New York: A Love Story	Mack Wilds
2014	One: In the Chamber	Salaam Remi
2014	Side Effects of You	Fantasia
2015	Girl	Pharrell Williams
2015	Beyoncé	Beyoncé
2015	Mali Is...	Mali Music
2015	Sail Out	Jhené Aiko
2015	X	Chris Brown
2016	Beauty Behind the Madness	The Weeknd
2016	Blood	Lianne La Havas
2016	Ego Death	The Internet
2016	Wildheart	Miguel
2016	You Should Be Here	Kehlani
2017	Lemonade	Beyoncé
2017	Anti	Rihanna
2017	Malibu	Anderson Paak
2017	Ology	Gallant
2017	We Are King	King
2018	Starboy	The Weeknd
2018	American Teen	Khalid
2018	"Awaken, My Love!"	Childish Gambino
2018	Ctrl	SZA
2018	Free 6lack	6lack
2019	Everything Is Love	The Carters
2019	Chris Dave and the Drumhedz	Chris Dave and the Drumhedz
2019	The Kids Are Alright	Chloe x Halle
2019	Ventriloquism	Meshell Ndegeocello
2019	War & Leisure	Miguel

=== 2020s ===
Year	Work	Artist
2020	Cuz I Love You (Deluxe)	Lizzo
2020	Apollo XXI	Steve Lacy
2020	Being Human in Public	Jessie Reyez
2020	Overload	Georgia Anne Muldrow
2020	Saturn	NAO
2021	It Is What It Is	Thundercat
2021	Chilombo	Jhené Aiko
2021	Free Nationals	Free Nationals
2021	Fuck Yo Feelings	Robert Glasper
2021	Ungodly Hour	Chloe x Halle
2022	Table for Two	Lucky Daye
2022	Dinner Party: Dessert	Terrace Martin, Robert Glasper, 9th Wonder and Kamasi Washington
2022	Mood Valiant	Hiatus Kaiyote
2022	New Light	Eric Bellinger
2022	Something to Say	Cory Henry
2022	Studying Abroad: Extended Stay	Masego
2023	Gemini Rights	Steve Lacy
2023	Drones	Terrace Martin
2023	Operation Funk	Cory Henry
2023	Red Balloon	Tank and the Bangas
2023	Starfruit	Moonchild
2024	SOS	SZA
2024	The Age of Pleasure	Janelle Monáe
2024	The Love Album: Off the Grid	Diddy
2024	Nova	Terrace Martin and James Fauntleroy
2024	Since I Have a Lover	6lack
2025	So Glad to Know You (TIE)	AverySunshine
2025	Why Lawd? (TIE)	NxWorries
2025	Bando Stone & the New World	Childish Gambino
2025	Crash	Kehlani
2025	En Route	Durand Bernarr
2026	Bloom	Durand Bernarr
2026	Access All Areas	FLO
2026	Adjust Brightness	Bilal
2026	Come as You Are	Terrace Martin and Kenyon Dixon
2026	Love on Digital	Destin Conrad
2027	Bernarr	Durand Bernarr
2027	Distracted	Thundercat
2027	The Last Balloon	Tank and the Bangas
2027	Pholks	Leon Thomas
2027	Waves	Moonchild

^{^[I]} Each year is linked to the article about the Grammy Awards held that year.

== Artists with multiple wins ==
2 wins

- Beyoncé (one as The Carters)
- The Weeknd

== Artists with multiple nominations ==
4 nominations

- Terrace Martin

3 nominations

- Durand Bernarr
- Beyoncé (one as The Carters)
- Steve Lacy (one with The Internet)
- Miguel

2 nominations

- Jhené Aiko
- 6lack
- Chris Brown
- Chloe x Halle
- Childish Gambino
- Robert Glasper
- Cory Henry
- Kehlani
- Moonchild
- Anderson Paak
- Rihanna
- SZA
- Tank and the Bangas
- Thundercat
- The Weeknd

== See also ==
- Grammy Award for Best R&B Album
- Grammy Award for Best Contemporary R&B Album
- Progressive soul
