= Petrushka (disambiguation) =

Petrushka is a Russian puppet.

Petrushka may also refer to:

- Petrushka (ballet), a ballet by Igor Stravinsky
- Petrushka (horse), a racehorse
- "Petrouchka" (song), 2021 Soso Maness song

== See also ==
- Petruška or Petruska, people with the surname
- Petrushka chord, a recurring polytonal device used in Igor Stravinsky's ballet Petrushka and in later music
