= Coloratura (song) =

2021 promotional single by Coldplay

Promotional single by Coldplay

from the album Music of the Spheres
- Released: 23 July 2021
- Recorded: 2019–2021
- Genre: Space rock; progressive rock
- Length: 10:18
- Label: Parlophone; Atlantic
- Songwriters: Guy Berryman; Jonny Buckland; Will Champion; Chris Martin; Max Martin; Paris Strother; John Metcalfe; Davide Rossi
- Producers: Max Martin; Oscar Holter; Bill Rahko

Lyric video
- "Coloratura" on YouTube

"Coloratura" is a song by British rock band Coldplay from their ninth studio album, Music of the Spheres. It was released on 23 July 2021 as a promotional single in anticipation for the record, being also its closing track. Produced by Max Martin, Oscar Holter and Bill Rahko, the song is the longest ever released by the band, running at 10 minutes and 18 seconds.

== Background ==
On 20 July 2021, Coldplay announced through their social media that a new album, Music of the Spheres, would be released by the end of the year. In the same statement, they mentioned the closing track was going to be released in three days, while the follow-up single for "Higher Power" would be arriving in September. A lyric video was published along with the song; it was directed by Pilar Zeta and Victor Scorrano, featuring the fictional nebula named after the song.

== Critical reception ==
"Coloratura" has received universal acclaim from critics. Matt Doria from NME praised the track for "echoing the rhapsodic prog-rock vibes of Pink Floyd circa Dark Side of the Moon" and also noted how it marks "an ambitious step into uncharted territory for Coldplay, though not eschewing too far from [their] standard fare". Writing for Rolling Stone, Daniel Kreps described the song as a "space epic" and a "multi-suite voyage into the cosmos, with Chris Martin namechecking celestial bodies [...] along his journey to the stars".

Will Hodgkinson of The Times considered it a "forward-thinking vision of a melodic utopia with shades of Pink Floyd at their most hopeful". Jeremy Levine of PopMatters praised the track for taking "plenty of structural risks that allow it to achieve a surprising level of intimacy. It's still a little lyrically over-the-top, but the variations in tone, as well as the climactic use of the band's retro instrumentation, leave us with a flicker of Coldplay's brilliance". AllMusic's Neil Z. Yeung commented that "while they typically end their albums on a grand, uplifting note, ["Coloratura"] takes the prize for ambition and sheer beauty".

Ella Kemp, writing for Rolling Stone UK, said that the song "might be the most dazzling thing Coldplay have ever done, a sprawling Pink Floyd-esque experiment which pays off infinitely". Ahad Sanwari from V magazine praised the band by noting that "[they] clearly mastered the art of creating a specific atmosphere and mood throughout their music". The track was also listed among the best songs of the year by Dansende Beren, RadioEins, and Tonspion.

== Personnel ==
Personnel adapted from Parlophone UK presented to YouTube.

Coldplay

- Chris Martin – lead vocals, piano, acoustic guitar
- Jonny Buckland – guitar, keyboards
- Guy Berryman – bass
- Will Champion – drums, percussion, backing vocals

Additional personnel

- Davide Rossi – strings
- John Metcalfe – strings
- Jon Hopkins – keyboards
- Max Martin – additional keyboards, drum programmer, additional vocals, producer
- Bill Rahko – theremin, producer
- Dan Green – programmer
- Oscar Holter – keyboards, drum programmer, producer
- Cherif Hashizume – additional programmer
- Paris Strother – synthesizer
- Rik Simpson – additional keyboards, additional vocals
- Randy Merrill – masterer

== Charts ==
Weekly chart performance
| Chart (2021) | Peak position |
|---|---|
| UK Singles Download Chart (OCC) | 65 |
| US Hot Rock & Alternative Songs (Billboard) | 34 |
