= Higher Power (Coldplay song) =

2021 single by Coldplay

Single by Coldplay

from the album Music of the Spheres
- Released: 7 May 2021
- Recorded: 2020
- Genre: Synth-pop
- Length: 3:26 (album version); 3:31 (single version); 3:34 (acoustic version)
- Label: Parlophone; Atlantic
- Songwriters: Guy Berryman; Jonny Buckland; Will Champion; Chris Martin; Max Martin; Federico Vindver; Denise Carite
- Producers: Max Martin; Oscar Holter; Bill Rahko

Coldplay singles chronology
"Orphans" / "Arabesque" (2019)	"Higher Power" (2021)	"My Universe" (2021)

Music video
- "Higher Power" on YouTube

"Higher Power" is a song by British rock band Coldplay from their ninth studio album, Music of the Spheres (2021). It was released as the lead single on 7 May 2021. The song was written by all band members, Federico Vindver and Denise Carite, with production by Max Martin, Oscar Holter and Bill Rahko. It received generally positive reviews from music critics and was nominated for Best Pop Duo/Group Performance at the 64th Annual Grammy Awards. PPL ranked "Higher Power" as the fifth-most played song of the year across British radio and television, the highest position for a band on their chart.

== Background ==
During an interview with Mark Savage of BBC News, lead vocalist Chris Martin, said that the song just dropped out the sky:

"I came up with the title first, but struggled to find the melody and lyrics to go with it. Then one day I was staying in this place and the sink was very resonant. And so I started hitting the sink [to make] this beat... and then I went to the piano keyboard, and the song just landed in one go".

He also explained that "the song is about trying to find the astronaut in all of us, the person that can do amazing things". The singer later told Zoe Ball that the track had intergalactic origins, saying: "We've been trying to imagine what music might sound like on other planets, and try to imagine being those other acts, so we're not thinking of ourselves as being the band Coldplay from England", he explained.

== Production ==
The song was produced by Max Martin, who the band called "a true wonder of the universe". During its first stages, the song was recorded at Hansa Studios, in Berlin, Germany. Due to the COVID-19 pandemic, Martin sent material regularly to the rest of the band, who were working together with Max Martin, but he later joined the group, and most of the track was recorded during this time, later being properly recorded at MixStar Studios, in Virginia Beach, Virginia, United States.

== Promotion ==
On 23 April 2021, a post from an account titled 'Alien Radio FM' on social media released a set of coordinates (51°30'24.6"N 0°08'34.4"W) that led to Green Park in Piccadilly, London. The post included a photo of an advertisement at these coordinates with unknown bright neon purple characters set to a blue background. The characters were quickly decoded by fan sites and said "Coldplay Higher Power May Seven". Similar posts would follow, which all teased the lead single, "Higher Power".

On 29 April 2021, Coldplay confirmed on their social media its title and release date, on 7 May. On 20 July 2021, the band officially announced their ninth studio album Music of the Spheres, revealing that "Higher Power" would be the second song on the album's tracklist. The announcement also stated that an album track, entitled "Coloratura", would be released on 23 July, while the official second single will come out in September.

== Music video ==
An audio visualizer for "Higher Power", which was directed by Paul Dugdale, premiered on Coldplay's YouTube channel at 12:01 a.m. BST on 7 May 2021, coinciding with the single's release. Shot five days before the single's release, It features the band performing on an empty lot as alien holograms dance to the tune. Branded as a form of "extraterrestrial transmission", the band previewed the video to French European Space Agency astronaut Thomas Pesquet aboard the International Space Station prior to its public release. On 19 May, an official lyric video directed by Pilar Zeta and Victor Scorrano was released.

Two weeks later, Coldplay confirmed on their social media that the official version, which was directed by Dave Meyers, would be released on 8 June 2021. The official video was revealed to be the first as part of a three-part "melodic orbit", entitled Music of the Spheres, which was, at the time of release, rumoured to be the title of their ninth album. The phrase also refers to the intro track used in the official video, as well as during the Live at Worthy Farm livestream and their performance at BBC Radio 1's Big Weekend. The video was choreographed by Seoul-based Kim Boram, and features members of his dance troupe, Ambiguous Dance Company.

On the music video, Chris Martin finds himself on a fictional post-apocalyptic planet named "Kaotica" and explores the planet's cities, where he finds animal and bug-like robots, giant holograms, and dances with a group of alien-like holograms. Their heads are instantly covered with blades and they hover in the air, giving Chris a powerful energy, and the rest of Coldplay members (Will Champion, Guy Berryman, Jonny Buckland) appear. It allows him to run in a higher speed and to fly into outer space.

== Live performances ==
On 2 May 2021, the first live performance of "Higher Power" was announced to be held at American Idol's 9 May episode. The Official Charts Company informed on 3 May that the band would perform the track to open the 41st Brit Awards, which was recorded on a barge on the River Thames by The O2 Arena. Coldplay included the song, along with a track titled "Human Heart", on their set for Glastonbury Festival's special livestream event on 22 May, which was filmed at Worthy Farm. On 28 May, BBC Radio 1's Big Weekend released the band's performance of "Higher Power" recorded at Whitby Abbey in North Yorkshire, England. On 16 June, Coldplay performed the acoustic rendition live for the first time on The Tonight Show Starring Jimmy Fallon in New York City. On 11 July, the band performed the song on ASAP Natin 'To as part of their debut on Philippine television. On 25 September, Coldplay co-headlined the Global Citizen Festival in New York's Central Park, opening their set list with "Higher Power". On 23 October, Coldplay opened their set with "Higher Power" during Audacy's 8th annual We Can Survive charity concert held at the Hollywood Bowl in Los Angeles, California.

== Critical reception ==
=== Reviews ===
"Higher Power" received generally positive reviews from music critics. Ella Kemp from NME rated the song 4/5 stars and noted that it "takes everything Chris Martin and co. have learned from a lifetime of dreaming and finally launches their talent into outer space – literally. 'Higher Power' is best appreciated through the sheer force of the melody, giving you the rush of hurtling into the atmosphere [...]. For a band so often shackled by their emotional transparency, [the song] is an exciting leap forward". Halle Kiefer from Vulture noted similarities with Steve Winwood's "Higher Love", while also complimenting the song by saying that "[in] comparison, 'Higher Power' wins out by a few hundred kilometers". The track was nominated for Best Pop Duo/Group Performance at the 64th Annual Grammy Awards on 23 November 2021,

=== Rankings ===
List of critic rankings
Publication	Description	Result	Ref.
3voor12	Songs of the Year 2021	41	
Apple Music	The 100 Best Songs of 2021	80	
Glamour	The 50 Best Songs of 2021	Placed	
NBHAP	Best Songs of 2021	45	
NME	The 50 Best Songs of 2021	44	
Stereogum	The Top 40 Pop Songs of 2021	25	
Tidal	Best of Pop 2021	12	

== Credits and personnel ==
Credits and personnel adapted from Parlophone UK presented to YouTube.

Recording and management

- Recorded and mixed at MixStar Studios (Virginia Beach, Virginia).
- Mastered at Sterling Sound (New York City, New York).
- Published by Parlophone, under exclusive license to Warner Music.

Personnel

- Chris Martin – lead vocals, songwriting, keyboards, percussion
- Jonny Buckland – songwriting, guitar
- Guy Berryman – songwriting, bass guitar
- Will Champion – songwriting, drums, backing vocals
- Max Martin – songwriting, production, keyboards, programming, backing vocals
- Denise Carite – songwriting, choir vocalist
- Federico Vindver – songwriting, keyboards
- Oscar Holter – production, keyboards, programming
- Bill Rahko – production, additional vocals
- Rik Simpson – additional production
- Daniel Green – additional production
- Serban Ghenea – mixing engineer
- Randy Merrill – mastering engineer
- Apple Martin – additional vocals
- John Hanes – engineering
- Michael Ilbert – engineering
- Connor Panayi – assistant engineering
- Duncan Fuller – assistant engineering
- Karl-Ola Kjellholm – assistant engineering
- Linn Fijal – assistant engineering
- Tate McDowell – assistant engineering
- Love Choir – choir arrangement
- Stevie Mackey – choir vocalist
- Dorian Holley – choir vocalist
- Neka Hamilton – choir vocalist

== Charts ==
=== Weekly charts ===
Weekly chart performance
Chart (2021–2024)	Peak position
Argentina Hot 100 (Billboard)	53
Australia (ARIA)	44
Austria (Ö3 Austria Top 40)	51
Belgium (Ultratop 50 Flanders)	1
Belgium (Ultratop 50 Wallonia)	5
Brazil (Top 100 Brasil)	69
Canada Hot 100 (Billboard)	31
Canada CHR/Top 40 (Billboard)	40
Canada Hot AC (Billboard)	35
Canada Rock (Billboard)	30
CIS Airplay (TopHit)	91
Czech Republic Airplay (ČNS IFPI)	1
Czech Republic Singles Digital (ČNS IFPI)	58
Estonia Airplay (TopHit)	199
France (SNEP)	98
Germany (GfK)	35
Global 200 (Billboard)	24
Greece International (IFPI)	57
Hungary (Dance Top 40)	14
Hungary (Rádiós Top 40)	3
Hungary (Single Top 40)	4
Iceland (Tónlistinn)	17
Ireland (IRMA)	20
Israel (Media Forest)	2
Italy (FIMI)	52
Italy Airplay (EarOne)	1
Japan (Japan Hot 100)	61
Latvia (LAIPA)	3
Lithuania (AGATA)	37
Mexico Airplay (Billboard)	29
Netherlands (Dutch Top 40)	11
Netherlands (Single Top 100)	44
New Zealand Hot Singles (RMNZ)	7
Norway (VG-lista)	25
Panama Anglo (Monitor Latino)	4
Poland Airplay (ZPAV)	19
Portugal (AFP)	45
San Marino (SMRRTV Top 50)	1
Singapore (RIAS)	17
Slovakia Airplay (ČNS IFPI)	3
Slovakia Singles Digital (ČNS IFPI)	43
South Korea Download (Circle)	194
Spain (Promusicae)	72
Sweden (Sverigetopplistan)	28
Switzerland (Schweizer Hitparade)	18
UK Singles (Official Charts)	12
US Billboard Hot 100	53
US Adult Contemporary (Billboard)	20
US Adult Pop Airplay (Billboard)	16
US Hot Rock & Alternative Songs (Billboard)	7
US Pop Airplay (Billboard)	34
US Rock & Alternative Airplay (Billboard)	4

=== Year-end charts ===
Year-end chart performance
Chart (2021)	Position
Argentina (Monitor Latino)	48
Belgium (Ultratop Flanders)	21
Belgium (Ultratop Wallonia)	26
Germany (Official German Charts)	78
Hungary (Dance Top 40)	65
Hungary (Rádiós Top 40)	57
Iceland (Tónlistinn)	54
Italy Airplay (EarOne)	2
Netherlands (Dutch Top 40)	52
Switzerland (Schweizer Hitparade)	76
UK Singles (OCC)	100
Uruguay (Monitor Latino)	93
US Adult Top 40 (Billboard)	47
US Hot Rock & Alternative Songs (Billboard)	24
US Rock Airplay (Billboard)	21

Chart (2022)	Position
Belgium (Ultratop Flanders)	181
Hungary (Dance Top 40)	54

== Certifications ==
Certifications
Region	Certification	Certified units/sales
Australia (ARIA)	Platinum	70,000^{‡}
Austria (IFPI Austria)	Platinum	30,000^{‡}
Belgium (BRMA)	Gold	20,000^{‡}
Brazil (Pro-Música Brasil)	Platinum	40,000^{‡}
Canada (Music Canada)	Gold	40,000^{‡}
Denmark (IFPI Danmark)	Gold	45,000^{‡}
France (SNEP)	Platinum	200,000^{‡}
Germany (BVMI)	Gold	200,000^{‡}
Italy (FIMI)	Platinum	100,000^{‡}
New Zealand (RMNZ)	Gold	15,000^{‡}
Poland (ZPAV)	Gold	25,000^{‡}
Portugal (AFP)	Platinum	10,000^{‡}
Spain (Promusicae)	Platinum	60,000^{‡}
United Kingdom (BPI)	Platinum	600,000^{‡}
^{‡} Sales+streaming figures based on certification alone.

== Release history ==
Release dates and formats
Region	Date	Format	Version	Label	Ref.
Various	7 May 2021	CD · digital download · streaming	Original	Parlophone	
Italy	7 May 2021	Contemporary hit radio	Original	Warner	
United States	10 May 2021	Hot adult contemporary	Original	Atlantic	
United States	11 May 2021	Alternative radio	Original	Atlantic	
Australia	14 May 2021	Contemporary hit radio	Original	Atlantic	
Various	20 May 2021	Digital download · streaming	Zhu remix	Parlophone	
Russia	21 May 2021	Contemporary hit radio	Original	Parlophone	
Various	3 June 2021	Digital download · streaming	Tiësto remix	Parlophone	
Various	15 June 2021	Digital download · streaming	Acoustic	Parlophone	
Various	5 July 2021	Digital download · streaming	Alyx Ander remix	Parlophone	

== See also ==
- List of number-one singles of 2021 (Belgium)
- List of top 10 singles in 2021 (France)
- List of number-one songs of the 2020s (Czech Republic)
