= List of number-one albums of 2021 (Spain) =

Top 100 España is a record chart published weekly by PROMUSICAE (Productores de Música de España), a non-profit organization composed of Spanish and multinational record companies. This association tracks both physical (including CDs and vinyl) and digital (digital download and streaming) record consumption and sales in Spain.

== Albums ==
Week	Chart date	Album	Artist(s)	Ref
1	January 1	Vértigo	Pablo Alborán	
2	January 8	11 Razones	Aitana	
3	January 15	11 Razones	Aitana	
4	January 22	Los Dioses	Anuel AA and Ozuna	
5	January 29	Los Dioses	Anuel AA and Ozuna	
6	February 5	Angelus Apatrida	Angelus Apatrida	
7	February 12	Future Nostalgia	Dua Lipa	
8	February 19	Future Nostalgia	Dua Lipa	
9	February 26	El Madrileño	C. Tangana	
10	March 5	El Madrileño	C. Tangana	
11	March 12	El Madrileño	C. Tangana	
12	March 19	El Madrileño	C. Tangana	
13	March 26	El Madrileño	C. Tangana	
14	April 2	El Madrileño	C. Tangana	
15	April 9	El Madrileño	C. Tangana	
16	April 16	V.E.H.N (Viaje épico hacia la nada)	Love of Lesbian	
17	April 23	El Madrileño	C. Tangana	
18	April 30	Mayéutica	Robe	
19	May 7	El Madrileño	C. Tangana	
20	May 14	Sinapsis	Chica Sobresalto	
21	May 21	Sour	Olivia Rodrigo	
22	May 28	Sour	Olivia Rodrigo	
23	June 5	Existencialismo Pop	Fangoria	
24	June 12	El Madrileño	C. Tangana	
25	June 19	Helloween	Helloween	
26	June 26	Vice Versa	Rauw Alejandro	
27	July 3	La Niña	Lola Índigo	
28	July 10	Vice Versa	Rauw Alejandro	
29	July 17	¿A Donde Vamos?	Morat	
30	July 24	Vice Versa	Rauw Alejandro	
31	July 31	Happier Than Ever	Billie Eilish	
32	August 7	Vice Versa	Rauw Alejandro	
33	August 14	Vice Versa	Rauw Alejandro	
34	August 21	Vice Versa	Rauw Alejandro	
35	August 28	Vice Versa	Rauw Alejandro	
36	September 4	Senjutsu	Iron Maiden	
37	September 11	Bandera Negra	Mägo de Oz	
38	September 18	Jose	J Balvin	
39	September 25	Cada Vez Cadáver	Fito & Fitipaldis	
40	October 2	Cada Vez Cadáver	Fito & Fitipaldis	
41	October 9	Cada Vez Cadáver	Fito & Fitipaldis	
42	October 16	Music of the Spheres	Coldplay	
43	October 23	Mil Batallas	Malú	
44	October 30	=	Ed Sheeran	
45	November 6	Likes y Cicatrices	Melendi	
46	November 13	No, No Vuelve	Dani Martín	
47	November 20	30	Adele	
48	November 27	Cable a Tierra	Vetusta Morla	
49	December 3	Cuando Te Muerdes el Labio	Leiva	
50	December 10	Sanz	Alejandro Sanz	
51	December 17	Sanz	Alejandro Sanz	
52	December 24	Sanz	Alejandro Sanz	
1	December 31	Sanz	Alejandro Sanz	
