= Petruška =

Petruška or Petruska is a surname. Notable people with the surname include:

- András Petruska (born 1986), Hungarian singer
- Patrik Petruška (born 1991), Czech ice hockey player
- Richard Petruška (born 1969), Slovak-Italian basketball player

== See also ==
- Petrushka (disambiguation)
