= My Universe (song) =

2021 song by Coldplay and BTS

Single by Coldplay and BTS

from the album Music of the Spheres
- Language: English; Korean
- Released: 24 September 2021
- Recorded: August 2020
- Genre: Pop rock; synth-pop; disco-pop
- Length: 3:46 (album version); 3:48 (single version); 3:15 (radio edit)
- Label: Parlophone; Atlantic
- Songwriters: Guy Berryman; Jonny Buckland; Will Champion; Chris Martin; Max Martin; Oscar Holter; Bill Rahko; RM; Suga; J-Hope
- Producers: Max Martin; Oscar Holter; Bill Rahko

Coldplay singles chronology
"Higher Power" (2021)	"My Universe" (2021)	"Let Somebody Go" (2022)

BTS singles chronology
"Permission to Dance" (2021)	"My Universe" (2021)	"Yet to Come (The Most Beautiful Moment)" (2022)

Music video
- "My Universe" on YouTube

"My Universe" is a song recorded by British rock band Coldplay and South Korean pop group BTS. It was released on 24 September 2021 through Parlophone and Atlantic, serving as the second official single from Coldplay's ninth studio album, Music of the Spheres. It debuted at number one on the Billboard Hot 100, becoming BTS' sixth US chart-topper and Coldplay's second after 2008's "Viva la Vida". The single is also the first track by two co-billed lead groups to top the list and the first song by a British group to debut at number one in Billboard Hot 100 history.

"My Universe" received positive reviews from music critics. It premiered at number three in the UK Singles Chart, claiming the second-biggest week of the year in downloads, and eventually becoming the most downloaded song of 2021 by a group in the country. The track also reached number one in Hungary, Malaysia and Singapore; the top ten in Australia, Belgium, Canada, India, Ireland, and South Korea; and the top twenty of twelve other countries, including Germany, The Netherlands, Norway, and New Zealand.

The official music video, directed by Dave Meyers, was released on 30 September 2021 and features both groups performing on different futuristic planets (Floris, Calypso, and Supersolis) alongside a fictional band named "Supernova 7" via the "Holoband" technology developed by DJ Lafrique, set in an era where music is banned around the universe.

== Background ==
"About 18 months ago I got a message from somebody, they said, ‘BTS want to a do a song with you’ and I said, ‘How would that work? I didn’t understand how that could be possible. [...] My friend said the phrase ‘my universe’ one day and I wrote down ‘my universe’ and I felt that’s a cool title. Then I took it to my friend and said, ‘OK let’s do a demo with BTS’.”

— Chris Martin mentioned how "My Universe" started out, Coldplay X BTS Inside 'My Universe' Documentary

The title of the song was first announced as part of the track listing release of Music of the Spheres in July 2021 without any mention of the song featuring BTS. A snippet of the song was included in a trailer titled "Overtura", also omitting any evidence of the Korean group being involved. On 13 September 2021, the song was revealed to be a collaboration between Coldplay and BTS. The single was announced through a coded message on Coldplay's Alien Radio FM social media account. Following the release of the "Permission to Dance" music video in early July 2021, the groups first collaborated during an episode of the YouTube series Released, during which they joined a discussion with Coldplay's frontman Chris Martin on what inspired the "#PermissionToDance Challenge". However, speculations about a collaboration between the two groups had already started circulating in February 2021, after BTS covered their 2005 hit song "Fix You" on MTV Unplugged. On 26 September, the Inside My Universe making-of documentary of the song was released, alongside a "Supernova 7" remix and an acoustic version. A third remix, done by Suga of BTS, was released on 18 October. Additional remixes by Galantis and David Guetta were released in November. Following the collaboration, Coldplay also wrote a song with BTS member Jin titled "The Astronaut".

== Music and lyrics ==
"My Universe" is a synth-pop track, co-written by Martin, Guy Berryman, Jonny Buckland, and Will Champion of Coldplay, as well as BTS members J-Hope, RM, and Suga, as well as Bill Rahko, Oscar Holter, and Max Martin. The lyrics are in both English and Korean. Coldplay originally wrote the song for BTS, but the songwriting process was revised to include the South Korean septet. My Universe is set to a 4/4 common time signature, with a moderately fast tempo of 105 beats per minute. It is written in the key of E major, with the BTS vocal range spanning from the note F♯_{3} to the note B_{5}. The upbeat gives the synth-rock of Coldplay and the dance-pop of BTS an EDM twist. Coldplay introduces a loud electro-dance outro just before the song ends. Lyrically, the song discusses choosing love above differences with a line like, "And they said that we can't be together because, because we come from different sides." But in the chorus, they dismiss doubters: "You, you are my universe, and I just want to put you first."

== Commercial performance ==
"My Universe" debuted at the top of the Billboard Hot 100 on the chart dating 9 October 2021, with 11.5 million streams, 5.5 million audience impressions from radio airplay, and 127,000 downloads and physical single sales combined. It became BTS' fifth song to achieve the feat, breaking the record for the most first-week number-ones by a group. They also tied Ariana Grande and Drake overall. "My Universe" was also the first track by two lead groups to reach the top of the ranking. Furthermore, Coldplay became the first British group in history to debut at number one on the Hot 100 and scored their first chart-topping single since "Viva la Vida" (2008).

In addition, "My Universe" topped both the Billboard Global 200 and the Billboard Global Excl charts. U.S. charts. Between 24 and 30 September, the song received 95.4 million streaming and 142,400 downloads globally, with 84.4 million streams and 90,500 downloads occurring outside of the United States. It is BTS's fifth No. 1 on the Global Excl. chart and sixth on the Global 200. Coldplay's debut at No.1 on both charts comes in the U.S. The song also debuts at No. 1 on the Digital Song Sales list, making BTS the group with the most consecutive No. 1 songs on the chart with nine. The song debuted at the top of the Hot Rock & Alternative Songs and Hot Alternative Songs charts and peaked at No. 21 on the Streaming Songs list, No. 23, Alternative Airplay, No. 29, Adult Pop Airplay, and No. 33 on Pop Airplay.

"My Universe" was the top new entry for the week of 1–7 October which debuted at No. 3 on the Official Singles Chart. Notably, with a total of 27,000 pure sales, the single was the best-selling of the week in both physical CDs and digital downloads. The song's 21,400 digital downloads gave it the largest week of downloads of any song this year in the UK. On Oricon's weekly digital singles chart, the song debuted at No. 1. The day after it was released, the song debuted on Spotify's Global Top 200 at No. 3.

== Music video ==
A space-themed lyric video, featuring animated handwritten lyrics from both bands in English and Korean, was released together with the song on 24 September 2021. Additional visualizers for the instrumental and three remix versions of the track were published in the following days.

A scene in music video where BTS, Coldplay, and Supernova7 are able to play together using the Holoband.

A music video directed by Dave Meyers was released on 30 September 2021. Set in the Spheres planetary system, where music has been banned by the "Silencers", who appeared in Coldplay's 2011 album Mylo Xyloto. The video depicts Coldplay, BTS, and the fictional alien band Supernova 7 performing "My Universe" together. Though located on different planets, the three groups are united as holograms through "HOLOBAND" technology controlled by alien DJ Lafrique, who broadcasts their performance throughout the system from her radio ship while being hunted by the Silencers. Coldplay filmed the video at an empty, abandoned municipal swimming pool complex in Rubí, Barcelona, in July 2021. The BTS portion was shot on a green-screen stage at a studio in Seoul, South Korea, two weeks after the Barcelona shoot. The green screen was useful to make the visual effects, such as the groups' holographic versions, and to unite the scenes from both groups.

== Critical reception ==
Rhian Daly from NME has rated the song with four stars out of five, calling it "a celestial ode to unity, hope and the power of love". She then opined that, while some might view the track as an unusual pairing, the two acts "makes complete sense" together because "both share a predilection for a poetic and heartfelt approach to their music; as well as being two of the biggest bands in the world, they are also two of modern pop's deepest thinkers, imbuing their lyrics with touching statements on love and life". The Harvard Crimson's Ava J. Salzman declared that "My Universe" illustrates "a union between two groups that bridge divides, creating cross-cultural art in a time when it is most necessary". Billboard (45) and Rolling Stone (62) ranked it among the greatest BTS songs, while Billboard Italy named it one of the best international collaborations of 2021.

== Accolades ==
The song received five non-consecutive Melon Weekly Popularity Awards in South Korea.

List of awards and nominations
Year	Ceremony	Category	Result	Ref.
2021	Buenos Aires Music Video Festival (Note: The Buenos Aires Music Video Festival was established in 2019 to honour excellence in music video craft around the world based on a peer-voted selection process.)	Favorite Video	Nominated	
2021	Buenos Aires Music Video Festival	Favorite Kpop Video	Nominated	
2021	Buenos Aires Music Video Festival	Best Lyric Video	Nominated	
2021	Guinness World Records	Highest Debut by a UK Group in the US Singles Chart (Note: Coldplay debuted at number one while the record belonged to One Direction's "Live While We're Young" (2012) at number three.)	Won	
2021	MAMA Awards	Best Collaboration	Nominated	
2021	MAMA Awards	Song of the Year	Nominated	
2021	Melon Music Awards	Best Collaboration	Won	
2021	MTV Video Music Awards Japan	Best Collaboration Video – International	Won	
2021	MUSA Awards	International Collaboration of the Year	Won	
2021	NRJ Music Awards	International Collaboration of the Year	Won	
2021	People's Choice Awards	The Music Video of 2021	Nominated	
2021	Planeta Awards	Best Collaboration	Won	
2022	Art Directors Guild Awards	Short Format – Webseries or Music Video (François Audouy)	Nominated	
2022	Billboard Music Awards	Top Rock Song	Nominated	
2022	Circle Chart Music Awards	Song of the Year – Digital Music: September	Won	
2022	Gaffa Awards (Sweden)	Best Foreign Song	Nominated	
2022	Japan Gold Disc Awards	Song of the Year by Download – Western	Won	
2022	Joox Malaysia Music Awards	International Top 5 Hits	Won	
2022	Kids' Choice Awards Mexico	International Hit of the Year	Won	
2022	MTV Millennial Awards	Global Hit of the Year	Won	
2022	MTV Millennial Awards Brazil	Global Hit of the Year	Won	
2022	MTV Video Music Awards	Best Visual Effects	Nominated	
2022	NME Awards	Best Collaboration	Nominated	
2022	NMPA Songwriting Awards	Platinum Award	Won	
2022	Rockbjörnen Awards	Foreign Song of the Year	Nominated	
2022	RTHK International Pop Poll Awards	Top Ten International Gold Song	Nominated	
2022	Set Decorators Society of America Awards	Best Achievement in Décor/Design of a Short Format (Joan Sabaté and Patrick Tatopoulos)	Nominated	
2023	Grammy Awards	Best Pop Duo/Group Performance	Nominated	

== Live performances ==
On 23 September 2021, a day before the song was officially released, Coldplay performed "My Universe" on Pandora's Small Stage Series at the Apollo Theater in New York City. Chris Martin performed a short acoustic rendition of the song as a preview during his guest appearance on The Kelly Clarkson Show, which aired the following day. On 25 September, the band performed the song at the Global Citizen Festival in New York's Central Park, with BTS appearing virtually via a pre-recorded video that played onscreen behind them. Martin also attempted to sing some of BTS' Korean verses. The following month, the band performed the song during their guest appearance on The Graham Norton Show on 15 October, at the 2021 Earthshot Prize ceremony at Alexandra Palace in London two days later (in which 60 cyclists pedalling on bikes provided the power for their performance), and as part of their closing set for Audacy's 8th annual We Can Survive charity concert held at the Hollywood Bowl in Los Angeles on 23 October.

Coldplay and BTS performed "My Universe" for the first time together at the 2021 American Music Awards on 21 November at the Microsoft Theater in Los Angeles. On 2 December, Martin joined BTS to perform the song at the latter's Permission to Dance on Stage concert at SoFi Stadium in Inglewood, California.

== Track listing ==
CD and Digital Single

- My Universe – 3:50
- My Universe (instrumental) – 3:49

Digital (Suga's Remix)

- My Universe (Suga's Remix) – 3:08

Digital Single

- My Universe (Acoustic Version) – 3:43
- My Universe (Supernova 7 Mix) – 4:39
- My Universe – 3:46

Digital (Galantis Remix)

- My Universe (Galantis Remix) – 3:44

Digital (David Guetta Remix)

- My Universe (David Guetta Remix) – 3:19

== Personnel ==
- Coldplay – lead artist
  - Guy Berryman – bass, keyboards, remixer (Supernova 7 Mix)
  - Jonny Buckland – guitar, keyboards
  - Will Champion – drums, percussion
  - Chris Martin – vocals, guitar, keyboards
- BTS – co-lead artist, vocals
- Amber Strother – additional vocals
- Jacob Collier – additional vocals
- Bill Rahko – keyboards, programming, production, additional vocals
- Daniel Green – keyboards, programming, additional production
- Max Martin – keyboards, programming, production, additional vocals
- Oscar Holter – guitar, keyboards, programming, production
- Pdogg – vocal recording engineering, production engineering
- Randy Merrill – mastering
- Rik Simpson – additional production
- Tate McDowell – additional vocals
- The Dream Team – additional production
- Serban Ghenea – mixing engineering
- Michael Ilbert – engineering
- John Hanes – engineering
- Miguel Lara – engineering
- Emma Marks – assistant engineering
- Duncan Fuller – assistant engineering
- Connor Panayi – assistant engineering

== Charts ==
=== Weekly charts ===
Weekly chart performance
Chart (2021–2023)	Peak position
Argentina Hot 100 (Billboard)	36
Australia (ARIA)	7
Austria (Ö3 Austria Top 40)	29
Belgium (Ultratop 50 Flanders)	7
Belgium (Ultratop 50 Wallonia)	6
Bolivia (Monitor Latino)	9
Bulgaria (PROPHON)	9
Canada Hot 100 (Billboard)	9
Canada CHR/Top 40 (Billboard)	43
CIS Airplay (TopHit)	35
Colombia (Promúsica)	9
Costa Rica (Fonotica)	3
Croatia (ARC 100)	5
Czech Republic Airplay (ČNS IFPI)	4
Czech Republic Singles Digital (ČNS IFPI)	23
Denmark (Tracklisten)	13
Dominican Republic (SODINPRO)	35
El Salvador (ASAP EGC)	6
Estonia Airplay (TopHit)	127
Euro Digital Song Sales (Billboard)	1
Finland Airplay (Radiosoittolista)	3
France (SNEP)	33
Germany (GfK)	13
Global 200 (Billboard)	1
Greece International (IFPI)	25
Hungary (Rádiós Top 40)	18
Hungary (Single Top 40)	1
Iceland (Tónlistinn)	14
India International Singles (IMI)	3
Indonesia (Billboard)	16
Ireland (IRMA)	10
Italy (FIMI)	29
Italy Airplay (EarOne)	1
Japan (Japan Hot 100)	3
Japan (Oricon Combined Singles)	11
Lebanon (Lebanese Top 20)	20
Lithuania (AGATA)	16
Luxembourg (Billboard)	22
Malaysia (RIM)	1
Mexico (AMPROFON)	5
Mexico Airplay (Billboard)	2
Netherlands (Dutch Top 40)	9
Netherlands (Single Top 100)	20
New Zealand (Recorded Music NZ)	17
Nigeria (TurnTable Top 100)	47
Norway (VG-lista)	14
Panama (Monitor Latino)	3
Peru (UNIMPRO)	1
Philippines (Billboard)	14
Poland Airplay (ZPAV)	5
Portugal (AFP)	21
Romania (Airplay 100)	42
Russia Airplay (TopHit)	77
San Marino (SMRRTV Top 50)	3
Singapore (RIAS)	1
Slovakia Airplay (ČNS IFPI)	2
Slovakia Singles Digital (ČNS IFPI)	17
South Africa (RISA)	48
South Korea (Gaon)	2
Spain (PROMUSICAE)	63
Sweden (Sverigetopplistan)	19
Switzerland (Schweizer Hitparade)	11
Ukraine Airplay (TopHit)	44
UK Singles (Official Charts)	3
Uruguay (Monitor Latino)	12
US Billboard Hot 100	1
US Adult Contemporary (Billboard)	16
US Adult Pop Airplay (Billboard)	8
US Hot Rock & Alternative Songs (Billboard)	1
US Pop Airplay (Billboard)	18
US Rock & Alternative Airplay (Billboard)	10
US Rolling Stone Top 100	1
Vietnam (Vietnam Hot 100)	4

=== Monthly charts ===
Monthly chart performance
Chart (2021)	Peak position
CIS Airplay (TopHit)	44
Russia Airplay (TopHit)	89
South Korea (Gaon)	5

=== Year-end charts ===
Year-end chart performance
Chart (2021)	Position
Argentina (Monitor Latino)	89
Belgium (Ultratop Flanders)	80
Belgium (Ultratop Wallonia)	80
CIS Airplay (TopHit)	200
Global 200 (Billboard)	154
Hungary (Single Top 40)	43
Iceland (Tónlistinn)	84
Italy Airplay (EarOne)	22
Netherlands (Dutch Top 40)	53
Poland (Polish Airplay Top 100)	85
South Korea (Gaon)	92
Switzerland (Schweizer Hitparade)	94
US Hot Rock & Alternative Songs (Billboard)	18

Chart (2022)	Position
Argentina (Monitor Latino)	8
Australia (ARIA)	85
Belgium (Ultratop Flanders)	40
Belgium (Ultratop Wallonia)	72
Bolivia (Monitor Latino)	22
Brazil (Pro-Música Brasil)	194
Canada (Canadian Hot 100)	96
Chile (Monitor Latino)	18
Costa Rica (Monitor Latino)	20
El Salvador (Monitor Latino)	79
France (SNEP)	113
Germany (Official German Charts)	86
Global 200 (Billboard)	25
Iceland (Tónlistinn)	70
Lithuania (AGATA)	89
Mexico (Monitor Latino)	91
Panama (Monitor Latino)	19
Paraguay (Monitor Latino)	70
Portugal (AFP)	84
South Korea (Circle)	75
Switzerland (Schweizer Hitparade)	77
Uruguay (Monitor Latino)	26
US Adult Contemporary (Billboard)	38
US Adult Top 40 (Billboard)	35
US Digital Song Sales (Billboard)	47
US Hot Rock & Alternative Songs (Billboard)	16
Vietnam (Vietnam Hot 100)	59

== Certifications and sales ==
Certifications and sales
Region	Certification	Certified units/sales
Australia (ARIA)	Platinum	70,000^{‡}
Austria (IFPI Austria)	Platinum	30,000^{‡}
Brazil (Pro-Música Brasil)	Diamond	160,000^{‡}
Canada (Music Canada)	2× Platinum	160,000^{‡}
Denmark (IFPI Danmark)	Platinum	90,000^{‡}
France (SNEP)	Diamond	333,333^{‡}
Germany (BVMI)	Gold	200,000^{‡}
Italy (FIMI)	2× Platinum	200,000^{‡}
Mexico (AMPROFON)	3× Platinum	420,000^{‡}
New Zealand (RMNZ)	2× Platinum	60,000^{‡}
Poland (ZPAV)	Platinum	50,000^{‡}
Portugal (AFP)	2× Platinum	20,000^{‡}
South Korea	—	4,966 (Note: South Korean physical sales for "My Universe" as of May 2022.)
Spain (Promusicae)	2× Platinum	120,000^{‡}
Switzerland (IFPI Switzerland)	2× Platinum	40,000^{‡}
United Kingdom (BPI)	Platinum	600,000^{‡}
United States (RIAA)	Platinum	1,000,000^{‡}
Streaming
Japan (RIAJ)	Gold	50,000,000^{†}
Sweden (GLF)	Platinum	8,000,000^{†}
^{‡} Sales+streaming figures based on certification alone.^{†} Streaming-only figures based on certification alone.

== Release history ==
Release dates and formats
Region	Date	Format	Version	Label	Ref.
Various	24 September 2021	2×CD · digital download · streaming	Original	Parlophone	
Various	24 September 2021	2×CD · digital download · streaming	Instrumental	Parlophone	
Italy	24 September 2021	Contemporary hit radio	Original	Warner	
Various	27 September 2021	Digital download; streaming	Acoustic	Parlophone	
Various	27 September 2021	Digital download; streaming	Supernova 7 mix	Parlophone	
United States	28 September 2021	Contemporary hit radio	Original	Atlantic	
Russia	29 September 2021	Contemporary hit radio	Original	Parlophone	
United States	5 October 2021	Alternative radio	Original	Atlantic	
Various	18 October 2021	Digital download; streaming	Suga's remix	Parlophone	
Various	5 November 2021	Digital download; streaming	Galantis remix	Parlophone	
Various	19 November 2021	Digital download; streaming	David Guetta remix	Parlophone	

== See also ==
- List of Billboard Global 200 number ones of 2021
- List of Billboard Hot 100 number ones of 2021
- List of number-one songs of 2021 (Malaysia)
- List of number-one songs of 2021 (Singapore)
- List of top 10 singles for 2021 in Australia
- List of top 10 singles in 2021 (France)
- List of top 10 singles in 2008 (Ireland)
- List of UK top-ten singles in 2021
