= Music of the Spheres (Coldplay album) =

- Standard edition cover

Studio album by Coldplay
- Released: 15 October 2021
- Recorded: 2019–2021
- Genres: Pop; pop rock; synth-pop; space rock; ambient
- Length: 41:50
- Languages: English; Korean
- Labels: Parlophone; Atlantic
- Producers: Max Martin; Oscar Holter; Federico Vindver; Bill Rahko; Rik Simpson; Dan Green; Jon Hopkins; We Are King; Metro Boomin; Jacob Collier

Coldplay chronology
Everyday Life (2019)	Music of the Spheres (2021)	Moon Music (2024)

Singles from Music of the Spheres
- 1. "Higher Power" Released: 7 May 2021; 2. "My Universe" Released: 24 September 2021; 3. "Let Somebody Go" Released: 7 February 2022

Music of the Spheres (subtitled Vol. I: From Earth with Love) is the ninth studio album by British rock band Coldplay. Released on 15 October 2021 by Parlophone in the United Kingdom and Atlantic in the United States, the album was produced by Max Martin, who is a new producer to the band's discography. It features guest appearances from Selena Gomez, We Are King, Jacob Collier and BTS, as well as returning contributions from electronic producer Jon Hopkins.

Music of the Spheres is the band's second concept album, after 2011's Mylo Xyloto. The album explores pop, pop rock, space rock, space music and ambient influences. It is set in a fictional planetary system called The Spheres, which contains nine planets, three natural satellites, a star and a nebula, with each one of them corresponding to a certain track on the record. According to lead singer Chris Martin, its concept and themes were not only based on Mylo Xyloto, but also inspired by the Star Wars film franchise, which made him and the other band members wonder what other artists could be like across the universe, while also using the planets as a canvas to explore human experience.

In anticipation for the album, Coldplay released "Higher Power" and "My Universe" as singles, with the former being nominated for Best Pop Duo/Group Performance at the 64th Annual Grammy Awards, and the latter being nominated for the same award at the following year's ceremony. "My Universe" also debuted at number one in the Billboard Hot 100 chart, making Coldplay the first British group in history to achieve the feat. "Let Somebody Go" was later released as the third official single on 7 February 2022. "Coloratura", "People of the Pride", "Biutyful" and a live version of "Humankind" were served as promotional singles.

Music of the Spheres received mixed reviews from critics, many of whom criticised the album's overtly pop sensibilities and style. The album's closing song, "Coloratura", however, was acclaimed for its lengthy, unconventional structure and production. The album was nominated for Album of the Year and Best Pop Vocal Album at the 65th Annual Grammy Awards, marking the band's third nomination in both categories. It became the first album of the 2020s to debut atop the UK Albums Chart with more than 100,000 units. To support the record, Coldplay embarked on the Music of the Spheres World Tour and released an accompanying concert film. It was the first volume of the Music of the Spheres series, the second being Moon Music (2024).

== Background ==
The idea for a space-themed record had been envisioned by the band since 2010, when lead vocalist Chris Martin proposed a project of building "a solar system", as stated in a blog published by the band, named "Roadie #42". This project eventually led to the creation of the universe for Coldplay's 2011 album Mylo Xyloto, which would go on to inspire the Music of the Spheres universe as well. At the time Everyday Life was released, in November 2019, one of the hints was hidden within the bifold of the booklet of the physical vinyl and digibook editions of the album, in which a black and white billboard in a field advertises "Music of the Spheres". In the bottom left corner, smaller writing says "Coldplay coming soon". This, combined with the band's history of teasers for future material, fueled speculation about Music of the Spheres's themes and release date. Other hints to future material were purportedly hidden within song lyrics and music videos from the Everyday Life era.

== Recording ==
According to bassist Guy Berryman, when the band "made [2019's] Everyday Life, we knew we weren't planning on touring it, so that directed the course of that album musically. The idea was always to follow that up with Music of the Spheres, which definitely would be toured. So the new album was created with one eye on the live performances. I think that shaped the overall energy levels and song selections for the album". The record was produced by Max Martin, whom the band called "a true wonder of the universe". Their first work together was in the single "Orphans". He met Chris during a Rihanna concert in Sweden in 2016 and they started to share potential about possible collaborations, with the rest of the band sharing the same feeling and considering him as a "new band member" for the album.

Chris stated Max was very involved on most of the creative process, helping to decide which songs would be chosen as well. He added that "just before 'Higher Power', I'd done a whole session with him auditioning songs for a potential album". Drummer Will Champion noted one of the reasons of feeling certain relief while working with Max "is that he is very conscious of not filling too many gaps", with Berryman further adding that a sound "will not be impressive by just adding another layer of sound and another layer of sound", comparing it to a mix of "too many colors together, [but] you always end up with brown". They cited "Humankind" as an example, which was according to them was the hardest song to be recorded in the album, as the band "couldn't get the feel of it right until the end of the sessions".

== Style and concept ==
Music of the Spheres has been described as pop, pop rock, synth-pop, space rock, space music, electropop, soft rock, and ambient. Lead singer Chris Martin stated that the theme for the album was inspired by "wonder[ing] what musicians would be like across the universe" after watching the fictional Mos Eisley cantina band perform in Star Wars and making speculations in relation to outer space sounds.

The album is set in a fictional planetary system called The Spheres, which consists of nine planets, three natural satellites, one star and a nearby nebula. Each track on the album represents a celestial body from The Spheres. Following the album's track listing, they are: Neon Moon I ("Music of the Spheres"), Kaotica ("Higher Power"), Echo ("Humankind"), Kubik ("Alien Choir"), Calypso ("Let Somebody Go"), Supersolis ("Human Heart"), Ultra ("People of the Pride"), Floris ("Biutyful"), Neon Moon II ("Music of the Spheres II"), Epiphane ("My Universe"), Infinity Station ("Infinity Sign"), and Coloratura ("Coloratura"). Supersolis is the star at the centre of the system, and Coloratura is the Nebula. Each celestial body in The Spheres has its own language: EL 1 for Neon Moon I, Kaotican for Kaotica, Mirror Text for Echo, Qblok for Kubik, Aquamarine for Calypso, Supersolar for Supersolis, Voltik for Ultra, Bloom for Floris, EL 2 for Neon Moon II, Spheric for Epiphane, Infinitum for Infinity Station, and Coloraturan for Coloratura. An unnamed natural satellite orbits Echo, while both Neon Moons orbit Epiphane. A lost planet named Aurora is also part of the system, and although no song on the album represents it, fans have theorised that the short instrumental "A Wave", which was played at the end of concerts during the first leg of the Music of the Spheres World Tour and would later appear on the Full Moon edition of Moon Music, is connected to it. The artwork featuring the planetary system was created by Pilar Zeta, who had worked on Coldplay's previous two albums Everyday Life and A Head Full of Dreams (2015).

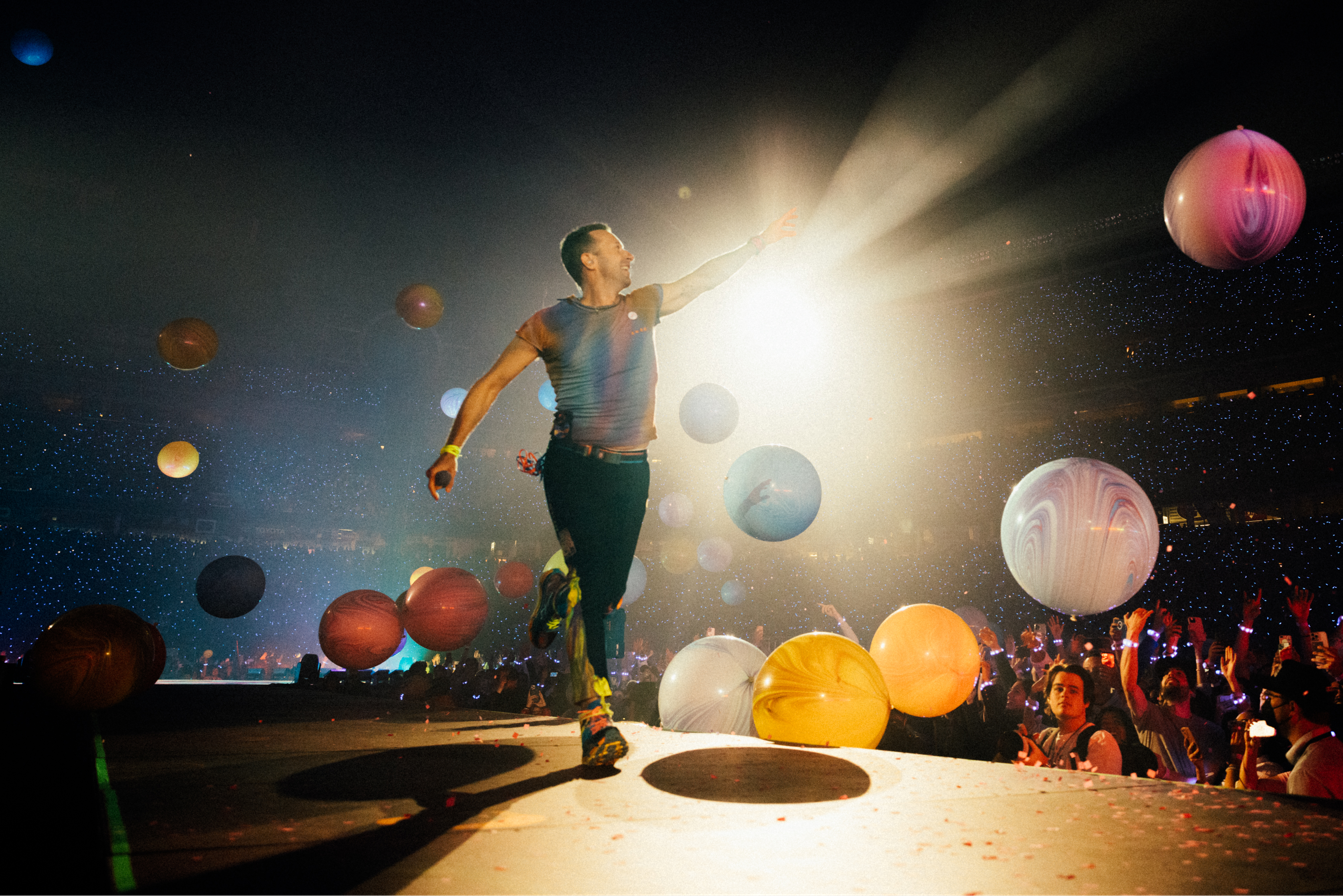
The album was conceived with live performances in mind.

Martin uses the planets as a canvas to explore the human experience: "It's really another record about life as a human person, but given this freedom that comes when you pretend it's about other creatures in other places". Drummer Will Champion stated that Everyday Life was about making big questions personal, while Music of the Spheres promoted more about the purpose of the band in relation to humanity and manmade demarcations, saying: "We historically as a band tend to fill space". The album was promoted with the words "Everyone is an alien somewhere", which, according to Champion, was about people looking to what unites them, not to what separates them, saying: "From the perspective from another planet, we would be the aliens. We searched the perspective where we are all equal".

The fictional universe for Music of the Spheres is in part inspired by the universe created by the band for Mylo Xyloto, and, according to creative director Phil Harvey, features several references to it. One of these references may be the appearance of the Mylo Xyloto "silencers" in the music video for "My Universe".

== Promotion ==
On 23 April 2021, a post from an account titled 'Alien Radio FM' on social media released a set of coordinates (51°30'24.6"N 0°08'34.4"W) that led to Green Park in Piccadilly, London. The post included a photo of an advertisement at these coordinates with unknown bright neon purple characters set to a blue background. The characters were quickly decoded by fan sites and said "Coldplay Higher Power May Seven". Similar posts would follow, which all teased the lead single, "Higher Power".

On 29 April, Coldplay confirmed on their main social media accounts that a new single called "Higher Power" would in fact be released on 7 May. Branded as a form of "extraterrestrial transmission", the band previewed the video to French European Space Agency astronaut Thomas Pesquet aboard the International Space Station prior to its public release. Martin had stated that the theme for their upcoming music had been inspired by "wonder[ing] what musicians are like across the universe" after watching the fictional Mos Eisley cantina band perform in Star Wars.

After the promotion cycle of "Higher Power" was done, Harvey teased a possible announcement on 19 July 2021. During the next day, Coldplay revealed the album, its tracklist, and a trailer titled "Overtura" containing a snippet for each song. They also said that "Coloratura" would be released on 23 July, while the next official single would follow in September. On 13 September, Coldplay announced that their second single "My Universe" which features BTS, would be released on 24 September 2021. On 4 October 2021, Selena Gomez confirmed via Twitter that she is featured on "Let Somebody Go".

On 1 October 2021, Coldplay announced a one-off album launch show at the O2 Shepherd's Bush Empire, London, in which they were introduced by Simon Pegg and joined on stage by Ed Sheeran, Fleur East and We Are King. Dakota Johnson was in attendance. Later that week, on 7 October 2021, Coldplay announced that an album pop-up event for Music of the Spheres, entitled "The Atmospheres", would be held in four cities across the world (Berlin, London, New York and Tokyo) on 15 and 16 October. In each city, there was a "custom-built installation" that enabled fans to "be transported to The Spheres – the distant solar system that plays host to the band's latest album, where each of the twelve tracks is twinned with a different planet." During the event, fans had the opportunity to "create their own alien language messages, snap selfies in the augmented reality photo booth, and even help to power the experience through bespoke kinetic walkways." According to the band, the event was made possible by partnering with Amazon Music.

=== World tour ===
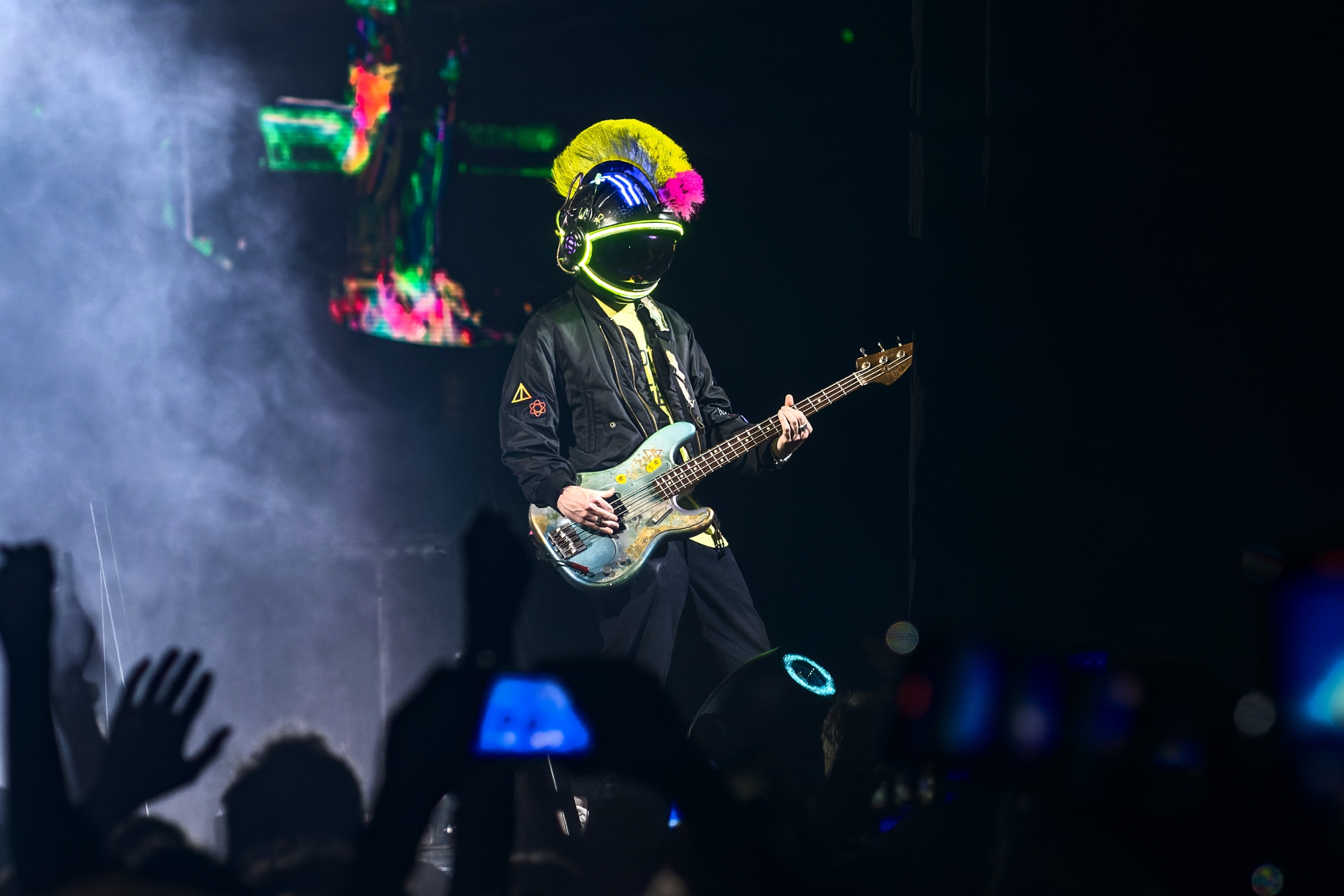
Berryman performing "Infinity Sign" at Wembley Stadium, London

On 14 October 2021, a day before the release of Music of the Spheres, Coldplay officially announced the Music of the Spheres World Tour in 2022 to promote the album. The band had not toured for Everyday Life as they had decided to pause touring until they could work out how to ensure that it would be environmentally friendly. Alongside the announcement, they released a detailed plan setting out how they would ensure that the tour would have a minimal impact on the environment and would result in 50% less carbon dioxide generated than during the A Head Full of Dreams Tour. The plan was developed over two years by Coldplay and a number of leading environmental experts, and features a number of innovative sustainability strategies. For example, the band have joined forces with BMW to create the first "mobile, rechargeable show battery" to power each concert on the tour, and have announced that the tour's stage will be built from "a combination of lightweight, low-carbon and re-usable materials (including bamboo and recycled steel) that can be properly reused or recycled at the end of the tour". They have also pledged to plant one tree for every ticket sold.

=== Commercial singles ===
"Higher Power" was released as the lead single on 7 May 2021. The song was produced by Max Martin, whom the band called "a true wonder of the universe". The band stated in a tweet that "it arrived on a little keyboard and a bathroom sink at the start of 2020". An audio visualiser directed by Paul Dugdale premiered on Coldplay's YouTube channel at 12:01 a.m. BST on the same day. The official music video, directed by Dave Meyers, was released on 8 June 2021, it features Chris exploring the fictional planet Kaotica.

"My Universe", a collaboration with South Korean pop group BTS, was released as the second single on 24 September 2021. The official music video, also directed by Meyers, was released on 30 September 2021. It features both groups performing the song alongside a fictional band named "Supernova 7" in different futuristic planets, set during an era where music is banned around the universe. The track debuted at number one in Billboard Hot 100, which made Coldplay the first British group in history to achieve the feat. It was their second United States chart-topper and BTS' sixth.

"Let Somebody Go", a collaboration with Selena Gomez, was released as the third single in the adult contemporary radio on 14 February 2022. A music video was released a week prior, on 7 February 2022, once again being directed by Meyers.

=== Promotional singles ===
"Coloratura" was released on 23 July 2021 in anticipation for the album. It is the longest song ever released by the band, running at 10 minutes and 18 seconds.

"People of the Pride" impacted American alternative rock radio stations on 8 March 2022, although Chris stated during an interview the song would not be marketed as an official single. Its lyrics explore themes of human politics and is inspired by empowerment movements. A music video was directed by Paul Dugdale and released on 15 March 2022.

A live version of "Humankind" was released as a charity single on 22 April 2022 through Bandcamp for Earth Day 2022, with royalties being donated to EarthPercent, a charity supporting numerous organizations working to help tackle the climate crisis. The music video was directed by Stevie Rae Gibbs and Marcus Haney, being released on 17 August 2022 to further promote the Music of the Spheres World Tour. On 16 September 2022, the song was then released as a promotional single in Italian and Dutch radio stations serving the same purpose.

"Biutyful" was made available as a promotional single on 6 July 2022 along with a video directed by Mat Whitecross.

== Critical reception ==
=== Reviews ===
Professional ratings
Aggregate scores
Source	Rating
AnyDecentMusic?	5.0/10
Metacritic	55/100
Review scores
Source	Rating
AllMusic	4/5 stars
Clash	5/10
The Daily Telegraph	3/5 stars
Financial Times	2/5 stars
The Guardian	2/5 stars
The Independent	3/5 stars
NME	4/5 stars
Pitchfork	5.1/10
Rolling Stone	3/5 stars
The Times	2/5 stars

Music of the Spheres received generally mixed reviews from music critics. At Metacritic, which assigns a normalised rating out of 100 to reviews from mainstream critics, the album has an average score of 55 based on 18 reviews, which indicates "mixed or average reviews". Ludovic Hunter-Tilney of the Financial Times gave the album two stars out of five, praising its cheerful lyrics but criticising its superficial feeling. This sentiment was echoed by Neil McCormick of The Daily Telegraph, which called the album a "giddy sugar rush" and gave it three stars out of five. Alexis Petridis of The Guardian also gave the album two stars out of five, calling its pop tones a "desperate" attempt by the band to stay on top of the record charts. Rhian Daly of NME gave the album four stars out of five and declared that "While Music of the Spheres feels like quintessential Coldplay, there are some more surprising moments buried in its tracklist", citing the songs "People of the Pride" and "Infinity Sign" as examples.

Neil Z. Yeung from AllMusic also gave the album four stars out of five, deeming it the band's "most unabashedly pop-centric and optimistic album to date. He elaborated that "This sci-fi concept piece is the spiritual successor to technicolor predecessors Mylo Xyloto and A Head Full of Dreams – outpacing both with its sharp focus and lean runtime – while maintaining the boundary-pushing energy heard on the Kaleidoscope EP and Everyday Life".

Conversely, the track "Coloratura" was universally praised. AllMusic's Neil Z. Yeung stated "while they typically end their albums on a grand, uplifting note, ["Coloratura"] takes the prize for ambition and sheer beauty". Ella Kemp, writing for Rolling Stone UK, said the song "might be the most dazzling thing Coldplay have ever done, a sprawling Pink Floyd-esque experiment which pays off infinitely". Will Hodgkinson of The Times called it as a "forward-thinking vision of a melodic utopia with shades of Pink Floyd at their most hopeful". Jeremy Levine of PopMatters praised the track "plenty of structural risks that allow it to achieve a surprising level of intimacy. It's still a little lyrically over-the-top, but the variations in tone, as well as the climactic use of the band's retro instrumentation, leave us with at least one flicker of Coldplay's brilliance". Ludovic Hunter-Tilney of the Financial Times felt the album's concept "only really registers" on "Coloratura", praising the elaborate orchestrations and "more sophisticated lyrics than the gaucheries of the previous songs". Paolo Ragusa of Consequence agreed, saying the song "really flesh out what the record is supposed to sound like: sprawling, odd, and unique". Bobby Olivier of Spin, however, felt it was "overlong", while David Cobbald of The Line of Best Fit said it "lacks a sense of originality, as all of emotions and lyrics have in way appeared in their music previously".

=== Rankings ===
List of critic rankings
Publication	Description	Result	Ref.
AllMusic	Year in Review – Favorite Pop Albums 2021	Placed	
The Courier	Top 5 Favorite Albums of 2021	5	
Esquire Spain	The Best Albums of 2021	41	
Europe 2	The 10 Best Albums of 2021	Placed	
G1	Most Important Albums of 2021	Placed	
Los 40	The 40 Best Albums of 2021	5	
Uproxx	The Best Pop Albums of 2021	Placed	
Yahoo!	Jen Kucsak's Best Albums of 2021	4	

== Accolades ==
List of awards and nominations
Year	Ceremony	Category	Result	Ref.
2022	American Music Awards	Favorite Rock Album	Nominated	
2022	Billboard Music Awards	Top Rock Album	Nominated	
2022	Hungarian Music Awards	Foreign Alternative/Indie Rock Album of the Year	Nominated	
2022	Žebřík Music Awards	Best Foreign Album	Nominated	
2023	Grammy Awards	Album of the Year	Nominated	
2023	Grammy Awards	Best Pop Vocal Album	Nominated	

== Commercial performance ==
Music of the Spheres debuted atop the UK Albums Chart with 101,045 units sold, becoming Coldplay's ninth number-one and the first release of the 2020s to move over 100,000 units in a week across the country. It also reached number four on the US Billboard 200 by shifting 57,000 units, making it their eighth Top 10 album. In France, the band topped the chart for a sixth time, with 15,908 units. In Japan, the album debuted at number 15 with 5,926 physical copies sold. Four songs appeared on South Korea's Gaon Download Chart simultaneously, including non-single "People of the Pride". According to Music Week, the record was among the United Kingdom's main contributors to the increase of CD sales in 2021. It became the fifth best-selling album of the year in cassette and the 15th best-selling on vinyl as well.

== Track listing ==
Music of the Spheres – standard edition track listing
No.	Title	Writer(s)	Producer(s)	Length
1.	"Music of the Spheres"	Coldplay; Max Martin; Rik Simpson; Dan Green; Federico Vindver; Bill Rahko	Martin; Oscar Holter; Rahko; Simpson; Green; Vindver	0:53
2.	"Higher Power"	Coldplay; Martin; Vindver; Denise Carite	Martin; Holter; Rahko; Simpson; Green	3:26
3.	"Humankind"	Coldplay; Martin; Vindver; Green; Jon Hopkins; Holter; Stephen Fry	Martin; Holter; Rahko; Green; Vindver; Hopkins	4:26
4.	"Alien Choir"	Coldplay; Martin; Hopkins	Martin; Rahko; Hopkins	0:53
5.	"Let Somebody Go" (with Selena Gomez)	Coldplay; Martin; Apple Martin; Olivia Waithe; Holter; Rahko; Leland Wayne	Martin; Holter; Rahko; Simpson; Green; Hopkins; Metro Boomin	4:01
6.	"Human Heart" (with We Are King and Jacob Collier)	Coldplay; Martin; Collier; Paris Strother; Amber Strother	Martin; Holter; Rahko; Collier; We Are King	3:08
7.	"People of the Pride"	Coldplay; Martin; Rahko; Derek Dixie; Samuel Falson; Jesse Rogg	Martin; Holter; Rahko; Simpson; Green	3:37
8.	"Biutyful"	Coldplay; Martin; Holter; Davide Rossi	Martin; Holter; Rahko; Simpson; Green; Angel Lopez; Vindver	3:12
9.	"Music of the Spheres II"	Coldplay; Martin	Martin; Rahko	0:21
10.	"My Universe" (with BTS)	Coldplay; Martin; Holter; Rahko; Suga; J-Hope; RM	Martin; Holter; Rahko; Simpson; Green	3:46
11.	"Infinity Sign"	Coldplay; Martin; Hopkins	Martin; Holter; Rahko; Simpson; Green; Hopkins	3:46
12.	"Coloratura"	Coldplay; Martin; P. Strother; John Metcalfe; Rossi	Martin; Holter; Rahko	10:17
Total length:				41:50

Music of the Spheres – Japanese edition bonus tracks
No.	Title	Writer(s)	Producer(s)	Length
13.	"Higher Power" (acoustic version)	Coldplay; Martin; Vindver; Carite	Martin; Holter; Rahko; Simpson; Green	3:34
14.	"Higher Power" (Tiësto remix)	Coldplay; Martin; Vindver; Carite	Martin; Holter; Rahko; Simpson; Green; Tiësto	3:49
Total length:				49:13

Music of the Spheres – digital deluxe edition bonus tracks
No.	Title	Writer(s)	Producer(s)	Length
13.	"Higher Power" (acoustic version)	Coldplay; Martin; Vindver; Carite	Martin; Holter; Rahko; Simpson; Green	3:34
14.	"My Universe" (acoustic version)	Coldplay; Martin; Holter; Rahko; Suga; J-Hope; RM	Martin; Holter; Rahko; Simpson; Green	3:43
15.	"My Universe" (Supernova 7 mix)	Coldplay; Martin; Holter; Rahko; Suga; J-Hope; RM	Martin; Holter; Rahko; Simpson; Green	4:39
16.	"My Universe" (Suga's remix)	Coldplay; Martin; Holter; Rahko; Suga; J-Hope; RM	Martin; Holter; Rahko; Simpson; Green	3:08
17.	"My Universe" (orchestral mix)	Coldplay; Martin; Holter; Rahko; Suga; J-Hope; RM	Martin; Holter; Rahko; Simpson; Green	4:19
Total length:				61:13

Notes

- "Music of the Spheres" is stylised as "" and occasionally rendered as "Music of the Spheres I".
- "Alien Choir" is stylised as "".
- "Human Heart" is stylised as "".
- "Music of the Spheres II" is stylised as "".
- "Infinity Sign" is stylised as "".

Sample credits

- "People of the Pride" contains a sample of "Black and Gold" (written by Sam Sparro and Jesse Rogg).

== Personnel ==
Coldplay

- Chris Martin – lead vocals, guitars, piano, keyboards, rhythm guitar (track 7)
- Jonny Buckland – guitars, keyboards, backing vocals (track 11), percussion (track 7)
- Guy Berryman – bass guitar, percussion (track 7), keyboards
- Will Champion – drums, percussion, keyboards, backing vocals, programming (track 7)
- Phil Harvey

Additional vocalists

- Max Martin – backing vocals (track 2, 10, 12)
- Denise Carite – choir vocalist (track 2)
- Bill Rahko – additional vocals (track 2, 10)
- Apple Martin – additional vocals (track 2)
- Stevie Mackey – choir vocalist (track 2)
- Dorian Holley – choir vocalist (track 2)
- Neka Hamilton – choir vocalist (track 2)
- Selena Gomez – vocals (track 5)
- We Are King – vocals (track 6)
- Jin – vocals (track 10)
- Suga – vocals (track 10)
- J-Hope – vocals (track 10)
- RM – vocals (track 10)
- Jimin – vocals (track 10)
- V – vocals (track 10)
- Jungkook – vocals (track 10)
- Amber Strother – additional vocals (track 10)
- Jacob Collier – additional vocals (track 6, 10)
- Tate McDowell – additional vocals (track 10)
- Rik Simpson – additional vocals (track 12)

Additional musicians

- Max Martin – keyboards, additional keyboards (track 2, 10, 12)
- Federico Vindver – keyboards (track 2)
- Oscar Holter – guitar, keyboards (track 2, 10, 12)
- Bill Rahko – keyboards, theremin (track 10, 12)
- Dan Green – keyboards (track 10)
- Davide Rossi – strings (track 12)
- John Metcalfe – strings (track 12)
- Jon Hopkins – keyboards (track 12)
- Paris Strother – synthesizer (track 12)
- Rik Simpson – additional keyboards (track 12)

Production

- Max Martin – production and programming
- Oscar Holter – production and programming
- Bill Rahko – production and programming
- Pdogg – vocal recording engineering, production engineering
- Rik Simpson – additional production
- Dan Green – additional production and programming
- Serban Ghenea – mixing engineer
- Randy Merrill – mastering engineer
- John Hanes – engineering
- Michael Ilbert – engineering
- Connor Panayi – assistant engineering
- Duncan Fuller – assistant engineering
- Karl-Ola Kjellholm – assistant engineering
- Linn Fijal – assistant engineering
- Tate McDowell – assistant engineering
- Love Choir – choir arrangement
- The Dream Team – additional production
- Miguel Lara – engineering
- Emma Marks – engineering assistant
- Duncan Fuller – engineering assistant
- Cherif Hashizume – additional programmer

Artwork and design

- Pilar Zeta – design and art direction

== Charts ==
=== Weekly charts ===
Weekly chart performance
Chart (2021)	Peak position
Argentine Albums (CAPIF)	2
Australian Albums (ARIA)	1
Austrian Albums (Ö3 Austria)	2
Belgian Albums (Ultratop Flanders)	1
Belgian Albums (Ultratop Wallonia)	1
Canadian Albums (Billboard)	2
Croatian International Albums (HDU)	1
Czech Albums (ČNS IFPI)	1
Danish Albums (Hitlisten)	6
Dutch Albums (Album Top 100)	1
Finnish Albums (Suomen virallinen lista)	4
French Albums (SNEP)	1
German Albums (Offizielle Top 100)	2
Greek Albums (IFPI Greece)	8
Hong Kong Albums (HKRMA)	3
Hungarian Albums (MAHASZ)	4
Icelandic Albums (Tónlistinn)	24
Irish Albums (Official Charts)	1
Italian Albums (FIMI)	4
Japanese Albums (Oricon)	13
Japanese Combined Albums (Oricon)	13
Japanese Hot Albums (Billboard Japan)	10
Lithuanian Albums (AGATA)	8
New Zealand Albums (RMNZ)	2
Norwegian Albums (VG-lista)	2
Polish Albums (ZPAV)	5
Portuguese Albums (AFP)	1
Scottish Albums (Official Charts)	1
Slovak Albums (ČNS IFPI)	1
South Korean Retail Albums (Gaon)	34
Spanish Albums (Promusicae)	1
Swedish Albums (Sverigetopplistan)	3
Swiss Albums (Schweizer Hitparade)	2
Taiwanese Albums (Five Music)	1
UK Albums (Official Charts)	1
US Billboard 200	4
US Top Rock & Alternative Albums (Billboard)	1

=== Monthly charts ===
Monthly chart performance
Chart (2021)	Peak position
Czech Albums (ČNS IFPI)	11
Japanese Albums (Oricon)	33
Slovak Albums (ČNS IFPI)	4

=== Year-end charts ===
Year-end chart performance
Chart (2021)	Position
Austrian Albums (Ö3 Austria)	53
Belgian Albums (Ultratop Flanders)	31
Belgian Albums (Ultratop Wallonia)	17
Dutch Albums (Album Top 100)	41
French Albums (SNEP)	40
German Albums (Offizielle Top 100)	42
Hungarian Albums (MAHASZ)	42
Italian Albums (FIMI)	98
Portuguese Albums (AFP)	15
Spanish Albums (Promusicae)	62
Swedish Physical Albums (Sverigetopplistan)	42
Swiss Albums (Schweizer Hitparade)	19
UK Albums (OCC)	14
US Top Alternative Albums (Billboard)	34
US Top Rock Albums (Billboard)	60
Worldwide Album Sales (IFPI)	16

Chart (2022)	Position
Belgian Albums (Ultratop Flanders)	30
Belgian Albums (Ultratop Wallonia)	42
Dutch Albums (Album Top 100)	26
French Albums (SNEP)	96
Hungarian Albums (MAHASZ)	99
Portuguese Albums (AFP)	32
Spanish Albums (Promusicae)	54
US Top Alternative Albums (Billboard)	34

Chart (2023)	Position
Belgian Albums (Ultratop Flanders)	182
Spanish Vinyl Albums (Promusicae)	54

== Certifications and sales ==
Certifications and sales
Region	Certification	Certified units/sales
Brazil (Pro-Música Brasil)	Platinum	40,000^{‡}
Canada (Music Canada)	Gold	40,000^{‡}
Denmark (IFPI Danmark)	Gold	10,000^{‡}
France (SNEP)	Platinum	150,000 (Note: French total sales for Music of the Spheres as of December 2024.)
Italy (FIMI)	Platinum	50,000^{‡}
Japan	—	13,788 (Note: Japanese physical sales for Music of the Spheres as of November 2023.)
Mexico (AMPROFON)	Gold	70,000^{‡}
New Zealand (RMNZ)	Platinum	15,000^{‡}
Poland (ZPAV)	Gold	10,000^{‡}
Spain (Promusicae)	Gold	20,000^{‡}
United Kingdom (BPI)	Gold	204,623 (Note: British total sales for Music of the Spheres as of August 2022.)
United States	—	395,000 (Note: American total sales for Music of the Spheres as of January 2023.)
^{‡} Sales+streaming figures based on certification alone.

== Release history ==
Release history and formats
Region	Date	Format	Label	Ref.
Various	15 October 2021	CD · LP · cassette · digital download · streaming	Parlophone · Atlantic · Warner Music	

== See also ==
- 2021 in British music
- List of number-one albums of 2021 (Australia)
- List of number-one albums of 2021 (Belgium)
- List of number-one albums of 2021 (Ireland)
- List of number-one albums of 2021 (Portugal)
- List of number-one albums of 2021 (Spain)
- List of number-one hits of 2021 (France)
- List of number-one albums of the 2020s (Czech Republic)
- List of UK Albums Chart number ones of the 2020s
