= Bloom (Durand Bernarr album) =

Studio album by Durand Bernarr
- Released: February 18, 2025
- Genre: R&B; funk
- Label: DSing

Durand Bernarr chronology
Wanderlust (2022)	Bloom (2025)	Bernarr (2026)

Singles from Bloom
- 1. "Impact" Released: January 28, 2025

Bloom is an album by American singer Durand Bernarr, released on February 18, 2025.

Bloom is a funky-R&B album with influences from several genres. The album received positive reviews, earning three 2026 Grammy Award nominations and winning for Best Progressive R&B Album, Bernarr's first honor at the ceremony.

Bernarr embarked on a US and European tour, titled the You Gon Grow, Too Tour, in 2025 to promote Bloom.

== Background ==
In 2024, Bernarr released the EP En Route which garnered his first Grammy nomination for Best Progressive R&B Album in 2025. He has described the 1995 Waiting to Exhale film soundtrack as a reference point for Bloom.

== Composition ==
On the album's title, Bernarr said: "Dr. [T. Anansi] Wilson came up with the title before he even heard the music. We were talking about growth and being in environments that help evolve and enhance who we are. He sent me a whole rundown of what “bloom” means, and it clicked."

Bloom is primarily about Bernarr's appreciation for his "platonic friendships." Meagan Jordan of Rolling Stone stated in a positive review: "Bloom pulls on Bernarr's musical knowledge and appreciation of many genres, while still remaining unique and authentic to his own vocal style." Rated R&B noted the album's sound as containing "virtuosic vocals, Stax-style horns and deep-pocket drum grooves" with "the soul, house and funk stylings [Bernarr] has dabbled with throughout his career."

The opening track, "Generous," is a "slick and punchy groove." Track two, "Flounce," is a "floor-quaking" interpretation of 1990s house. Track three, "Impact," was likened to electronic-funk. The "standout" track eight, "Completed," has touches of rock. Track 13, "That!," features T-Pain and resembles 2000s R&B. Vibe described the album as "funk-infused."

Bernarr added:

“This album is about growth—discovering love beyond romance, cultivating self-acceptance, and thriving in the spaces that allow us to bloom. Traces of Phyllis Hyman, Luther Vandross, Maxwell, Chanté Moore, and Missy Elliott are woven into the fabric of the album. It’s laughter, it’s anxiety, it’s frustration, it’s triumph—it’s all the things that make us human. And at the heart of it, BLOOM is an invitation to embrace every part of the journey.”

== Promotion ==
"Impact" was released as the lead single for the album on January 28, 2025. "Overqualified" received a music video release. Bernarr embarked on a tour in 2025 to promote Bloom, titled the You Gon Grow, Too Tour, visiting the United States and Europe.

== Reception ==
Bernarr was the second-most nominated R&B act at the 2026 Grammy Awards, gaining three nominations for Bloom, including Best Progressive R&B Album, which he ultimately won; Best R&B Song for "Overqualified"; and Best Traditional R&B Performance for "Here We Are". Following his Grammy win, streams of Bloom tracks surged on Spotify: "Generous" increased 1,195%; "Flounce" increased 910%; and "Overqualified" increased 570%, respectively.

Year-end rankings of Bloom
Publication	List	Rank	Ref.
Rated R&B	The 25 Best R&B Albums of 2025	1	
Billboard	20 Best R&B Albums of 2025: Staff Picks	7	

== Track listing ==
No.	Title	Length
1.	"Generous"	6:09
2.	"Flounce" (featuring Gawd)	4:39
3.	"Impact"	4:59
4.	"Jump"	4:23
5.	"No Business" (featuring E-Whizz)	5:17
6.	"Overqualified"	5:18
7.	"Unspoken"	3:26
8.	"Completed"	5:47
9.	"Reaching"	4:30
10.	"Psst!"	4:27
11.	"Here We Are"	4:35
12.	"Blast!"	5:23
13.	"That!" (featuring T-Pain)	4:19
14.	"Specialty"	6:14
15.	"Home Alone"	7:02
