= Mali Music (singer) =

- Also known as: Jamaal Pollard
- Born: Kortney Jamaal Pollard; January 12, 1988 (age 38); Phoenix, Arizona, U.S.
- Origin: Savannah, Georgia, U.S.
- Genres: Gospel, R&B, hip hop
- Occupations: Singer-songwriter, record producer
- Instruments: Vocals, piano, guitar
- Years active: 2007–present
- Labels: Provident; RCA; Bystorm; KonLive
- Website: www.malimusicofficial.com

Kortney Jamaal Pollard (born January 12, 1988), known professionally as Mali Music, is an American singer-songwriter and record producer from Savannah, Georgia. His first two studio albums, The Coming (2008) and The 2econd Coming (2009) were released independently through ByStorm Records and met with critical acclaim. In 2011, he was the first inspirational artist to be part of BET's "Music Matters" series. He signed with RCA Records to release his first major-label single "Beautiful" the following year, which preceded his third album and major label debut, Mali Is... (2014). The album received a Grammy Award nomination for Best Urban Contemporary Album.

== Career ==
Pollard was born in Phoenix, Arizona. He learned to play the piano at age 5 and at age 11 was active in the ministry of music in his church. In 2011, he signed a short-lived contract with Akon's label KonLive Distribution.

The 2econd Coming was released on October 20, 2009, Ready Aim & Beautiful on February 26, 2013 and Mali Is... on June 17, 2014.

== Discography ==
=== Studio albums ===
List of studio albums, with selected details and peak chart position
Title	Album details	Peak chart position		
Title	Album details	US	US R&B/HH	US R&B
The Coming	Released: February 14, 2008; Label: Bystorm; Format: CD, digital download	—	—	—
The 2econd Coming	Released: October 20, 2009; Label: Bystorm; Format: CD, digital download	—	—	—
Mali Is...	Released: June 18, 2014; Label: Bystorm, RCA; Format: CD, digital download	16	—	2
The Transition of Mali	Released: June 2, 2017; Label: Bystorm, RCA; Format: CD, digital download	117	49	14
The Book of Mali	Released: August 14, 2020; Label: K Approved, Provident; Format: CD, digital download	—	—	—

== Awards and nominations ==
Year	Awards	Category	Nominated work	Result
2013	GMA Dove Awards	Rap/Hip Hop Recorded Song of the Year	"Tell the World" (with Lecrae)	Won
2015	Grammy Awards	Best Urban Contemporary Album	Mali Is...	Nominated
2015	Grammy Awards	Best Gospel Performance/Song	"I Believe"	Nominated
2015	BET Awards	Best Gospel Artist	Himself	Nominated
2018	NAACP Image Awards	Outstanding Song, Contemporary	"Gonna Be Alright"	Nominated
2018	Grammy Awards	Best Traditional R&B Performance	"Still"	Nominated
2021	Grammy Awards	Best Gospel Performance/Song	"Movin' On"(with Jonathan McReynolds)	Won
