= Durand Bernarr =

American singer-songwriter, producer and DJ

- Also known as: alcoholharmony, DJ TBD aka Bra Coley
- Born: Bernarr Durand Ferebee Jr. September 16, 1988 (age 38); Cleveland, Ohio, U.S.
- Genres: R&B; soul; hip hop; gospel; jazz
- Occupations: Singer-songwriter, producer, DJ, Comedian
- Instruments: Vocals, piano, keyboard
- Years active: 2005–present
- Label: DSING Records (Independent)
- Website: durandbernarr.com

Bernarr Durand Ferebee Jr. (born September 16, 1988), known professionally as Durand Bernarr, is an American singer-songwriter, producer, and DJ. He frequently provides background vocals for neo-soul artist Erykah Badu and featured vocals for other artists such as Anderson .Paak, Kaytranada, and the Internet. In 2019, Bernarr was a runner-up on the BET reality music competition The Next Big Thing. In 2026, he earned his first Grammy Award for Best Progressive R&B Album for his album BLOOM.

== Early life ==
Bernarr was born and raised in Cleveland, Ohio. He was raised an only child by his mother, a professional music teacher and vocal coach, and his father, an audio engineer who worked with artists like Jay-Z, Beyonce, Rihanna, Jill Scott, and Whitney Houston. At 16, Bernarr accompanied his father on tour for Earth, Wind & Fire as a production assistant. He attended church where his mother was the music director and his interest in music was further nurtured by the gospel music he heard there. He cites Erykah Badu, Rick James and Little Richard as his biggest influences.

== Career ==
In 2008, Bernarr began to grow his digital fanbase by posting YouTube videos that incorporated singing, dancing, and comedic commentary. He also covered popular songs by artists like Kanye West, Amy Winehouse, and Gnarls Barkley. In 2009, he released his first mixtape titled alcoholharmony: The MixT@pe consisting of studio versions of his popular covers from YouTube and original content via Bandcamp. In 2010, Bernarr released his second EP 8ight: The Stepson of Erykah Badu, a compilation of Badu covers and medleys. Shortly after, Badu messaged him on Twitter and, having heard 8ight, she hired him as a background vocalist in her band Nedda Stella in 2011.

Bernarr collaborates with various mainstream and independent artists as a featured vocalist or providing background vocals. He has collaborated and performed with Ari Lennox, Kaytranada, The Foreign Exchange, The Internet, Sam Sparro, Thundercat, Knxwledge, Qveen Herby, Tweet and Teedra Moses.

Bernarr competed on BET's 2019 reality music competition series The Next Big Thing. He both rapped and sang, and eventually finished as one of the top three performers.

He released the album DUR& (pronounced Durand) in September 2020. In a review, Lucas Aubry of Numéro stated that the album "once again shows his incredible ability to go up in the highs like D’Angelo and down into the low and groovy frequencies of Nate Dogg in numerous rapped moments." In 2022 he released the EP Wanderlust. On the accompanying tour he began DJing under the moniker DJ TBD aka Bra Coley.

Bernarr released the album En Route in 2024. En Route earned a nomination for a Grammy Award for Best Progressive R&B Album, his first nomination. He released the album BLOOM in 2025, which is primarily about his appreciation for his "platonic friendships." Meagan Jordan of Rolling Stone stated in a positive review: "Bloom pulls on Bernarr’s musical knowledge and appreciation of many genres, while still remaining unique and authentic to his own vocal style." BLOOM received three Grammy Award nominations, and won the award for Best Progressive R&B Album, which was his first win. His acceptance speech was referred to as "radiating joy."

He released the album Bernarr on May 1, 2026. The album is named for his father, Bernarr Ferebee Sr. The album features Raphael Saadiq, Big Sean, Sevyn Streeter, Khalid, James Fauntleroy, and Vic Mensa. Kyle Denis of Billboard stated in a positive review that Bernarr "expands the singer’s soulful, gospel-informed soundscape with splashy flourishes of yacht rock, P-Funk, house and Miami bass."

== Personal life ==
Bernarr resides in Los Angeles. He identifies as queer.

== Discography ==
=== Studio albums ===
- #Blameitonthemango (2014)
- DUR& (2020)
- Wanderlust (2022)
- BLOOM (2025)
- BERNARR. (2026)

=== EPs ===
- EXTRA Stankin' Christmas (2012)
- ANXIETY (2013)
- Sound Check (2016)
- En Route (2024)
- Charlie Vettuno Presents... Where in the World is Carmen Randiego?! (with Charlie Vettuno) (2024)

=== Mixtapes ===
- alcoholharmony: The MixT@pe (2009)
- 8ight: The Stepson of Erykah Badu (2010)
- Some Time in December, 1987 (2011)
- 80's Baby (2012)

=== Guest appearances ===
Title	Year	Lead artist(s)	Album	Ref
"Hang on 2 Your Love"	2013	Sam Sparro	Quantum Physical, Vol. 1 EP	
"Talk Like God"	2013	Mr. Ivory Snow	Rugged	
"Moon Springs, Natural" (also featuring Rome Fortune)	2014	Lorenzo Asher	Numismatics	
"Fade"	2018	Mr. Ivory Snow	Snow	
"One More Time"	2018	Uptowne Buddha	Bravo	
"Freefall"	2019	Kaytranada	Bubba	
"Houzkatz"	2019	Adam Ness	Sagittarius	
"Shut up & Groove"	2019	Romero Mosley	Forever Is for Dreamers	
"Self Aware"	2020	Qveen Herby	EP 8	
"Facetime (Remix)"	2020	Ari Lennox	Shea Butter Baby (Remix EP)	
"Dance to My Heart"	2020	Mr. Ivory Snow	Unreleased II (Light)	
"Can't Wait to Go Outside"	2020	Nanna.B	QuaranTina	
"minding_my business"(also featuring Rose Gold)	2020	Knxwledge	1988	
"I Like It"	2021	Terrell Grice	The Terrell One Million Show	
"Sugar Coat Me"	2021	Philip Lassiter	Live in Love	
"Root Chakra" (also featuring Munir Hossn and Jeff Coffin)	2021	Philip Lassiter	Live in Love	
"Whisper (Want You)" (also featuring Allen Love and Steve Lacy)	2021	Patrick Paige II	If I Fail Are We Still Cool?	
"Move On"	2022	Khé	I'll Be OKhé	
"Perspective" (also featuring Aron Hodek and Philip Lassiter)	2022	Candy Dulfer	We Never Stop	
"Midnight"	2022	Kendre Streeter	Facets of Love	
"That Bag"	2022	Elijah Boothe	Wake Up Call	
"Wonderland"	2022	Metta	Euphoric Misery	
"Stuck"	2022	Jam in The Van & T.Nava	T.Nava - Jam in teh Van (Live Session, Los Angeles, CA 2022)	
"Girlfriend"	2022	Jam in The Van & T.Nava	T.Nava - Jam in teh Van (Live Session, Los Angeles, CA 2022)	
"Red Aura" (also featuring Qveen Herby)	2023	Tech N9ne	Bliss	
"Own It All"	2023	Soul from the O	Queens and Pharaohs	
"Repent - Live" (also featuring Candy Dulfer)	2023	Philip Lassiter	Raw In Amsterdam (Live)	
"Make America Love Again - Live"	2023	Philip Lassiter	Raw In Amsterdam (Live)	
"Bump The Man - Live"	2023	Philip Lassiter	Raw In Amsterdam (Live)	
"Sugar Coat Me - Live"	2023	Philip Lassiter	Raw In Amsterdam (Live)	
"Wings Of Love - Live"	2023	Philip Lassiter	Raw In Amsterdam (Live)	
"Soul Music - Live"	2023	Philip Lassiter	Raw In Amsterdam (Live)	
"Weird"	2024	Kaytranada	Timeless	
"Tuesday Afternoon"	2024	Sara Lina	The Fool	
"Eat The Rich"	2024	VVitch King	VVitch King	
"Le Départ"	2024	Adi Oasis	Lotus Glow (Deluxe)	
"on the way"	2024	Solomon Fox	speedrun	
"Let It Drop"	2025	Estelle	Stay Alta	
"Last Lovers"	2025	Aria Lanelle	The Quiet Parts Out Loud	
"Lover" (also featuring Tiffany Gouché)	2025	André Mego	Scent of a Woman	
"Lover - Acapella" (also featuring Tiffany Gouché)	2026	André Mego	A Scent Deconstructed	
"Lover - Freeverse" (also featuring Tiffany Gouché)	2026	André Mego	A Scent Deconstructed	
"Falling"	2026	E-WHIZZ	Whizz's Archive Vol 3	
"Bossa Bossa"	2026	E-WHIZZ	Whizz's Archive Vol 3	
"How Can I"	2026	E-WHIZZ	Whizz's Archive Vol 3	
"Moonlight"	2026	Miranda Rae	Soul Food	

== Awards and nominations ==
=== Grammy Awards ===
The Grammy Awards are awarded annually by the National Academy of Recording Arts and Sciences. Bernarr has earned 1 award from 6 nominations.

Year	Award	Nominated work	Result
2025	Best Progressive R&B Album	En Route	Nominated
2026	Best Progressive R&B Album	Bloom	Won
2026	Best R&B Song	"Overqualified"	Nominated
2026	Best Traditional R&B Performance	"Here We Are"	Nominated
2027	Best Progressive R&B Album	Bernarr	Pending
2027	Best Traditional R&B Performance	"I Found Myself"	Pending

=== Miscellaneous awards ===
Year	Organization	Award	Nominated work	Result	Ref.
2025	GLAAD Media Awards	Outstanding Breakthrough Music Artist	Himself	Won	
2026	GLAAD Media Awards	Outstanding Music Artist	Bloom	Nominated	
2026	Queerty Awards	Anthem	"Overqualified"	Nominated	
2026	BET Awards	Best Male R&B/Pop Artist	Himself	Nominated	
2026	Native Son Awards	Honoree	Himself	Honored	
