= Ratpi World =

2021 song by Booba

Single by Booba
- Released: 2021
- Recorded: 2020
- Genre: French hip hop
- Length: 2:20
- Label: Universal
- Songwriter: Booba
- Producer: Booba

Booba singles chronology
"5G" (2020)	"Ratpi World" (2021)	"Mona Lisa" (2021)

Music video
- "Ratpi World" on YouTube

"Ratpi World" is a song by French artist Booba released in 2021. The song peaked atop on the French Singles Chart.

== Charts ==
Chart performance for "Ratpi World"
Chart (2021)	Peak position
Belgium (Ultratop 50 Wallonia)	27
France (SNEP)	1
Switzerland (Schweizer Hitparade)	34
