= Mali Is... =

Studio album by Mali Music
- Released: June 18, 2014
- Genre: Contemporary Christian music, Christian hip hop, R&B
- Length: 44:30
- Label: Bystorm, RCA
- Producer: Arden "Keyz" Altino, Oliver "Akos" Castelli, Akene Dunkley, Jerry "Wonda" Duplessis, Andre Harris, Stephen McGregor, Kortney Pollard

Mali Music chronology
The 2econd Coming (2009)	Mali Is... (2014)	The Transition Of Mali (2017)

Mali Is... is the third album by American recording artist Mali Music, released on June 18, 2014 by RCA Records and Bystorm Records. Mali Music worked with Arden "Keyz" Altino, Oliver "Akos" Castelli, Akene Dunkley, Jerry "Wonda" Duplessis, Andre Harris, Stephen McGregor, and Kortney Pollard on the production of this album. The album's lead single is "Beautiful".

== Reception ==
Professional ratings
Review scores
Source	Rating
AllMusic	4/5 stars
CCM Magazine	4/5 stars
New Release Tuesday	5/5 stars

Signaling in a four star out of five review for AllMusic, Andy Kellman replying, at times "Understated yet energized" where "all singles, all distinctive, and compelling." Andy Argyrakis, agrees it is a four star album for CCM Magazine, realizing, it "overflows with velvety vocals and smooth grooves" where it's "split between soulful pop, piano ballads, and the occasional nod to contemporary reggae." Adding a whole star to his rating compared to the aforementioned, New Release Tuesday's Dwayne Lacy commended this music "for the non-cliched songwriting, his amazing singing, and the message."

== Track listing ==
No.	Title	Writer(s)	Length
1.	"No Fun Alone"	Arden "Keyz" Altino, Oliver "Akos" Castelli, Akene Dunkley, Jerry "Wonda" Duplessis, Kortney Pollard	3:24
2.	"Ready Aim"	Arden "Keyz" Altino, Akene Dunkley, Jerry "Wonda" Duplessis, Kortney Pollard	3:42
3.	"Beautiful"	Arden "Keyz" Altino, Jerry "Wonda" Duplessis, Kortney Pollard	3:28
4.	"Heavy Love"	Dernst Emile, Kortney Pollard	3:20
5.	"Fight For You"	Dernst Emile, Kortney Pollard	4:05
6.	"Walking Shoes"	Andre Harris, Kortney Pollard	3:59
7.	"One"	Arden "Keyz" Altino, Akene Dunkley, Jerry "Wonda" Duplessis, Stephen McGregor, Kortney Pollard	3:40
8.	"Make It"	Jerry "Wonda" Duplessis, Kortney Pollard, Regina Spektor	3:26
9.	"Little Lady"	Lorenz Hart, Kortney Pollard, Richard Rodgers	3:25
10.	"Royalty"	Dernst Emile, Kortney Pollard	4:06
11.	"Johnny & Donna"	William J. Lee, Kortney Pollard	4:02
12.	"I Believe"	Kortney Pollard	3:53
Total length:			44:30

== Charts ==
=== Weekly charts ===
Chart (2014)	Peak position
US Billboard 200	16
US Top R&B/Hip-Hop Albums (Billboard)	2

=== Year-end charts ===
Chart (2014)	Position
US Top R&B/Hip-Hop Albums (Billboard)	57
