= La kiffance =

Single by Naps

from the album Les mains faites pour l'or
- Language: French
- Released: 26 February 2021
- Genre: French rap
- Length: 2:59

Music video
- "La kiffance" on YouTube

"La kiffance" (French pronunciation: [la kifɑ̃s]) is a song by French rapper Naps released in 2021. It spends 10 non-consecutive weeks at number one on the French Singles Chart.

== Charts ==
=== Weekly charts ===
Weekly chart performance for "La kiffance"
Chart (2021)	Peak position
Belgium (Ultratop 50 Wallonia)	5
France (SNEP)	1
Switzerland (Schweizer Hitparade)	18

=== Year-end charts ===
Year-end chart performance for "La kiffance"
Chart (2021)	Position
Belgium (Ultratop Wallonia)	9
France (SNEP)	1
Switzerland (Schweizer Hitparade)	54
