= Ani Couni Chaouani =

Native American song

"Ani Couni Chaouani" (Arapaho: Ani’qu ne’chawu’nani) is a traditional Native American hymn and song originating from the Arapaho tribes living on the plains of Colorado and Wyoming in the United States.

== Description ==
The hymn was formerly believed to have originated from the Iroquois Nation of the Northeast. However, a researcher associated with Radio-Canada discovered in 2017 that the hymn had originated from the centre of the United States, more specifically from the Arapaho tribes in Colorado and Wyoming.

The hymn is sung on a plaintive tone, with dancers to the hymn often crying and thinking about their condition of dependence.

== Lyrics ==
Original

Ani’qu ne’chawu’nani’,
Ani’qu ne’chawu’nani’;
Awa’wa biqāna’kaye’na,
Awa’wa biqāna’kaye’na;
Iyahu’h ni’bithi’ti,
Iyahu’h ni’bithi’ti.

Translation

Father, have mercy on me,
Father, have mercy on me;
Because I'm dying of thirst,
Because I'm dying of thirst;
Everything is gone – I have nothing to eat,
Everything is gone – I have nothing to eat.

== Music ==
According to the Fourteenth annual report of the Bureau of ethnology to the secretary of the Smithsonian institution (1896), the hymn is transcribed in suit with the following notes from the original tribal version in Arapaho:

== Covers and adaptations ==
Many artists have covered the song in various years, most notably Québec musician Madeleine Chartrand, who recorded a psychedelic rock version in 1973.

Natasha St-Pier covered it in her 2015 album Mon Acadie.

Ooata version

In 2011 the canadian singer Oota (lead singer Caroline Perron) published a cover version of Ani Kuni.

=== Polo & Pan version ===
"Ani Kuni"

Single by Polo & Pan

from the album Cyclorama
- Released: 7 May 2021
- Recorded: 2021
- Genre: House; electronica; world
- Label: Hamburger Records, Ekler'O'Shock, Virgin Records (France)
- Songwriter: Arapaho traditional tune

Polo & Pan singles chronology
"Feel Good" (2020)	"Ani Kuni" (2021)

Music video
- "Ani Kuni" on YouTube

In 2021, the French musical duo Polo & Pan made an adaptation of the song under the amended title "Ani Kuni" on their 2021 second album, Cyclorama.

Charts

Chart (2021)	Peak position
Belgium (Ultratop 50 Wallonia)	6
France (SNEP)	9

In 2022 the Brazilian and Canadian artist Batone released his version of this song in a single recorded live in the middle of nature and during a strong storm in the rural region of Piracaia, Sāo Paulo, Brazil.

== Bibliography ==
- Powel, J. W. (1896). Fourteenth annual report of the Bureau of ethnology to the secretary of the Smithsonian institution. Washington: Government printing office. p. 977.
