= We Are King (album) =

Studio album by King
- Released: February 5, 2016
- Studio: KING Creative Studios, Los Angeles
- Genre: R&B, dream pop
- Length: 57:30
- Label: King Creative
- Producer: Paris Strother

King chronology
The Story (2011)	We Are King (2016)

Singles from We Are King
- 1. "In the Meantime" Released: 2013; 2. "Mister Chameleon" Released: 2014; 3. "The Greatest" Released: 2015

We Are King is the debut album by R&B trio King (currently named We Are King), released on February 5, 2016. The album was nominated for Best Urban Contemporary Album at the 59th Grammy Awards, making them the first independent artists to be nominated in that category. Upon its release, We Are King appeared 6 times in the Billboard charts for 1st week sales: #1 on the Heatseekers Chart, #7 for Independent Albums, #8 for R&B, #20 for Top Hip-Hop/R&B, #78 for Top Album Sales, and #158 in the Top 200.

== Background ==
We Are King is the debut full-length album from King, following their 2011 release of The Story EP. The independently recorded and produced album contains 12 tracks, including extended mixes of the three songs from The Story EP; "The Story", "Supernatural", and "Hey". We Are King was recorded between 2011 and 2015 at King Creative, the Strother sisters' home studio in Los Angeles, California. The album was written by the three members, and features production and instrumentation by Paris Strother, with additional instrumentation by Kyle Bolden (guitar), Thomas Lea (strings), and The Regiment Horns (brass & woodwinds). The album was engineered and recorded by Paris Strother, with additional engineering by Morris Hayes (lead vocals on "Supernatural") and Nathaniel Alford (lead vocals on "Hey"). We Are King was mixed by Neal Pogue and mastered by Brian "Big Bass" Gardner at Bernie Grundman Mastering. The album cover design was a collaboration between visual artist Geoff Kim and Paris Strother, with photography by Alex King.

== Critical reception ==
Professional ratings
Aggregate scores
Source	Rating
AnyDecentMusic?	7.6/10
Metacritic	83/100
Review scores
Source	Rating
AllMusic	5/5 stars
Billboard	4/5 stars
Exclaim!	7/10
The Irish Times	4/5 stars
Now	4/5
The Observer	4/5 stars
Pitchfork	7.8/10
PopMatters	7/10
Spin	8/10
Uncut	8/10

We Are King and the single "The Greatest" were included on numerous mid-year and year-end lists.

=== Accolades ===
Publication	Ranking	List	Ref
Bandcamp	#1	Best 100 Albums of 2016	
Billboard	#8	10 Best R&B Albums of 2016	
The Guardian	#16	Best Albums of 2016	
Newsday	#22	Best Albums of 2016 So Far	
Noisey	N/A	26 Extremely Dope Overlooked Albums of 2016 (So Far)	
NPR	N/A	100 Favorite Songs of 2016 So Far ["The Greatest"]	
Observer	#10	10 Best R&B Albums of 2016	
Pitchfork	#37	50 Best Albums of 2016	
Pitchfork	#66	100 Best Songs of 2016 ["The Greatest"]	
Pitchfork	N/A	Best 20 Pop and R&B Albums of 2016	
Pop Magazine	#24	Best Albums of 2016	
Rolling Stone	#7	20 Best R&B Albums of 2016	
Spin	#18	101 Best Songs of 2016 ["The Greatest"]	
Spin	#21	Best Albums of 2016	
Stereogum	#45	50 Best Albums of 2016 So Far	
Time	#5	Here Are The Best Albums of 2016 (So Far)	
Uproxx	#14	Best Albums of 2016	

== Track listing ==
All songs written and composed by Paris Strother, Amber Strother and Anita Bias.

No.	Title	Length
1.	"The Right One"	4:46
2.	"The Greatest"	3:15
3.	"Red Eye"	4:38
4.	"Supernatural (Extended Mix)"	6:46
5.	"Love Song"	3:41
6.	"In the Meantime"	4:36
7.	"Carry On"	3:53
8.	"Mister Chameleon"	3:35
9.	"Hey (Extended Mix)"	6:36
10.	"Oh, Please!"	4:51
11.	"The Story (Extended Mix)"	5:13
12.	"Native Land"	5:40
Total length:		57:30

== Personnel ==
Credits adapted from the album's liner notes.

=== King ===
- Paris Strother – producer, composer, instrumentalist, engineer, background vocals (all tracks)
- Amber Strother – composer, vocals, background vocals (all tracks)
- Anita Bias – composer, vocals, background vocals (all tracks)

=== Additional personnel ===
- Kyle Bolden – guitar (tracks 1, 3, 7, 9 & 10)
- Thomas Lea – strings (tracks 3, 4, & 6)
- The Regiment Horns – brass & woodwinds (Tracks 4, 9, & 10)
- Morris Hayes – engineer (track 4)
- Nathaniel Alford – engineer (track 9)
- Neal Pogue – mix engineer (all tracks)
- Brian "Big Bass" Gardner – mastering engineer (all tracks)

=== Cover art personnel ===
- Alex King – photo
- Geoff Kim – cover design
- Paris Strother – cover design
