= Polo & Pan =

French electronic music duo

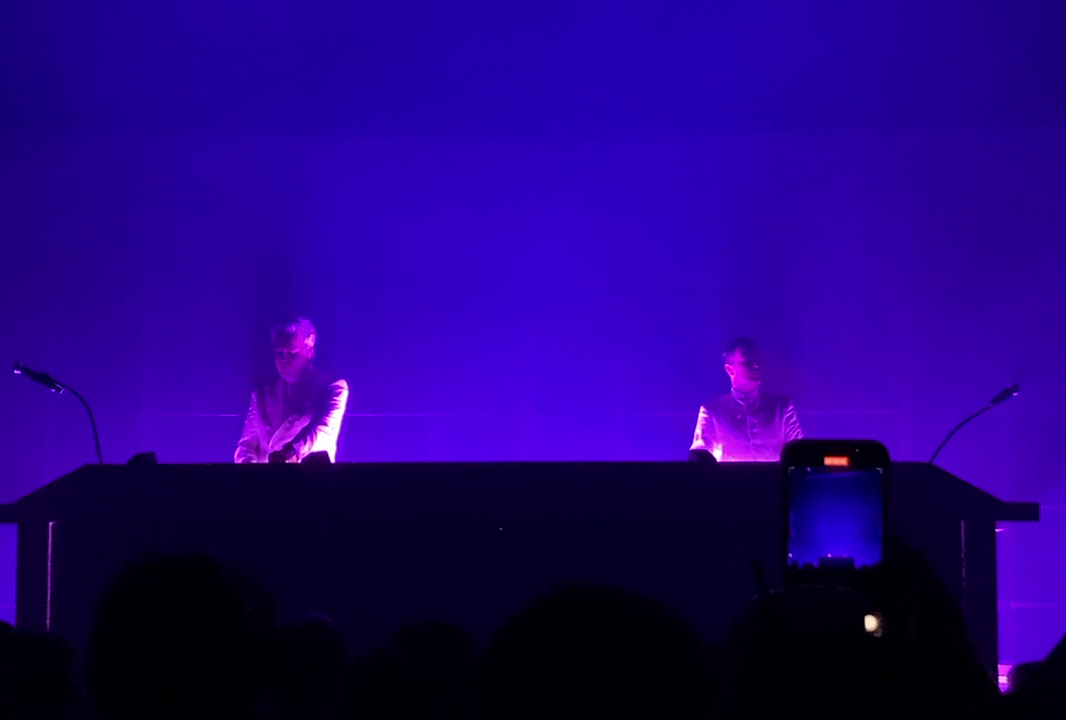
- Polo & Pan at the Rockhal in 2025.

Background information
- Origin: Paris, France
- Genres: House; electronic; tropical house; deep house; world; synth-pop
- Years active: 2013-present
- Labels: Hamburger Records, Ekler'o'Shock
- Members: Paul Armand-Delille (Polo); Alexandre Grynszpan (Pan)
- Website: www.poloandpanmusic.com

Polo & Pan are a French music duo consisting of Paul Armand-Delille (aka Polocorp or Polo) and Alexandre Grynszpan (aka Peter Pan or Pan).

Their music style incorporates a mixture of house-electronic music influenced by tropical sounds and music from all over the world. The duo has released two studio albums and a number of successful EPs.

The 2021 single "Ani Kuni" was their biggest chart song, however, a shorter version of the song titled "Ani Kuni - Edit" has taken its place.

== History ==
The two were known individually due to their performances in the Parisian bar Le Baron where they met in 2012. They initially started out together by mixing existing songs before launching their own careers with original music.

A lot of their early work is found in their debut EP Rivolta and the follow-up EP Dorothy, both of which were released on the Hamburger Records/Ekler'O'Shock labels. Their third EP release Canopée in 2016 resulted in their first charting song, the same-titled "Canopée" produced by Raphaël Hamburger of Hamburger Records and Matthieu Gazier of Ekler'O'shock.

In 2017, they collaborated with musician Jacques Auberger, known by the mononym Jacques, resulting in the single "Jacquadi". This led to the release of their debut studio album Caravelle which was released on 19 May 2017, with the track "Cœur Croisé" released as a single with an accompanying music video. The album was a critical success with Julien Baldacchino of France Inter and by the site Les Inrocks, amongst many. In July 2018, a deluxe edition of the same album was released and in October the same year the EP Mexicali and a tour to promote the album and EP from September to December 2018. The album was certified gold in 2018, alongside a gold certified single "Nanã". The follow-up EP Gengis was made up of remixed tracks rather than original compositions. In 2020, the single "Feel Good" was released followed by a same-titled EP.

June 2021 saw their biggest success, the album Cyclorama carrying the single "Ani Kuni" based on the traditional song "Ani Couni Chaouani", a Native American hymn originating from the Arapaho tribes living on the plains of Colorado and Wyoming in the United States. "Ani Kuni" became Polo & Pan's biggest hit rising to number 10 on the French SNEP singles chart, while also charting on Belgium's Ultratop Wallonia chart.

== Discography ==
=== Studio albums ===
Year	Details	Peak chart positions			Certification
Year	Details	FRA	BEL (Wa)	SWI	Certification
2017	Caravelle: Record label: Hamburger Records / Ekler'O'Shock Records; Date of release: 15 September 2017	87	120	—	SNEP: Platinum
2021	Cyclorama: Record label: Hamburger Records / EOS Records; Date of release: 25 June 2021	10	29	60	SNEP: Gold
2025	22:22: Record label: Hamburger Records / EOS Records; Date of release: 28 March 2025				

Others

- Caravelle (Deluxe) (Hamburger Records / Ekler'O'Shock, 2018)

=== EPs ===
- Rivolta (Hamburger Records, 2013)
- Dorothy (Hamburger Records / Ekler'O'Shock, 2014)
- Plage Isolée (Hamburger Records / Ekler'O'Shock, 2015)
- Canopée (Hamburger Records / EOS Records, 2016)
- Mexicali (Remixes) (Hamburger Records / Ekler'O'Shock, 2018)
- Gengis (Hamburger Records / EOS Records, 2019)
- Feel Good (Hamburger Records / EOS Records, 2020)
- Tunnel (Remixes) (Hamburger Records / EOS Records, 2021)
- Magic (Remixes) (Hamburger Records / EOS Records, 2021)
- Mumia (Hamburger Records / EOS Records, 2023)
- Carrossel do Tempo (Hamburger Records / Ekler'O'Shock Records / Red Axes LTD, 2023)

=== Singles ===
Year	Title	Peak chart positions		Album / Mixtape
Year	Title	FRA	BEL (Wa)	Album / Mixtape
2016	"Canopée"	161	—	Canopée EP / Caravelle
2021	"Ani Kuni"	9	6	Cyclorama

Other releases

- 2013: "Rivolta"
- 2014: "Dorothy"
- 2014: "Boonghusa (Polo & Pan Remix)"
- 2015: "Colombe (Polo & Pan Remix)"
- 2015: "Plage isolée"
- 2015: "Don't Sing (Polo & Pan Remix)"
- 2016: "Brooklyn Amusement Park"
- 2016: "No Madame (Polo & Pan Remix)"
- 2016: "Caravan Boomerang"
- 2016: "Tecknofobia (Polo & Pan Remix)"
- 2016: "Nanã"
- 2016: "Bakara"
- 2016: "Already Know That (Polo & Pan Remix)"
- 2017: "Pluie Fine (Polo & Pan Remix)"
- 2017: "Jacquadi"
- 2017: "Cœur croisé"
- 2017: "Zoom Zoom"
- 2017: "Mexicali"
- 2017: "Aqualand"
- 2018: "Trésor"
- 2018: "Arc-en-ciel"
- 2018: "Canopée (Superorganism Remix)"
- 2018: "Twilight"
- 2018: "Ça Fait Du Bien (Polo & Pan Remix)"
- 2019: "Everybody Wants to Be Famous (Polo & Pan Remix)"
- 2019: "Coeur de Pierre (Polo & Pan Remix)"
- 2019: "Cadenza"
- 2019: "Gengis"
- 2020: "Home Sweet Home - The Mixtape"
- 2020: "Feel Good"
- 2021: "Hello Hello Hello (Polo & Pan Remix)"
- 2021: "Tunnel"
- 2021: "Les Jolies Choses"
- 2022: "Staifia (Polo & Pan Remix)"
- 2022: "From a World to Another"
- 2023: "Odyssey - The Mixtape"
- 2023: "Le Cœur Grenadine (Polo & Pan Remix)"
- 2023: "Je Veux Mourir Avec Toi (Polo & Pan Remix)"
- 2023: "Carrossel do Tempo"
- 2023: "Charanga"
- 2023: "Young Hearts (Polo & Pan Remix)"

== Awards and nominations ==
Award Ceremony	Year	Work	Category	Result
Berlin Music Video Awards	2021	Feel Good	Best Animation	Nominated
Berlin Music Video Awards	2022	TUNNEL	Best Art Director	Nominated
Berlin Music Video Awards	2023	Requiem	Best Concept	Nominated
