= We Are King =

American R&B duo

- Also known as: King
- Origin: Minneapolis, Minnesota, US
- Genres: R&B, dream pop, electronica
- Years active: 2011–present
- Label: King Creative
- Members: Amber Strother; Paris Strother
- Past members: Anita Bias
- Website: weareking.com

We Are King (also stylized as We Are KING), is an American R&B duo based in Los Angeles, California, consisting of twin sisters Amber and Paris Strother. Originally named King, the group also included their close friend Anita Bias. The Strother sisters are the nieces of the Minneapolis, Minnesota-based electric bluesman, Percy Strother, and are originally from Minneapolis.

== Career ==
The trio first appeared in 2011, when, on March 1, they independently released their The Story, a three-song EP that captured the attention and garnered support from a number of artists including Phonte of The Foreign Exchange, Questlove, Erykah Badu, and eventually Prince, who invited the two to open for him at his 21-Night Stand Tour at the Los Angeles Forum. Prince subsequently became the girls' mentor and advisor, providing them with managerial support until 2013. King founded their company King Creative in 2013, releasing their teaser single "In the Meantime" the same year, premiered by Billboard, and followed up with their second single, "Mister Chameleon" in 2014. On February 5, 2016, the trio released their debut studio album, We Are King, to critical acclaim. The album was nominated for Best Urban Contemporary Album at the 59th Grammy Awards, making King the first independent band to be nominated in that category. We Are King was also included on mid-year and year-end lists by Rolling Stone, Time, Billboard, NPR, Spin, Newsday and Pitchfork, among others.

== Discography ==
Studio albums

Title	Details	Chart positions		
Title	Details	US Billboard 200	Billboard Top R&B/Hip-Hop Albums	Billboard Top Heatseekers
We Are King	Released: February 5, 2016; Label: King Creative; Format: CD, digital download	158	20	1

EPs

- The Story (2011)

Singles

- "In the Meantime" (2013)
- "Mister Chameleon" (2014)
- "The Greatest" (2015)

Covers

- Fela Kuti "Go Slow" (2014)
- David Bowie "Space Oddity" (2021)
- Maurice Ravel "Prélude En La Minuer" (2021)

== Collaborations ==
Features

- Coldplay & We Are KING & Jacob Collier - "Human Heart"
- Nicolas Godin featuring We Are KING - “Another Side"
- Robert Glasper featuring We Are KING - “Move Love"
- Miles Davis & Robert Glasper featuring We Are KING - "Song For Selim"
- The Foreign Exchange featuring Paris and Amber Strother - “All the Kisses"
- Sam Sparro featuring We Are KING - “Outside the Blue"
- Devin Morrisson featuring We Are KING - "The Call (407)" (from Bussin') ; "My Love" (from Sakura)
- Alex Isley featuring Paris Strother - "So Here it Goes"

Songwriting, Musician, Vocal and Production Credits

- Coldplay - “Coloratura", "Human Heart" (from Music of the Spheres), "Aeterna", "A Wave" (from Moon Music)
- Leon Bridges - “Motorbike", 'Details", "Steam", "Sho Nuff", "Don't Worry"
- Corrine Bailey Rae - “Green Aphrodisiac", "Tell Me", "Horse Print Dress", "Been to the Moon" (from The Heart Speaks in Whispers), "Red Horse", "He Will Follow You With His Eyes" (from Black Rainbows)
- Moses Sumney - "Quarrel"
- Logic - “Thank You"
- Bilal - “Right at the Core"
- Robert Glasper Experiment - “Move Love"
- Jill Scott - “So Gone"
- Kendrick Lamar - “Chapter 6"
- Nick Hakim - "Qadir"
- Baby Rose - "Show You", "Sold Out", "Pressure"
- Eric Roberson - "Just Imagine"
- Avicii - "Lay Me Down"
- Kelela - "Sorbet"
- Kelsey Lu - "Comfort"
- Dua Saleh - "2excited"

== Awards and nominations ==
Year	Award ceremony	Category	Work	Result	Ref.
2017	Grammy Awards	Best Urban Contemporary Album	We Are King	Nominated	
2023	Grammy Awards	Album of the Year (Note: as featured artist on "Human Heart")	Music of the Spheres	Nominated	
