= Petrouchka (song) =

- Cover of remix featuring RAF Camora

Single by Soso Maness featuring PLK

from the album Avec le temps
- Language: French
- Released: 5 June 2021
- Genre: French rap
- Length: 3:09
- Label: Maness Production; Sony Music
- Songwriters: Junior Alaprod; Soso Maness; PLK

Music video
- "Petrouchka" on YouTube

"Petrouchka" is a song by French rapper Soso Maness in collaboration with PLK. The music is largely based on the Russian traditional folk song "Kalinka", a musical work by Russian composer Ivan Petrovitsj Larionov. The song reached number-one on the French Singles Charts and in Wallonia.

== Charts ==
=== Weekly charts ===
Weekly chart performance for "Petrouchka"
Chart (2021)	Peak position
Belgium (Ultratop 50 Wallonia)	1
France (SNEP)	1
Switzerland (Schweizer Hitparade)	15

=== Year-end charts ===
Year-end chart performance for "Petrouchka"
Chart (2021)	Position
Belgium (Ultratop Wallonia)	45
France (SNEP)	2
