= The Flavor =

Former American hip hop magazine (1992–1996)

The Flavor Magazine
- Editor: Alison Pember
- Categories: Music Magazine
- Frequency: Monthly
- Publisher: Alison Pember
- Founder: Alison Pember (Founder), Rachel Crick (Co-Founder)
- Founded: 1992
- First issue: Issue #1 - March 1992
- Final issue: Issue #34 - 1996
- Country: United States
- Based in: Seattle, WA
- Language: English

The Flavor was an American hip hop magazine published between 1992 and 1996.

== History ==
The Flavor was co-founded by Alison Pember and Rachel Crick. Published in Seattle, the first issue arrived in March 1992, and the magazine included interviews, features, reviews, and "scene reports" from across North America and around the globe. Within the Pacific Northwest, the magazine was distributed for free at record stores, barber shops, clothing stores, and other community businesses. Outside the region, it was distributed globally through Tower Records where it was sold for $1.

Initially they had a print run of 10,000 copies per issue, which grew to a peak of 70,000. After several of the editorial staff members left for other jobs, The Flavor closed in 1996.

== Issue history ==
The Flavor Magazine published 34 issues between 1992 and 1996. The following tables provide a chronological overview of the publication's issues.

=== 1992 ===
Issue	Publication Month	Stories & Interviews
1	Mar.	Debut issue - Cypress Hill, Resident Alien, Tim Dog, Del Tha Funkee Homosapien, Brothers of The Same Mind
2	Jun.	Beastie Boys, Lord Finesse, Black Sheep, Fu-Schnickens, Gang Starr, Organized Konfusion, Ex-Presidents, Sir Jinx
3	Sept.	Pete Rock & C.L. Smooth, Fu-Schnickens, Das Efx, Nice & Smooth, Show Biz & A.G., Nasty Nes
4	Dec.	Da Lench Mob, Digable Planets, J The Law & B-Mello, MC Serch, Zhigge, Diamond D, Kool G Rap & DJ Polo, YZ

=== 1993 ===
Issue	Publication Month	Stories & Interviews
5	Jan./Feb.	Brand Nubian, The Pharcyde, Pete Nice, Language of The Hip, Kurious Jorge, Bobbito & Stretch Armstrong
6	Apr./May	Guru, The Beatnuts, Mobb Deep, Positive K, El Mafioso, Freestyle Fellowship
7	Jun./Jul.	The Jungle Brothers, Cypress Hill, Funkdoobiest, Da Youngstas, Masta Ace, Elevators, Lords of The Underground
8	Aug./Sept.	Leaders of The New School, Del, Ultramagnetic MC's, Yo-Yo, The Pharcyde, Phat Wax Artists
9	Oct./Nov.	De La Soul, KRS One, Monica Lynch, Souls of Mischief, Black Moon, B-Mello, Casual, A Tribe Called Quest
10	Dec./Jan.	The First Annual Flavor Awards, Poor Righteous Teachers, Wu Tang Clan, Kurious, Erick Sermon, M.C. Class, Sin Q

=== 1994 ===
* Note: Issue #14 was printed as June in error

Issue	Publication Month	Stories & Interviews
11	Feb.	Nas, Ice Cube, Shyheim, Del The Funky Homosapien, Ghetto Chilldren
12	Mar.	Gang Starr, Coolio, Hard 2 Obtain, Sinsemilla, Blind Council, Jace and The Fourth Party
13	Apr.	The Beatnuts, KMD, MC Solaar, Crooked Path, Silver Shadow D, The Flavor's 2nd Annual Anniversary Bash
14	*Jun.	Seattle Hip History, Chilly Uptown, Sir Mix-A-Lot, Nasty Nes, Beastie Boys, M.O.P., Dred Scott
15	Jun.	Jeru The Damaja, Smif-N-Wessun, MC Eiht, Carmelita Sanchez, 22nd Precinct
16	Jul.	Organized Konfusion, Warren G, Artifacts, Source of Labor, Steve Rifkind Company
17	Aug.	OC, Mic Geronimo, Ricardo Frazer, Saafir, Black Moon, Tha Alkaholiks
18	Sept.	Extra Prolific, Gravediggaz, Notorious B.I.G., Craig Mack, Common Sense, Russell Simmons
19	Oct.	Pete Rock & C.L. Smooth, Digable Planets, Lollapalooza
20	Nov.	Black Sheep, Ras Kass, The Coup
21	Dec.	Tha Alkaholiks, Jemini, Keith Murray, Brand Nubian

=== 1995 ===
Issue	Publication Month	Stories & Interviews
22	Feb.	Lord Finesse, Big L, The Roots, Milk, Bas Blasta
23	Mar.	Mobb Deep, The B.U.M.S., Channel Live, Blackalicious
24	Apr.	Show & A.G., Ol' Dirty Bastard, Masta Ace, Milkbone
25	May.	Western Hemisfear, Funkdoobiest, Heather B
26	Jul.	Special Ed, Grand Puba, Naughty By Nature, Mad Skillz, Sea Sick Records, Beastie Boys, Mack 10, Tribal Productions, Hurricane, Key Kool & Rhettmatic, Source of Labor, Show & A.G.
27	Aug.	The Genius, Kool G. Rap, W.C. & The MAAD Circle, Raekwon, Aceyalone, King Just, Moore Paine Inc., Prose & Concepts, Sharpshooters, Urban Threadz
28	Sept.	The Pharcyde, Souls of Mischief, Junior M.A.F.I.A., Ill Biskits, Cipher, Blind Council, Spyc-e, Raw Produce, Tracii McGregor, Rocksteady Anniversary, Bomb The Suburbs
29	Oct.	AZ, DVS Floorrockers, Fat Joe, Lost Boyz, Narcotik, Infinite, Peanut Butter Wolf, Homeliss Derilex, Jurassic 5, Funk Daddy
30	Nov.	Group Home, Mic Geronimo, Bahamadia, Mr. Supreme & B-Max, Jive Radio Jam, How Can I Be Down?, Zulu Nation Anniversary, Powerrule, Slum Brothers, RMF/Bad Boy Funk Entertainment, Gordon Curvey
31	Dec.	Funk Daddy, Mystikal, Q-Ball & Curt Cazal, What's The Name of This Nation, Black Anger, Ethnomusicology, JT The Bigga Figga, The Vinyl Exchange, West Coast DMC Championships

=== 1996 ===
Issue	Publication Month	Stories & Interviews
32	Feb.	The Fugees, The X-Men, Class of 1996: Seattle Hip-Hop Graduateds to The Next Level on 14 Fathoms Deep, Beyond Reality, Blind Council, The Crew Clockwise, DMS, Ghetto Chilldren, Jace, Supreme (Mad Fanatic), Narkotic, Native So/Un, Prose & Concepts, Sinsemilla, DJ Kamikaze of S.O.L., 22nd Precinct, Union of Opposites
33		Busta Rhymes, Chino XL, Source of Labor, Bobby Seale, B-Boy Summit III, Mystik Journeymen
34		De La Soul, J-Live, Goodie Mob, Def Jam 10 Year Anniversary - The final issue

== Staff & Contributors ==
=== Founder(s) ===
- Alison Pember - Co-Founder
- Rachel Crick - Co-Founder

=== Staff ===
- Traé Abraham
- James Browne
- Mike Clark
- Robin Counts (Force)
- Stephanie Cross (Selden)
- DJ B Mello
- Sarah "SK" Honda
- Carl Johnson
- Josh Kendall
- Pamela Kreider (art director),
- Mr. Supreme (Danny Clavesilla aka Supreme La Rock)
- Mr. Tracy Armour
- Joshua Ortega
- Chris Risdon
- Joe Schloss
- Strath Shepard
- Spyridon
- Delon Williams

=== Ad Sales ===
- Scott Griggs
- Steffani Jesus

=== Graphic Designers ===
- Son Duong
- Soul One
- Specs

=== Intern ===
- Collette Robinson

=== Photographers ===
- Ron Archer
- B+ (Brian Cross)
- Leonard Carter
- Rachel Crick

=== Contributors ===
- Roy Atizado
- Jay Barber
- Steve Bassett
- Beni B, BGD
- Black Tek
- Concave Dave Blackburn
- Bobbito Garcia
- Fred Bomber
- Boogie Boy
- Charlie R. Braxton
- Matt "Head Clown" Brown
- C-Rule
- Sarah Cain
- Jay E. Cee
- Chas
- Chino
- Dao-Yi Chow (Durwin Chow/Shcemz GNS)
- Tobin Costen
- Cut Cannibal C
- Wendy Day
- DJ Neil Armstrong
- DJ Powerlord
- DJ Zed
- Kay Dougherty
- Dulce-Love (Cristina Verán)
- DV One
- E-Legal (Ian McNee)
- E-Rok
- Marc Ferman
- Antoine "Wave" Garnier
- Graham
- Grammer
- Gavin Graves
- Marc Greevey
- Tom Hackett
- Eric "E-Sharp" Hansen
- Teresa Holt
- Mark Humphries
- Shane “Sureshot” Hunt
- J-Swing
- Jacqui M
- Joey
- Robert Johnson
- Jumbo
- Kardbord Klown/Phanatik
- Kay B, Kilocee
- Know One
- Kool Mike
- James L. Lance
- Lisa Latendresse
- MC Emil
- Tracii McGregor
- Adrian Miller
- Mike Nardone
- Nouka
- Novocaine 132
- O-Dub
- Jess Ortega
- Joseph Patel
- Peanut Butter Wolf
- Frank Quattlebaum
- Real Thorough
- Jeny Roy
- Ben Saunders
- MC Serch
- Sert
- Side A (Keith Griego)
- Skitz
- Spence Dookey
- Scott Spencer * Sean Spooner
- Pei Sun
- Supa Dupa
- Supherb
- Syze
- T. Eric Monroe
- Joanna "Jo Jo" Tabora (Dyckhoff)
- Ray Tamara
- Taminika Terry

John Valez

- Jasmine Vega
- Jake Wicklund
- Aubrey Williams
- Elliott Wilson
- Emily Wines
- Ted Woodberry
- Yusef Afloat
- Z-Trip

== Legacy ==
In 2021, issues of The Flavor were featured in Contact High: A Visual History of Hip-Hop, a traveling exhibition curated by Vikki Tobak and directed by Fab 5 Freddy, in its installation at the Museum of Pop Culture.

In 2018, 206 Zulu presented The Flavor with a 206 Zulu Vanguard Award.

The Flavor has been discussed in hip-hop history books and press retrospectives. Daudi Abe's book Emerald Street: A History of Hip Hop in Seattle (2020) examines the magazine's role in Seattle's hip-hop scene, and Matthew Gasteier's book Nas's Illmatic (2009) states that The Flavor was the first magazine to put Nas on its cover, ahead of the release of Illmatic. A 2023 SPIN magazine retrospective on Seattle hip-hop group the Elevators corroborates this, also noting The Flavor was the first to feature Nas on its cover.
