= Oxnard (disambiguation) =

Oxnard may refer to:

== Places ==
- Oxnard, California, a city in Ventura County, California, U.S.

== Arts, entertainment, and media ==
- Oxnard (album), a 2018 album by Anderson Paak
- Oxnard, Hamtaro character
