= Lonely Eyes =

Lonely Eyes may refer to:

- Lonely Eyes, album by Tom Harrell 1989
- "Lonely Eyes", single by Robert John, written by Mike Piccirillo 1979
- "Lonely Eyes" (Chris Young song), 2014
- "Lonely Eyes", song by Kata, written E. Fisherman 1989
- "Lonely Eyes", song by Platinum Weird from Make Believe
- "Lonely Eyes", song by Randy Barlow
