= Oxnard (album) =

Studio album by Anderson .Paak
- Released: November 16, 2018
- Studio: The ICU (Brentwood); Nice Vibe; Record One (Los Angeles); OBE (Hollywood)
- Genre: Hip-hop; funk; soul; R&B
- Length: 56:19
- Label: 12Tone; Aftermath; OBE
- Producer: 9th Wonder; Anderson .Paak; Callum and Kiefer; Chris Dave; Dr. Dre; Jairus "J.Mo" Mozee; Jason Pounds; Jhair Lazo; Jose Rios; King Michael Coy; Mell; Om'Mas Keith; Q-Tip; Ron Avant; Tia Myrie

Anderson .Paak chronology
Malibu (2016)	Oxnard (2018)	Ventura (2019)

Singles from Oxnard
- 1. "Tints" Released: October 4, 2018; 2. "Who R U?" Released: November 9, 2018

Oxnard is the third studio album by American singer Anderson .Paak. It was released on November 16, 2018, by 12Tone Music, Aftermath Entertainment, and OBE. The album features guest appearances from Kadhja Bonet, Norelle, Kendrick Lamar, Sonyae Elise, Dr. Dre, Cocoa Sarai, Pusha T, Snoop Dogg, The Last Artful, Dodgr, J. Cole, Q-Tip, and BJ the Chicago Kid.

Oxnard was supported by two singles: "Tints" and "Who R U?" The album received generally positive reviews from critics, and debuted at number 11 on the US Billboard 200.

== Background and release ==
Oxnard is Paak's first album released on Aftermath Entertainment and 12Tone Music, and the last of his "beach series", following 2014's Venice and 2016's Malibu. The album features contributions from Dr. Dre, who was heavily involved in the making of the album and served as an executive producer. In an interview with Rolling Stone, Paak stated, "This is the album I dreamed of making in high school, when I was listening to Jay-Z's The Blueprint, The Game's The Documentary, and Kanye West's The College Dropout."

== Promotion ==
The lead single from the album, "Tints" featuring Kendrick Lamar, was released on October 4, after premiering on Zane Lowe's Beats 1 show. On October 10, Paak announced that the album would be released on November 16 and revealed the album cover. On October 26, the music video for "Tints" was released exclusively on Apple Music, as well as a pre-order of the album, revealing its track listing. On November 9, Paak released "Who R U?" as the second single from the album.

== Critical reception ==
Professional ratings
Aggregate scores
Source	Rating
AnyDecentMusic?	7.0/10
Metacritic	73/100
Review scores
Source	Rating
AllMusic	4/5 stars
Consequence	B
Exclaim!	7/10
The Guardian	3/5 stars
The Line of Best Fit	7/10
NME	4/5 stars
The Observer	4/5 stars
Pitchfork	7.0/10
Rolling Stone	3/5 stars
XXL	4/5

Oxnard was met with generally positive reviews. At Metacritic, which assigns a normalized rating out of 100 to reviews from professional publications, the album received an average score of 73, based on 18 reviews. Aggregator AnyDecentMusic? gave it 7.0 out of 10, based on their assessment of the critical consensus.

Andy Kellman of AllMusic said, "Although Paak is still an R&B artist more so than a hip-hop one, he continues to be a stylistic outlier. Rather than pander, testify, or even seduce, he tends to express the blues when he sings". El Hunt of NME stated, "In contrast to previous albums, this wasn't made while sofa-surfing to make ends meet. As Anderson .Paak puts it, he was eating calamari and lobster instead – "every day is Christmas!" he declares dryly on "Mansa Musa". Post-mainstream breakthrough, Oxnard is a deft dissection of the fallout, just as free-ranging and hopeful as you'd imagine". Kitty Empire of The Observer claimed, "Wealth is a recurrent theme, but musicality remains to the fore. Although .Paak can do trap-influenced beats, he's just as happy marshalling psychedelic guitars and gospel uplift on resonant tracks such as "Brother's Keeper", which also features a blistering verse from Pusha T. The west coast feelgood factor turns a touch obvious when Snoop Dogg arrives for "Anywhere", but there remains a restlessness to .Paak's work.." Magazine publication XXL said, "It may not be quite the full-marks classic he'd hoped, but Oxnard is an intriguing next step for the 2016 XXL Freshman that demands repeat listening and hints that he may have a Blueprint in him yet". Kitty Richardson of The Line of Best Fit stated, "A still-formidable effort, but perhaps not the homecoming .Paak would have produced if he'd decided to go his own way".

Amongst the more mixed reviews, Rachel Aroesti concluded for The Guardian that "This meeting of joy and aggression is what defines Oxnard, and the effect is not always pleasant – it makes .Paak's trademark grooves difficult to luxuriate in – but it is still a compelling mode, and one that rehomes his old-school tastes firmly in the present". Mosi Reeves from Rolling Stone suggested "Some of the album's best tracks like "6 Summers" – where Paak cheekily turns a bizarre fantasy about a supposed Trump love child into a party chant – sway and churn with no clear direction. Meanwhile, Dre's engineering role proves a mixed blessing. While the good doctor applies his mixing skills with the loving touch of a man polishing a Chevy Chevelle, resulting in the aural equivalent of a Hollywood blockbuster lathered in Dolby-quality boom, much of what made Paak's early work so fantastic is forgotten. There's none of the grungy Blaxploitation soul that fueled Yes Lawd!, his 2016 NxWorries project with L.A. beat loop expert Knxwledge, even though it was that group's 2015 "Suede" single that reportedly inspired Dre to sign Paak in the first place".

=== Year-end lists ===
Select year-end rankings of Oxnard
Publication	List	Rank	Ref.
ABC News	50 Best Albums of 2018	7	
Complex	The Best Albums of 2018	44	
GQ (Russia)	The Best Music Albums of 2018	3	
NME	Best Albums of the Year 2018	90	

== Track listing ==
Oxnard track listing
No.	Title	Writer(s)	Producer(s)	Length
1.	"The Chase" (featuring Kadhja Bonet)	Kadhja Bonet; Brandon Anderson; Jairus Mozee	Jhair Lazo; Anderson .Paak; Bonet^{[b]}	3:23
2.	"Headlow" (featuring Norelle)	Anderson; Jose Rios; Bonet; Michael Redict; Ron Avant	Rios; King Michael Coy; Avant	4:10
3.	"Tints" (featuring Kendrick Lamar)	Anderson; Jeff Gitelman; Sydney Bennett; Robert Lewis; Kendrick Duckworth; David Pimentel; Taylor Parks; Om'Mas Keith	Keith; .Paak	4:28
4.	"Who R U?"	Anderson; Dwayne Abernathy Jr.; Sylvester Jordan; Andre Young; Melvin Henderson; Andre Brissett	Dr. Dre; Mell; Dem Jointz^{[b]}; Brissett^{[b]}	2:48
5.	"6 Summers"	Anderson; Jason Pounds; Henderson; Tia Myrie	.Paak; Mell; Pounds^{[a]}	4:42
6.	"Saviers Road"	Anderson; Patrick Douthit; Myrie	9th Wonder	2:24
7.	"Smile / Petty" (featuring Sonyae Elise)	Anderson; Keifer Shackleford; Matthew Merisola	Callum and Kiefer; King Michael Coy	4:42
8.	"Mansa Musa" (featuring Dr. Dre and Cocoa Sarai)	Brissett; Young; Anderson; Abernathy Jr.; Eric Mercer; Henderson; Jordan; Myrie; Yannick Koffi	Mell; Dr. Dre; Focus...^{[b]}; Brissett^{[b]}	2:53
9.	"Brother's Keeper" (featuring Pusha T)	Anderson; Abernathy Jr.; Mozee; Bonet; Terrence Thornton	.Paak; Jairus "J.Mo" Mozee; Dem Jointz^{[a]}	4:14
10.	"Anywhere" (featuring Snoop Dogg and The Last Artful, Dodgr)	Alana Chenevert; Anderson; Calvin Broadus Jr.; Pounds; Peter Hernandez; Reagan James	Pounds	3:46
11.	"Trippy" (featuring J. Cole)	Jermaine Cole; Anderson; Chris Dave; Curt Chambers; Cleo Sample	Dave	5:23
12.	"Cheers" (featuring Q-Tip)	Brissett; Young; Anderson; Kamaal Fareed; Jordan	Focus...; Q-Tip; Dr. Dre; Brissett^{[a]}	5:34
Total length:				48:27

Bonus tracks
No.	Title	Writer(s)	Producer(s)	Length
13.	"Sweet Chick" (featuring BJ the Chicago Kid)	Anderson; Bryan Sledge; Henderson; Jordan; Myrie	Mell	3:57
14.	"Left to Right"	Young; Anderson; Pounds; Henderson; Jordan; Myrie; Trevor Smith Jr.	Pounds; Mell; Dr. Dre	3:55
Total length:				56:19

Notes

- ^{^[a]} signifies a co-producer
- ^{^[b]} signifies an additional producer
- "The Chase" features skit vocals by Sinoi Mataali and Jhair Lazo
- "Headlow" features additional vocals by Kadhja Bonet, background vocals by Nicolas Hakim, and skit vocals by Jhair Lazo, Jason Pounds, and Fredwreck
- "Tints" features additional vocals by Teddy Ray, J.LBS, and Tayla Parx, and skit vocals by Jason Pounds, Jhair Lazo, and Teddy Ray
- "Who R U?" features additional vocals by Cocoa Sarai and Dr. Dre
- "6 Summers" features additional vocals by Jason Johnson, KRS-One, Kadhja Bonet, and Cocoa Sarai
- "Saviers Road" features additional vocals by Cocoa Sarai
- "Smile / Petty" features background vocals by Eliza, Ruby Velle, and Sir
- "Mansa Musa" features additional vocals by Rich Harrison, Dem Jointz, Sly Pyper, Blakk Soul, and Thurz
- "Brother's Keeper" features background vocals by Kadhja Bonet and Cocoa Sarai
- "Anywhere" features additional vocals by Cocoa Sarai
- "Trippy" features additional vocals by Kadhja Bonet
- "Cheers" features additional vocals by Cocoa Sarai and Sly Pyper
- "Sweet Chick" features additional vocals by Cocoa Sarai
- "Left to Right" features additional vocals by Foota Hype and Busta Rhymes, and background vocals by Cocoa Sarai

== Personnel ==
Credits adapted from Tidal.

- Anderson .Paak – vocals (all tracks), drums (1, 3, 9)
- Ron Avant – vocoder (10)
- Kadhja Bonet – strings (1–2, 9)
- Mike Bozzi – masterer (3, 14)
- Stephen Bruner (Note: Bruner's first name is misspelled as "Steven" in the album's credits.) – bass (14)
- Curt Chambers – bass (11)
- Dr. Dre – executive producer, mixer (all tracks)
- Fredwreck – additional guitar (1), percussion (1, 5), additional piano (5), sounds (14)
- Quentin Gilkey – mixing engineer (all tracks)
- Jeff Gitelman – guitar (3)
- Kelsey Gonzales – bass (2, 5), guitar (5, 14)
- Eric Gonzalez – engineer (3–5, 10, 13)
- Eric Griggs – additional piano, bass (12)
- Om'Mas Keith – engineer (3)
- Johnny Kosich – engineer (3)
- Jhair Lazo – engineer (1–11, 13–14), sounds (13)
- Rob Lewis – piano (3)
- Vic Luevanos – engineer (8, 12–13)
- Danny McKinnon – additional guitar (3)
- Vicky Nguyen – piano (5, 13–14)
- Marcus Paul – trumpet (14)
- Pomo – drums, engineer, synthesizer (3)
- Sly Pyper – saxophone (12)
- The Regiment – horn (1)
- Jose Rios – guitar (3, 7)
- Lola A. Romero – assistant engineer (1–2), engineer (3–13)
- Matt Schaeffer – engineer (3)
- Julio Ulloa – engineer (7, 9–11)

== Charts ==
Chart performance for Oxnard
Chart (2018)	Peak position
Australian Albums (ARIA)	20
Belgian Albums (Ultratop Flanders)	25
Belgian Albums (Ultratop Wallonia)	135
Canadian Albums (Billboard)	17
Danish Albums (Hitlisten)	31
Dutch Albums (Album Top 100)	21
French Albums (SNEP)	117
Irish Albums (IRMA)	36
Japan Hot Albums (Billboard Japan)	76
New Zealand Albums (RMNZ)	23
Norwegian Albums (VG-lista)	37
Swiss Albums (Schweizer Hitparade)	46
UK Albums (OCC)	42
US Billboard 200	11
US Top R&B/Hip-Hop Albums (Billboard)	6
