= Jazzbo =

Jazzbo may refer to:

- Al "Jazzbo" Collins (1919–1997), American disc jockey and musician
- Joseph "Jazzbo" Patel (born 1972), American journalist and producer
- Linval Roy "Prince Jazzbo" Carter (1951–2013), Jamaican reggae and dancehall deejay and producer
