= The One: Making a Music Star =

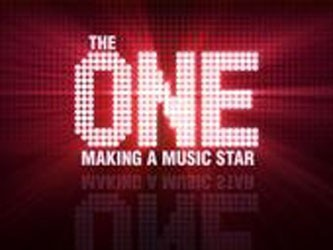
- Genre: Reality music competition
- Starring: George Stroumboulopoulos
- Judges: Kara DioGuardi, Mark Hudson, Andre Harrell
- Country of origin: United States
- Original language: English
- No. of seasons: 1
- No. of episodes: 4

Production
- Executive producer: Matt Kunitz
- Production companies: Pulse:Creative; Endemol USA

Original release
- Network: ABC
- Release: July 18 – July 27, 2006

The One: Making a Music Star is an American reality television series that aired in July 2006 on ABC in the United States, and CBC Television in Canada. The show was hosted by George Stroumboulopoulos, the host of CBC's The Hour. It was advertised as being superior to American Idol and Rock Star with the twist that contestants "live together in a fully functioning music academy", with their actions documented similar to the Big Brother format.

Reportedly one of the most expensive summer series in the history of the ABC network, its first episode, on July 18, 2006, scored the lowest audience for a premiere episode on a major American television network at that time. Subsequent episodes had even fewer viewers. The series was cancelled after two weeks (four episodes) with the final results undecided on July 27, 2006. The show's website proclaimed "there are no plans for additional episodes".

== Overview ==
The One is an adaptation of the Operación Triunfo/Star Academy format owned by Endemol, and was produced by Endemol USA, the producers of Big Brother, Fear Factor, Deal or No Deal, and other reality shows. Star Academy was in fact developed in 2001, around the same time as the original Pop Idol, although the format took much longer to appear in North America. Nonetheless, American Idol's established popularity has contributed to The One being perceived by some viewers and critics as a ripoff of the Idol franchise.

CBC personality Stroumboulopoulos hosted the American series – his selection brought added attention from the Canadian media following the debate over the CBC's decision to air the series. The judges were songwriter Kara DioGuardi, industry veteran Mark Hudson, and former record executive Andre Harrell. The show's executive producer was Fear Factor producer Matt Kunitz. DioGuardi would later become a judge on American Idol, starting with that program's eighth season in 2009.

In promotions leading up to the show's premiere, ABC called The One "the show Fox doesn't want you to see" or "where Idol has never gone", because the contestants would always be competing, even when the stage isn't set, and grudges, rivalries, and breakdowns can develop. In fact, the viewers at home only chose who the bottom 3 are; the judges then saved one, and then the remaining contestants get to vote off a contestant between the other two.

In Canada, The One was promoted by CBC as the must-see event of the summer. Ads for The One ran for several weeks before the show premiered.

The series was initially scheduled to air Tuesday nights from 9:30 to 11:00 p.m. ET/PT (performance), and Wednesday nights from 8:00 to 9:00 p.m. (results), from July 18 to September 6. Prior to the premiere, performance episodes were expanded to two hours starting at 9:00 p.m. ET. At the last minute, the airing of the first results show was changed to 10:00 p.m. ET. A planned further change for the Tuesday episodes, to the 8:30 to 10:00 p.m. ET timeslot, became moot following the show's cancellation.

Viewers in the United States voted through telephone, text messaging or on the Internet. Canadian viewers were required to vote over the Internet only.

== Contestants ==
This was the first version of the Operación Triunfo / Star Academy format to not be completed before the end of the corresponding season. Press reports suggested that the producers would be obliged to name a winner at some point, as The One was a contest, with a recording contract as its grand prize. However, assuming a winner was chosen, it is unlikely that either the selection process or the actual identity of the winner will ever be released.

Contestants are listed in alphabetical order by last name, in format: name, age, hometown.

Contestant	Age	Hometown	Notes
Nick Brownell	21	Sandusky, Ohio	Later appeared on Can You Duet with Jeremiah Richey
Austin Carroll	23	Memphis, Tennessee	
Michael Cole	22	Winston-Salem, North Carolina	
Caitlin Evanson	27	Seattle, Washington	Later went on to sing and play fiddle for Taylor Swift
Scotty Granger	19	New Orleans, Louisiana	Brother of NBA All Star Danny Granger, background singer/keyboard player for Jordin Sparks Later appeared on Platinum Hit and placed third
Adam McInnis	25	Jackson, New Jersey	
Jackie Mendez	23	Miami, Florida	Made Hollywood on American Idol 2009 (Season 8)
Syesha Mercado	19	Sarasota, Florida	Later placed third on American Idol 2008
Jeremiah Richey	25	Waxahachie, Texas	Later appeared on Can You Duet with Nick Brownell

=== Eliminated contestants ===
Contestant	Age	Hometown	Eliminated
Jadyn Maria	21	Nashville, Tennessee	Week 1
Aubrey Collins	18	Littleton, Colorado	Week 2

== Viewer and critical response ==
Viewership and ratings per episode of The One: Making a Music Star
No.	Title	Air date	Timeslot (ET)	Rating/share (18–49)	Viewers (millions)
1	"Episode 1"	July 18, 2006	Tuesday 9:00 p.m.	1.1/3	3.08
2	"Episode 2"	July 19, 2006	Wednesday 10:00 p.m.	1.0/3	2.63
3	"Episode 3"	July 25, 2006	Tuesday 9:00 p.m.	0.9/3	2.60
4	"Episode 4"	July 26, 2006	Wednesday 8:00 p.m.	1.0/3	2.98

At the time of its premiere, according to overnight ratings from Nielsen Media Research, the first episode of The One was the lowest-rated series premiere in ABC history, and the second-worst such episode in the history of American broadcast television, scoring only 3.2 million total viewers (1.1 rating in the 18-49 demographic), and fifth place in its timeslot. In Canada, the premiere of The One on CBC had 236,000 viewers, which trailed far behind Canadian Idol on CTV and Rock Star: Supernova on Global, each scoring around one million viewers.

The next night's results episode fared even worse in the U.S. ratings, sinking to a 1.0 rating in the 18-49 demographic. The re-run of night 1's episode (which preceded the results show) plunged to an embarrassingly low 0.6 average in the vital demo ratings. The poor performance of the show helped ABC measure its lowest-rated night in the network's history (among 18-49s), finishing tied for sixth place. The series was ultimately cancelled after a second week of poor results.

According to CBC executive Kirstine Layfield, in terms of resources and money, The One "had the most backing from ABC than any summer show has ever had (sic)."

Canadian ratings have dipped as low as 150,000 – not necessarily out of step with the CBC's usual summer ratings, although much lower than the broadcaster's stated expectations for primetime audiences, in the one-million range.

The CBC initially insisted that despite the cancellation, a planned Canadian version may still go ahead, citing the success of the format in Quebec (Star Académie) and Britain (the BBC's Fame Academy). The network confirmed that the show will not air in fall 2006 – in fact, the show had never been given a fall timeslot – but the show was "still under development."

Critical response was limited but generally negative. The Hollywood Reporter's Ray Richmond called the series "clearly derivative and opportunistic" with the judges' comments "awkward and forced."

A 2018 retrospective article on the site TV by the Numbers noted that The One was one of several music-related flops ABC had attempted in the 21st century and that The One in particular represented a "nadir" among them, even as shows several years later would have lower ratings. The article also noted that, in general, "ABC is terrible at music shows" and had yet to have a successful show in the genre before buying the rights to American Idol that year.

In January 2025, Endemol Shine North America head Sharon Levy told Deadline Hollywood that the company was in the process of pitching a new iteration of the Star Academy format to potential outlets.

== CBC simulcast controversy ==
In Canada, The One garnered most of its attention for a reason that had little to do with the show's content: CBC Television aired the U.S. series, usually in simulcast, marking the first simulcast of an American primetime network series on that network in several years, and in some cases bumping the network's flagship newscast The National to another timeslot.

Some speculated that the U.S. simulcast was a condition of the CBC's rights to produce a Canadian English version during the 2006–07 season. The network would not confirm this, although it noted that it wanted to build an audience for the Canadian version and would rather air both than have a Canadian version on CBC competing with the American series on a rival Canadian network. Both editions of The One were part of a wider strategy by the network to increase its viewership, which has steadily decreased since funding cutbacks made to the public broadcaster in the early 1990s.

Because of ABC's scheduling, and because most episodes of The One aired live, The National was moved from its usual time slot of 10:00 p.m. on days when The One aired to 11:00 p.m. in the Eastern Time Zone (after The One), and to 9:00 p.m. in the Atlantic Time Zone (prior to The One). All other regions maintained The National at 10:00 p.m. In Manitoba and portions of Northwestern Ontario which also observe Central Time, The One concluded prior to The National's regular airtime. In other western provinces, The One aired, on tape delay, prior to its airing on corresponding "local" ABC affiliates, leaving The National untouched.

The two shows were only expected to conflict on Tuesday nights, although the timeslot change for the first Wednesday results show caused another conflict.

The airing of the program on CBC was seen as controversial not only because of the time shifting, but because it appears to contradict the corporation's mission as a public broadcaster that explains Canada to Canadians, which led to CBC Television dropping all primetime U.S. network series in the late 1990s. Lobby group Friends of Canadian Broadcasting described the move as "shocking and surprising" and says the decision also contradicts CBC president Robert Rabinovitch's fall 2005 claim that "we don't do reality television". Actors' union ACTRA called the decision a "sell-out". And in an acceptance speech for an award from the Canadian Journalism Foundation, read by his wife at a ceremony held during the debacle, former CBC anchor Knowlton Nash said, "If the CBC really wants reality TV, let people get the reality of what's happening in the world by turning on The National at 10 p.m. every night," construed by most as an indictment of the One decision.

For his part, while current anchor Peter Mansbridge told the Toronto Star he was not happy with the move, he said this scenario was no worse than the newscast's other time changes during, for instance, the NHL playoffs. He also expressed optimism that a Canadian version could be a "good lead-in" to The National, which was (and has since remained) behind CTV National News and Global National in the Canadian network newscast ratings.

The CBC later issued a lengthy response to the criticism, including the announcement that "Canadians will still be able to watch The National at its regularly scheduled times (9 [ET; 10 p.m. AT] & 10 p.m. [ET]) on CBC Newsworld" on the affected nights. Normally, the all-news channel airs The National at 9:00 ET followed by documentaries at 10:00 ET.

Following the cancellation, The National was no longer affected by The One, meaning that its normal schedule resumed on July 31. However, the controversy of why CBC Television aired a "copycat", and ultimately low-rated, foreign series continued in cultural circles. Even so, the CBC did not hold back from adding more simulcast American series to its primetime schedule: in fall 2008, the public network added U.S. game show Jeopardy! (and, the following season, Wheel of Fortune) in primetime, again simsubbing U.S. broadcasts in most markets; these shows would leave the CBC schedule in the fall of 2012.

Immediately after the series ended, the CBC said it was still deciding whether to proceed with a Canadian version. With the fall 2006 announcement of a different CBC series in the same vein, Triple Sensation, and later in 2008, a Canadian version of How Do You Solve a Problem like Maria?, it now seems unlikely a Canadian edition of The One will ever be produced.

In addition to the CBC version, TVA was already producing a much more successful French-Canadian version, Star Académie, which completed its fifth season in 2012. Since 2013, TVA has also seen tremendous success with La Voix, with a new season airing annually, and two spin-off seasons of La Voix Junior in 2016 and 2017.
