= Scotty Granger =

American singer (born 1987)

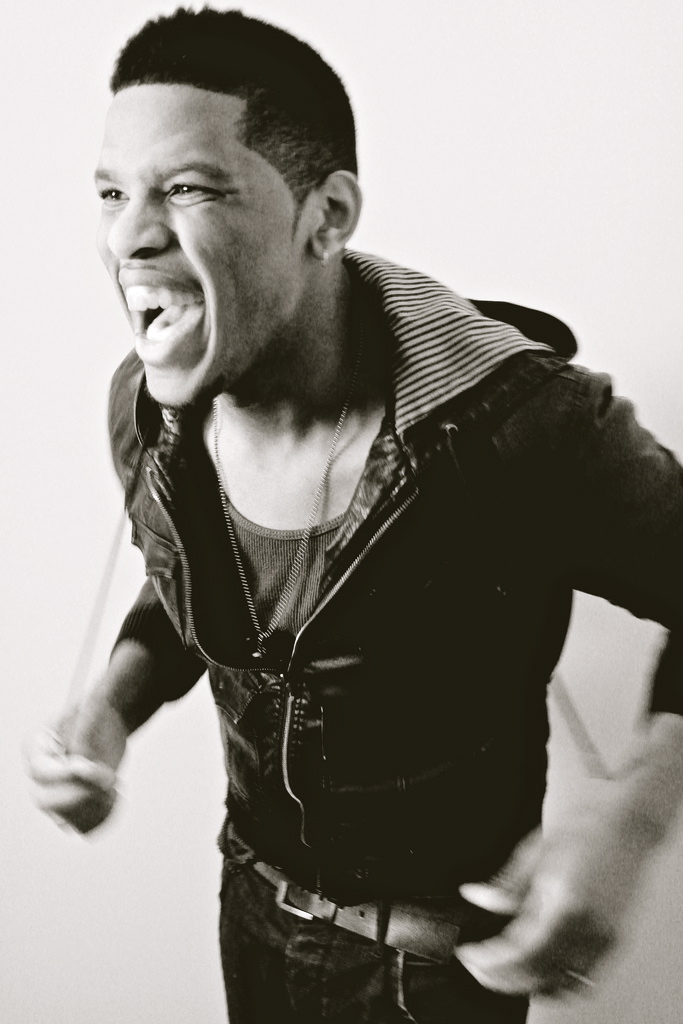

Background information
- Also known as: Scotty Grand, Scotty G
- Born: July 19, 1987 (age 39); New Orleans, Louisiana, U.S.
- Genres: R&B; soul
- Occupations: Singer; songwriter; record producer
- Instrument: Vocals
- Years active: 1998–present
- Label: Jam Tight
- Website: www.scottygrand.com

Scotty Granger (born July 19, 1987) is an American record producer, singer and songwriter.

Granger is the nephew of Mahalia Jackson. After adopting the stage name Scotty Grand in 2011, he embarked on a solo recording career, and in November of that year, signed a publishing deal with Sony/ATV Music Publishing.

He wrote songs for other musical acts before gaining fame taking part in Platinum Hit on Bravo and finishing third overall in the competition. In 2021, Grand, became part of the songwriting team that wrote the theme song for ABC's reboot of The Wonder Years. Titled "All I Know", it has since won awards such as an HMMA (Hollywood Music in Media Award).

== Career ==
He started singing and taking part in musical competitions when he was seven years old. In 1998, he appearing on his first televised show from the Apollo Theatre in Harlem, New York, where he won between 10 participating kids. He released his debut album titled Revelations of Music on New Orleans–based label, Jam Tight Records.

In 2004, while still in high school, he released his second album So Natural with Poetik Arkhitekture Inc. that included the 2005 class song for his high school "Class Dismissed" which he performed at the graduation.

In the summer of 2006, at 18 years, he appeared on another reality TV show titled The One: Making a Music Star on ABC, becoming the youngest participant in the show.

He studied at Berklee College of Music in Boston, Massachusetts, then moved to Los Angeles. Scotty began touring with Jordin Sparks' back in 2007 performing and acting as Creative Director for her live shows as well as backing her on keyboards and vocals including at Sparks' Battlefield Tour.

During the summer of 2008 he released his writing debut single internationally in the dance music/techno genre with "A Higher Love" charting on various European dance charts. His works have appeared in mixes and dance compilations albums selling over platinum status in more than 6 countries. Mr. Grand has acted as music producer/songwriter in international dance hits like DJ Jose's "Like That", DJ Antoine's Live It Alive" and "Monday, Tuesday, Wednesday" and Hi Tack's "I Don't Mind" and Roy Gate's "I Am Music".

On June 10, 2009, he appeared as "Scotty 'Songbird' Granger" on the ABC show Wipeout in Episode 4 The Sisterhood of the Travelling Hot Pants in season 2 of the show and the first person who was able to cross the Sweeper Run successfully. He won $50,000.

He took part in Platinum Hit songwriting competition (see below). He released his third studio album A Songwriter's Right showcasing his songwriting talents in many genres including R&B, dance, pop and country.

== In Platinum Hit ==
Granger was one of the 12 finalists on Bravo's 2011 series Platinum Hit, a competition about songwriting. He reached the finale (Final 3) and performed his own composition "Beautiful You". He won third overall behind winner Sonyae Elise and runner-up Jes Hudak.

Performances

Week	Date of broadcast	Hook / Song Composer	Team	
1	May 30, 2011	"The One" by Scotty Granger	Scotty Granger (main); Brian Judah (team member); Nevin James (team member)	The Songwriter (Granger) was on the Losing Song entries but was not eliminated
2	June 6, 2011	"Paint the Club with Amazing" by Scotty Granger	Scotty Granger (main); Nick Nittoli (team member); Melissa Rapp (team member); Sonyae Elise (team member)	The Songwriter (Granger) provided the hook for the winning song
3	June 13, 2011	"Going Where I Need to Be" by Johnny Marnell; Granger's hook 'Pack' did not qualify	Johnny Marnell (main); Brian Judah (team member); Scotty Granger (team member)	Granger was selected as the winner of the episode's Elimination Challenge
4	June 20, 2011	"Walk through Walls" by Johnny Marnell; Granger's hook "Boy I Wanna (Love You Down)" did not qualify	Johnny Marnell (main); Scotty Granger (team member); Jes Hudak (team member)	Granger was selected as the winner of the episode's Elimination Challenge
5	June 27, 2011	"Love Me to Life" by Sonyae Elise; Granger's hook "Love Me or Not" did not qualify	Sonyae Elise (main); Scotty Granger (team member); Brian Judah (team member)	Granger was selected as the winner of the episode's Elimination Challenge
6	July 8, 2011	"Say It Back" by Jackie Tohn; Granger's hook "Melt" did not qualify	Jackie Tohn (main); Scotty Granger (team member); Sonyae Elise (team member)	Granger was selected as one of the bottom two song entries in the Elimination Challenge and was up for elimination
7	July 15, 2011	"Love You Down" by Scotty Granger and Jes Hudak; Written for Justin Bieber	Scotty Granger (main); Jes Hudak (main)	The Songwriter Granger was one of the best song entries but was not selected as the winning song
8	July 22, 2011	"Reign" by Scotty Granger	Scotty Granger (main); Sonyae Elise (team member by choice); Nick Nittoli (team member by default)	Granger provided the hook for the winning song. Nittoli (in Granger's team) was singled out for having the best contribution and won a feature article spot in Spin magazine.
9	July 29, 2011	"DJ Have My Babies" by Scotty Granger; Won the hook challenge	Scotty Granger (solo – no teams allowed)	The Songwriter Granger was not selected as either a top entry or a bottom entry in the Elimination Challenge, and advanced to the next challenge (Final 3).
10; Finale	August 5, 2011	"Beautiful You" by Scotty Granger	Scotty Granger (solo – no teams allowed)	Granger finished 2nd runner-up. Contest won by Sonyae Elise and Jes Hudak as first runner-up

== After Platinum Hit ==
Scotty Granger continued his music career after finishing third in Platinum Hit taking the artistic name Scotty Grand. He released his album A Songwriter's Right in 2012 with an extended playlist under A Songwriter's Right - Paragraph One: Love Is... with the follow-up album A Songwriter's Right - Paragraph Two: Hate Will..., with notable collaboration with a number of artists and prominently with The Ben Leathers Orchestra. A Songwriter's Right - Paragraph Three is due in 2017 with a song a month released by Scotty Grand until date of release.

He worked as keyboard player and backing vocals for Jordin Sparks and eventually was assigned as a creative director for her in 2014. In 2015, he released his own single "If This Ain't Love" featuring The Ben Leathers Orchestra, and accompanied by a music video.

== Personal life ==
He is the younger brother of former NBA basketball player Danny Granger and great nephew of gospel singer Mahalia Jackson. Scotty is an openly gay artist.

== Discography ==
=== Albums ===
as Scotty Granger

- Revelations of Music [Jam Tight Records]
- So Natural [Poetik Arkhitekture Inc.] (2004)

as Scotty Grand

Title and details	Notes
A Songwriter's Right: Type: Album; Released: 2012; Record label:	No. / Title / Length; 1. / "If This Ain't Love" (feat. The Ben Leathers Orchestra) / 4:13; 2. / "Lay Wit U" / 3:42; 3. / "2 Days" / 5:27; 4. / "No Sun Like Saturday" / 4:19; 5. / "Holla (San Remix)" / 4:18; 6. / "Where We Belong" / 3:08; 7. / "Love is..." / 3:06; 8. / "Neverland [Tim McGraw Rough 3]" / 4:04
A Songwriter's Right - Paragraph One: Love Is...: Type: Album (extended version of A Songwriter's Right; Released: 2012; Record label:	No. / Title / Length; 1. / "Once upon a lie..." / 2:10; 2. / "No Sun Like Saturday" / 4:23; 3. / "If This Ain't Love" (feat. The Ben Leathers Orchestra) / 4:13; 4. / "Sofa" / 4:48; 5. / "The Makings of "Where We Belong"" / 2:10; 6. / "Where We Belong" / 3:08; 7. / "Holla (San Remix)" / 4:18; 8. / "The Makings of "Mr. Patron"" / 5:26; 9. / "...a few more days." / 1:15; 10. / "Love is..." / 3:05; 11. / "The Makings of "Familiar"" / 3:05; 12. / "hard." / 0:33; 13. / "With" / 3:14; 14. / "Neverland" [Tim McGraw Rough 3]" / 4:10; 15. / "But..." / 1:12; 16. / "2 Days" / 5:30
A Songwriter's Right - Paragraph Two: Hate Will...: Type: Album; Released: 2016; Record label:	No. / Title / Length; 1. / "Hollyweird, Ca" / 2:18; 2. / "You Got Me" / 3:00; 3. / "Disasterpiece" / 3:09; 4. / "Cry Me Clean" / 2:56; 5. / "Hate Will..." / 0:17; 6. / "The Makings of Liar of My Life" / 1:39; 7. / "Liar of My Life" (feat. The Ben Leathers Orchestra) / 3:45; 8. / "The Run-On" / 4:07; 9. / "Devour." / 3:11; 10. / "The Making of Goes Wrong, Pt. 1" / 2:33; 11. / "Saved by My Gift..." / 1:18; 12. / "The Makings of Here in Exile" / 4:56; 13. / "Delinquent" / 2:22; 14. / "Adele" / 1:33; 15. / "Stubborn Fool" / 4:31; 16. / "I Am the Music (Sunshine Remix)" (with Roy Gates) / 6:02; 17. / "Too Fast Too Hard" / 3:23; 18. / "Watch Me" (feat. Roger Pemberton) / 3:06; 19. / "Never Leave" / 3:31; 20. / "...And Friends." / 4:55; 21. / "Should We Try" / 2:48; 22. / "The Makings of Goes Wrong, Pt. 2" / 1:22; 23. / "Why Does It Hurt So Bad" (feat. The Ben Leathers Orchestra) / 4:22; 24. / "Rhinestones vs. Diamonds" / 4:04; 25. / "Gone" (with Brian Judah) / 3:40

=== Singles ===
as Scotty Granger

- 2011: "Beautiful You" (as Scotty Granger during Platinum Hit)

as Scotty Grand

- 2013: "If This Ain't Love" (featuring The Ben Leathers Orchestra) [When Words Fail Records]
- 2014: "Where We Belong" [When Words Fail Records]

2021: “All I Know”(The Wonder Years Theme Song” ABC [Hollywood Records]

== Videography ==
- 2015; "If This Ain't Love"
