= Malibu (album) =

Studio album by Anderson .Paak
- Released: January 15, 2016
- Studios: BrightLy (Raleigh); The Cadillac Castle (Van Nuys)
- Genres: R&B; hip-hop; neo soul
- Length: 61:02
- Labels: ArtClub; Steel Wool; OBE; Empire
- Producers: 9th Wonder; Anderson .Paak; Callum Connor; Chris Dave and the Drumhedz; Dem Jointz; DJ Khalil; Hi-Tek; Jose Rios; Kaytranada; Like; Madlib; Pomo; Vicky Nguyen

Anderson .Paak chronology
Venice (2014)	Malibu (2016)	Oxnard (2018)

Singles from Malibu
- 1. "The Season / Carry Me" Released: November 8, 2015; 2. "Am I Wrong" Released: November 9, 2015; 3. "Room in Here" Released: December 9, 2015; 4. "Come Down" Released: January 9, 2016

Malibu is the second studio album by American singer Anderson .Paak. It was released on January 15, 2016, by ArtClub International, Empire Distribution, OBE and Steel Wool Records following the release of his EP, Link Up & Suede, with Knxwledge (credited as the duo, NxWorries).

Malibu was supported by four singles: "The Season / Carry Me", "Am I Wrong", "Room in Here" and "Come Down". The album received widespread critical acclaim, placing highly on several music critics' end-of-year lists. It received a Grammy nomination for Best Urban Contemporary Album.

== Background ==
The album is described as the beginning of his potential commercial breakthrough, following his prominent role on Dr. Dre's album Compton (2015). Paak is featured on six songs on Compton, including "Animals". The track was produced by DJ Premier. Although, the track was initially slated for his 2016 album, Malibu. Dr. Dre later approved to have the track featured on his album Compton.

== Promotion ==
The album's lead single, "The Season / Carry Me", was released on November 8, 2015. The album's second single, "Am I Wrong", was released on November 9, 2015, the song features a guest appearance from American rapper Schoolboy Q. The album's third single, "Room in Here", was released on December 9, 2015, the song features guest appearances from American rapper The Game and American singer Sonyae Elise.

The album's fourth single, "Come Down", was released on January 9, 2016, the song was listed as the 44th best song of 2016 by Pitchfork.

== Critical reception ==
Professional ratings
Aggregate scores
Source	Rating
AnyDecentMusic?	8.0/10
Metacritic	85/100
Review scores
Source	Rating
AllMusic	5/5 stars
The Austin Chronicle	4.5/5 stars
Consequence	A−
Entertainment Weekly	B+
The Irish Times	4/5 stars
Pitchfork	8.6/10
Q	4/5 stars
Rolling Stone	3/5 stars
Spin	7/10
Vice	A−

Malibu was met with widespread critical acclaim. At Metacritic, which assigns a normalized rating out of 100 to reviews from professional publications, the album received an average score of 85, based on 18 reviews. Aggregator AnyDecentMusic? gave it 8.0 out of 10, based on their assessment of the critical consensus.

Andy Kellman of AllMusic said, "Compared to the impressive and occasionally brilliant Venice, this album's mix of high and hard times has deeper resonance". Alejandra Ramirez of The Austin Chronicle said, "There's effortless, unhurried groove as he slides from the disarming grit of Nineties hip-hop in "Without You" to Sixties soul on "The Bird" and honey-dripped R&B with "Am I Wrong"". Michael Madden of Consequence said, "For its lyrical and musical scope, Malibu brings to mind a number of excellent albums, ranging from Stevie Wonder's Innervisions to, yes, Kendrick Lamar's To Pimp a Butterfly". Kyle Anderson's review for Entertainment Weekly states that "Malibu defies categorization", attributing that to .Paak's "versatility and his willingness to take detours, not all of which work". Anderson calls "Silicon Valley" "well-meaning but dopey", but praises "Am I Wrong" as "the best Outkast song since that pair folded".

Erin Lowers of Exclaim! said, "A rose from concrete, Malibu offers a sense of wonder that's carefully rooted in funk and soul, and presents a complete vision from a blossoming new artist that's not only fearless, but leading something of a sonic revolution". Jon Caramanica of The New York Times said, "Malibu—his second album under this moniker, following a stretch under the name Breezy Lovejoy—is multilayered. It's also incisive, languorous and deeply felt, a warm bath of studiously relaxed hip-hop and soul". Dami Solebo of PopMatters said, "The reason for this broad interest is his ability to aptly infuse various musical styles under the R&B umbrella. Moreover, his ability to make uptempo soul without losing his ability to invoke a response more typical of downtempo sounds is particularly impressive". Steve Yates of Q magazine stated, "On the rich and dazzling Malibu, Anderson .Paak has truly found his voice".

Pitchfork's Marcus J. Moore awarded the album with a Best New Music rating, drawing comparisons between Paak and Kendrick Lamar, writing that "much like Kendrick Lamar, .Paak skillfully depicts his surroundings while remaining in the foreground" and that ".Paak's quicksilver flow on "Your Prime" feels teleported in directly from To Pimp a Butterfly as the music flows expansively from creamy soul harmonies to trap cadences". Sheldon Pearce of Spin said, "The tonal palette is warm and lush, with a transporting quality that's twofold, sending the listener both to the artist's western locale and back in time". The Wall Street Journal calls it an improvement on his previous album Venice, stating "on the new disc, Paak combines his varied interests into something familiar yet distinctive, bringing old-school R&B into the moment with his voice..." Christopher M. Weingarten of Rolling Stone said, "The music isn't always as dynamic as his thoughts, opting for a mostly mellow mood that matches the LP's carefree samples of surfing documentaries, but doesn't always capture their freewheeling individuality".

=== Year-end lists ===
Select year-end rankings of Malibu
Publication	List	Rank	Ref.
Complex	The 50 Best Albums of 2016	14	
Consequence	Top 50 Albums of 2016	8	
The Guardian	The Best Albums of 2016	22	
The Independent	Best Albums of 2016	2	
NME	NME's Albums of the Year 2016	21	
Paste	The 50 Best Albums of 2016	16	
Pitchfork	The 50 Best Albums of 2016	13	
The Skinny	Top 50 Albums of 2016	4	
Spin	The 50 Best Albums of 2016	24	
Stereogum	The 50 Best Albums of 2016	12	

=== Industry awards ===
Awards and nominations for Malibu
Year	Ceremony	Category	Result	Ref.
2017	Grammy Awards	Best Urban Contemporary Album	Nominated	

== Track listing ==
Malibu track listing
No.	Title	Writer(s)	Producer(s)	Length
1.	"The Bird"	Brandon Anderson; Ron Avant; Shafiq Husayn	Anderson .Paak	3:37
2.	"Heart Don't Stand a Chance"	Anderson; Khalil Abdul-Rahman; Sam Barsh; Daniel Seeff	DJ Khalil	5:12
3.	"The Waters" (featuring BJ the Chicago Kid)	Anderson; Otis Jackson Jr.; Byran Sledge	Madlib	2:54
4.	"The Season / Carry Me"	Anderson; Patrick Douthit; Matthew Merisola; Bill Withers	9th Wonder; Callum Connor	5:28
5.	"Put Me Thru"	Anderson	.Paak	2:40
6.	"Am I Wrong" (featuring Schoolboy Q)	Anderson; David Pimentel; Ivan Rosenberg	Pomo	4:13
7.	"Without You" (featuring Rapsody)	Anderson; Marlanna Evans; Douthit; Naomi Saalfield; Paul Bender; Simon Mavin; Perrin Moss	9th Wonder	3:19
8.	"Parking Lot"	Anderson; Jose Rios; Vicky Nguyen	.Paak; Rios	3:54
9.	"Lite Weight" (featuring the Free Nationals United Fellowship Choir)	Anderson; Kevin Celestin	Kaytranada	3:26
10.	"Room in Here" (featuring the Game and Sonyae Elise)	Anderson; Gabriel Stevenson; Haven Gillespie; Wayne King; Egbert Van Alstyne; Victor Young	Like	3:59
11.	"Water Fall (Interluuube)"	Anderson; Chris Dave; Robert Glasper	Chris Dave and the Drumhedz	1:58
12.	"Your Prime"	Anderson; Abdul-Rahman; Barsh; Seeff	DJ Khalil	3:57
13.	"Come Down"	Anderson; Tony Cottrell	Hi-Tek	2:56
14.	"Silicon Valley"	Anderson; Dwayne Abernathy, Jr.; Kelsey Gonzalez	Dem Jointz	4:04
15.	"Celebrate"	Anderson; Nguyen	.Paak; Nguyen	3:46
16.	"The Dreamer" (featuring Talib Kweli and Timan Family Choir)	Anderson; Talib Greene; Merisola; Harry Palmer	Callum Connor	5:39
Total length:				61:02

Sample credits

- "Without You" contains a sample of "Molasses", performed by Hiatus Kaiyote, written by Naomi Saalfield, Paul Bender, Simon Mavin and Perrin Moss.
- "Come Down" contains a sample of the Israeli national anthem, "Hatikvah".

== Personnel ==
Album credits adapted from Malibu digital booklet.

- Anderson .Paak – lead artist, production (tracks 1, 5, 8, 15), drums (tracks 2, 12), background vocals (tracks 2, 9, 12)
- BJ the Chicago Kid – feature vocal (track 3)
- Schoolboy Q – feature vocal (track 6)
- Rapsody – feature vocal (track 7)
- The Free Nationals United Fellowship Choir – featured artist (track 9)
- The Game – feature vocal (track 10)
- Sonyae Elise – feature vocal (track 10)
- Talib Kweli – featured artist (track 16)
- Timan Family Choir – featured artist (track 16)
- DJ Khalil – production (tracks 2, 12)
- Madlib – production (track 3)
- 9th Wonder – production (tracks 4, 7)
- Matthew "Callum Connor" Merisola – production (tracks 4, 16), mixing (track 16)
- Pomo – production (track 6)
- Jose Rios – production (track 8), guitar (tracks 1, 5, 8, 15)
- Kaytranada – production (track 9)
- Like – production (track 10)
- Chris Dave and the Drumhedz – production (track 11)
- Hi-Tek – production (track 13), mixing (track 13)
- Dem Jointz – production (track 14), mixing (track 14), recording (track 14)
- Vicky Farewell Nguyen – production (track 15), keys (tracks 8, 15), background vocals (track 9)
- Ron Avant – piano (tracks 1, 8, 15), vocoder (track 11)
- Kelsey Gonzalez – bass (tracks 1, 5, 8, 15), background vocals (track 9), guitar (track 14)
- Julian Le – strings (tracks 1, 5)
- Sam Barsh – keyboards (tracks 2, 12)
- Daniel Seeff – bass and guitar (tracks 2, 12)
- Emile Martinez – trumpet (track 1)
- Brasstracks – horns (track 6)
- Ann One – background vocals (track 9)
- Robert Glasper – keys (track 11)
- Pino Palladino – bass (track 11)
- Isaiah Sharkey – guitar (track 11)
- Olivia Braga – background vocals (track 12)
- Cameron Brown – guitar (track 13)
- Brian Cockerham – bass (track 13)
- Paris Timan – background vocals (track 16)
- Milan Timan – background vocals (track 16)
- Deja Timan – background vocals (track 16)
- Marlon Bills – background vocals (track 16)
- Ronald Timan – background vocals (track 16)
- Adrian L. Miller – executive producer
- Ketrina "Taz" Askew – executive producer
- Kevin Morrow – executive producer
- Chris Plata – mixing
- Jared Hirshland – mastering
- Erik Ian – photography
- Dewey Saunders – artwork
- Cory Gomberg – creative direction

== Charts ==
=== Weekly charts ===
Chart performance for Malibu
Chart (2016–2017)	Peak position
Australian Albums (ARIA)	85
Belgian Albums (Ultratop Flanders)	22
Belgian Albums (Ultratop Wallonia)	153
Canadian Albums (Billboard)	88
Dutch Albums (Album Top 100)	18
French Albums (SNEP)	92
New Zealand Albums (RMNZ)	39
Swiss Albums (Schweizer Hitparade)	33
US Billboard 200	79
US Independent Albums (Billboard)	6
US Top R&B/Hip-Hop Albums (Billboard)	9

=== Year-end charts ===
2016 year-end chart performance for Malibu
Chart (2016)	Position
Belgian Albums (Ultratop Flanders)	124
Dutch Albums (MegaCharts)	91
US Top R&B/Hip-Hop Albums (Billboard)	60

== Certifications ==
Certifications for Malibu
Region	Certification	Certified units/sales
Denmark (IFPI Danmark)	Gold	10,000^{‡}
United Kingdom (BPI)	Gold	100,000^{‡}
United States (RIAA)	Gold	500,000^{‡}
^{‡} Sales+streaming figures based on certification alone.
