= Birthday (K. Michelle song) =

Single by K. Michelle

from the album Kimberly: The People I Used to Know
- Released: September 8, 2017
- Recorded: 2017
- Genre: R&B; soul
- Length: 4:01
- Label: Atlantic Records
- Songwriters: Pate, Ward, Nowee, Samuels, Sonyae Elise

K.Michelle singles chronology
"If It Ain't Me" (2017)	"Birthday" (2017)	"Either Way" (2017)

"Birthday" is a song by American R&B singer K. Michelle, for her fourth studio album "Kimberly: The People I Used to Know" (2017). The song was released on September 8, 2017, through Atlantic Records.

== Background and release ==
Speaking on the track Michelle stated in an interview with Billboard magazine "Birthday is just the fun song going out, but I can honestly say this is my best vocal album and you will get those in ballads like "Brain On Love" and "No Not You". That speaks to who I am and the person and the woman that I’ve become. So I just say it's a little piece on this roller coaster journey that the album takes you in."

== Critical reception ==
The song gained positive reviews from critics. HotNewHipHop gave the track a positive review rating it a 3.7 out of 5 stars stating "Heavy enough for the club but slow enough for the bedroom, "Birthday" starts out as an aqueous R&B track akin to Rihanna's "Needed Me." However, K has some tricks up her sleeve; intensifying her vocal delivery as the song progresses, moving from a cooed approach to a more rhythmic, but still half-sung second verse." Vibe praised the song stating "The song, which is the second single from the forthcoming Kimberly: The People I Used to Know, is perfect for both the club scene and the bedroom, as K. provides smooth, sultry vocals that later transition into a rap that brings major vibes." Rap-Up stated "On the seductive “Birthday,” the Memphis songstress caters to her man. After rolling an L and pouring a drink, K gets right. “Come on eat this cake, it’s your birthday,”".

== Music video ==
"Birthday" was directed by Art by Child in, October 25, 2017.

== Formats and track listings ==
- Explicit digital download
1. "Birthday" – 4:01
- Clean digital download
1. "Birthday" – 4:01

== Release history ==
Country	Date	Format	Version	Label	Ref.
United States	September 8, 2017	Digital download	Clean; Explicit	Atlantic Records	
United Kingdom	September 8, 2017	Digital download	Explicit	Atlantic Records	
France	September 8, 2017	Digital download	Explicit	Atlantic Records	
