= Platinum Weird =

British/American Band

- Origin: United Kingdom / United States
- Genres: Pop rock, soft rock
- Years active: 2004–2006
- Labels: Interscope; Rocket
- Members: Kara DioGuardi; David A. Stewart
- Past members: Noel Chambers; Erin Grace; Brian Parfitt; Matthew Sugarman (all fictitious)
- Website: http://www.platinumweird.com

Platinum Weird is a musical collaboration formed in 2004 between Dave Stewart and Kara DioGuardi. It is also the subject of an elaborate hoax placing the band in 1974, including a half-hour mockumentary produced for television network VH1 and a series of bogus World Wide Web fan sites and related false documents for the 'lost' group.

== Origin ==
In a 2005 interview, DioGuardi explained that she and Stewart were asked to write songs for the Pussycat Dolls in 2004. Instead, the pair ended up with material that DioGuardi described as resembling Fleetwood Mac. Although the collaboration did not produce the intended Pussycat Dolls songs, Interscope chairman Jimmy Iovine encouraged the continuation of the project, and longtime DioGuardi partner John Shanks was brought in for album production duties. Stewart confirmed the collaboration in a separate interview. In March 2005, it was reported that they would release an album entitled Avalanche that year. MP3 versions of the tracks "Avalanche" and "Happiness" were made available via Myspace.

== Back-story ==
Believing that the unusual combination of an older, well-known artist and a relatively unknown, though highly successful, writer for much younger performers might not be accepted by the public, they adopted an elaborate back-story conceived by Iovine.

In a November 2005 Rolling Stone interview, Stewart started to plant the new story about the group's origin, stating that he conceived of the project in 1973. At that time he also disclosed that the project would be accompanied by a short film. This followed a message posted by Catherine Schwartz on her website that she was working on two Platinum Weird projects, a video for "Happiness" and what she described as a mockumentary set in the 1970s.

Video clips showing Mick Jagger, Adam Levine, Ringo Starr, Paris Hilton, Christina Aguilera, Lindsay Lohan, Stevie Nicks and others recalling the band were distributed, along with audio tracks said to have come from 1974.

The fictional version of Platinum Weird is a partnership between Stewart and a mythical singer/songwriter from New York City named Erin Grace. Erin made a strong impression on numerous artists in the UK, including Stevie Nicks, who emulated her style. After a handful of performances and with an album partially completed, Erin suddenly disappeared. Apparently distraught over the death of Nick Drake, she abruptly ran off with Elton John's boyfriend in late 1974. Soon afterward, she turned up in Los Angeles, where Don Henley introduced her to Lindsey Buckingham, setting into motion a relationship that would be the inspiration for the Fleetwood Mac Rumours album.

Years later, a young DioGuardi would meet a neighbor in New York, an older hippie woman who became a mentor in her songwriting efforts. In her 2004 meeting with Stewart, DioGuardi found that she already knew the words to an old Platinum Weird song, "Will You Be Around", that he was playing on his guitar. She had learned the song from her old neighbor, evidently the lost Erin.

In July 2006, VH1 premiered a mockumentary entitled Rock Legends – Platinum Weird, an examination of the band's unusual story, complete with cameo appearances from such rock legends as Mick Jagger, Annie Lennox, Elton John, and Ringo Starr, all reminiscing about the former band's short-lived heyday and their impressions of the mysterious Erin Grace. On 5 July 2006, the day Rock Legends: Platinum Weird was shown on VH1, Platinum Weird admitted to the hoax in a Los Angeles Times interview. Stewart did note that the film was "80% true", with real biographical information mixed into the back-story. In an August 2006 interview, Stewart explained that he did meet a New Yorker in Amsterdam in the 1970s and did write some songs during their brief relationship. She was not, however, the Erin Grace portrayed in the film.

== Pre-release tracks ==
The tracks distributed from platinumweird.com and fan websites include "Happiness", "This Guitar", "Lonely Eyes", "If You Believe" and "Picture Perfect New", and also an interview said to be taped in 1974. This version of "Happiness" is quieter than the earlier Myspace version, sung in a lower register.

"This Guitar (Can't Keep from Crying)" originally appeared on George Harrison's 1975 album Extra Texture (Read All About It). The Platinum Weird release is an alternate recording, also featuring Harrison on lead vocals. One report states that this track was originally recorded in 1992, and completed with 2006 contributions from Stewart, Dhani Harrison, Starr and Mark Hudson. Although it did not appear on Platinum Weird's album Make Believe, this version of "This Guitar" was included as a bonus track on the 2014 reissue of Extra Texture.

== Film and live debut ==
The real Platinum Weird performed at the Recording Academy Honors show on 8 June 2006. This was followed by a 12 June 2006 screening of the film Rock Legends: Platinum Weird in New York, described in Billboard magazine as "a documentary film (sort of) about a band by that name". Another report notes that Stewart treated the film seriously, "insisting the group really did exist." The film, created by Tomorrow's Brightest Minds/Oil Factory and narrated by Dan Aykroyd (himself an alumnus of the semi-fictional Blues Brothers), does not credit the actors who played Erin, young Dave, or drummer Brian Parfitt, but Dave was played by his own son, Sam.

== Releases ==
A Platinum Weird EP entitled Will You Be Around was released to iTunes on 4 July 2006. In addition to the title track, it includes "Picture Perfect" and "Lonely Eyes". All three were written by Stewart and DioGuardi.

The group's first album, Make Believe, was released on 10 October 2006 – a set of ten previously unreleased recordings "from 1974". Best Buy stores in America exclusively carried a 2-disc edition of Make Believe featuring the standard 10-track "1974" album, and a bonus disc of the 12 2005–2006 recordings. The 2005 album was also released on its own as a promotional CD.

== Discography ==
- Make Believe (2006)
- Platinum Weird (2006; only released commercially with the Best Buy edition of Make Believe)

== See also ==
- Chris Gaines
- The Dukes of Stratosphear
- Spinal Tap
- The Rutles
