= Melissa Rapp =

Singer-songwriter

- Born: Melissa Catherine Rapp; July 15, 1978 (age 48); Honolulu, Hawaii, U.S.
- Origin: Honolulu, Hawaii, US
- Genres: Indie pop, Pop soul, Indie folk
- Occupation: Singer-songwriter · attorney
- Instruments: Vocals, guitar, piano, guitarlele
- Label: Independent
- Website: Official website Spotify; YouTube

Melissa Catherine Rapp (born 15 July 1978) is a Los Angeles–based singer-songwriter. She was born and raised in Honolulu, Hawaii, and is a featured cast member of Bravo's first season of the songwriting competition show Platinum Hit. Her music is a blend of pop, soul, and folk. In 2020, Rapp graduated from the UCLA School of Law.

== Biography ==
Rapp is from an educated and musical family. Rapp's great grandfather was a professional drummer on Mississippi river boats. Her grandfather, Roy T. Rapp, put himself through medical school by playing the trumpet in Chicago big bands.

Rapp took up piano at age five, training privately in Honolulu. She started playing guitar at age 15. She graduated with honors from Punahou School, the same high school attended by President Barack Obama. She went on to graduate from Stanford University with a degree in History. While at Stanford, she was a member of the Harmonics, a co-ed a cappella group, as well as a member of the collegiate alpine ski racing and triathlon teams.

== Musical career ==
Rapp first performance of her original music was at the Stanford Coffeehouse. She started playing professionally in San Francisco immediately following her college graduation. Since that time, she has toured the United States, sharing stages with artists such as Sara Bareilles, Chuck Prophet, Josh Ritter, and ALO.

In 2008, she recorded the album The Other Side in Berkeley, California. The album was produced by Jon Evans and features drumming by Allison Miller and keyboards by Julie Wolf. The album received radio play on San Francisco radio stations KFOG 104.5 and KUSF.

In 2010, she recorded her second album Just Like That in Los Angeles and San Francisco. The record featured a cast of musicians including drummer Jimmy Paxson, bassist Michael Valerio, Julie Wolf and guitarists Ray Bergstrom and Betsy Adams and garnered press coverage.

In 2019, she released a series of singles produced by Australian producers/songwriters Clare Reynolds and Jordie Lane. The tracks feature Jimmy Paxson (drums), Jonathan Flaugher (bass), and Will Gramling (keys) with mixing by Jordan Lehning in Nashville.

She appeared on a Today show segment with Paul Ehrlich and was one of the participants of Platinum Hit on Bravo (2011).

== Discography ==
- 2008: The Other Side (Self-released – CD, music download and streaming)
- 2010: Just Like That (Self-released – CD, music download and streaming)
- 2013: To Memi Lou (Self-released – music download)
- 2018: Take the Blame (Single – streaming)
- 2019: Maybe Together (Single – streaming)
- 2019: Whole World (Single – streaming)
- 2019: Lockdown (Single – streaming)
- 2019: Sweet Lullabies (Single – streaming)
