= Kara DioGuardi =

American songwriter (born 1970)

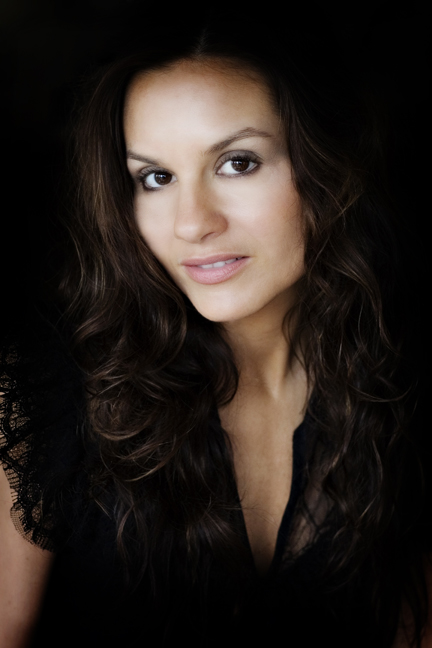
- DioGuardi in 2007

Background information
- Born: Kara Elizabeth DioGuardi; December 9, 1970 (age 55); Ossining, New York, U.S.
- Genres: Pop; pop rock; country
- Occupations: Record executive; songwriter; record producer; music publisher; singer; television personality
- Years active: 1990–present
- Labels: Interscope; Rocket; Warner Bros.
- Member of: Platinum Weird
- Spouse: Mike McCuddy (m. 2009)
- Website: karadioguardi.com

Kara Elizabeth DioGuardi (/ˈkærə ˌdiːoʊˈɡwɑːrdi/ KARR-ə DEE-oh-GWAR-dee; born December 9, 1970) is an American songwriter, record producer, music publisher, A&R executive, and singer. She primarily writes music in the pop rock genre. She has worked with many popular artists; sales of albums on which her songs appear exceed 160 million worldwide. DioGuardi is a 2011 NAMM Music for Life Award winner, 2009 NMPA Songwriter Icon Award winner, 2007 BMI Pop Songwriter of the Year, and has received 20 BMI Awards for co-writing songs.

DioGuardi was a judge on American Idol for its eighth and ninth seasons. In 2008, she was appointed to the position of executive vice president of talent development at Warner Bros. Records; she has signed acts such as Jason Derulo and Iyaz. In 2011, she was a head judge on the Bravo singer-songwriter competition series Platinum Hit.

== Early life and education ==
DioGuardi was born in Ossining, New York. Her father is former Republican Congressman and 2010 US Senate candidate Joe DioGuardi; her grandfather was Albanian. Her mother Carol died in 1997 after a seven-year battle with ovarian cancer.

DioGuardi grew up in the Wilmot Woods section of suburban New Rochelle, New York and attended elementary school at the Immaculate Heart of Mary Catholic School in Scarsdale, New York. She graduated from The Masters School in Dobbs Ferry, New York and earned a degree in political science at Duke University. After graduating from college, she worked for Billboard magazine as an assistant to Timothy White and Howard Lander; later she was an advertising sales representative there.

== Career ==
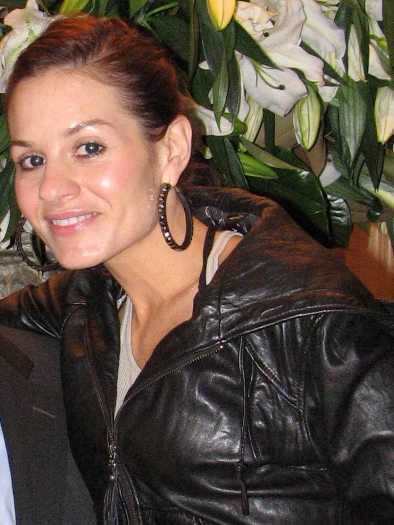
DioGuardi in 2010

=== Professional songwriting ===
DioGuardi has a songwriting catalog of more than 320 songs released by major labels, 150 of which landed on RIAA Platinum albums, and more than 50 charting singles. Her songs have helped propel more than 66 albums into the top 10 of the Billboard 200. Her songs have been featured in major motion pictures, television shows, film soundtracks, and radio spots, as well as in national and international commercial campaigns.

She wrote with Ashlee Simpson for Simpson's first and second albums, in 2003 and 2004. She collaborated with Thalía in 2003 for her self-titled album Thalía. In 2004, DioGuardi co-wrote one-sixth of the tracks off Kelly Clarkson's sophomore album Breakaway including Clarkson's hit "Walk Away". DioGuardi then worked with Australian singer, Ricki-Lee Coulter on her 2005 single Sunshine from her debut studio album, Ricki-Lee, which was released in October of the same year.

She also worked with Christina Aguilera on her album Back to Basics in 2006, co-writing twelve of the thirteen tracks on disc one of the album, among them being "Ain't No Other Man" and "Back in the Day". In the same year, she collaborated with Jesse McCartney on his album Right Where You Want Me, co-writing four songs called "Anybody", "Invincible", "Running Away", and "Feels Like Sunday".

In 2007, DioGuardi worked with many notable artists, one of whom was Britney Spears. DioGuardi wrote and produced "Ooh Ooh Baby" and co-produced "Heaven on Earth" on Spears' album Blackout. DioGuardi also contributed a majority of the songs on Hilary Duff's fourth studio album, Dignity. Since American Idol Season 8, DioGuardi returned to songwriting and producing, and has worked with number of artists, including Pink's "Sober," Kelly Clarkson's "I Do Not Hook Up," Melanie Martinez's "Pity Party" and "Cake," Cobra Starship's "Good Girls Go Bad," Katharine McPhee's "Had It All", Carrie Underwood's "Undo It", and Theory of a Deadman's "Not Meant to Be" among other releases.

Among DioGuardi's projects is the song "Not Meant to Be", which appears on Theory of a Deadman's 2008 album, Scars & Souvenirs. She co-wrote the song with lead singer Tyler Connolly, and is also featured as the love interest in the music video which was released on March 10, 2009. The song was her debut in the music video industry.

In 2007, a song DioGuardi and Eurythmics member Dave Stewart had written a year ago "Taking Chances" was recorded by Celine Dion and released as the first single from the album Taking Chances in September 2007. (DioGuardi and Stewart had previously collaborated under the band name "Platinum Weird".) The song was a success around the world reaching the top ten in Belgium, Canada, Denmark, France, Italy and Switzerland. It also peaked at number 40 on the UK Singles Chart, while reaching number 54 on the Billboard Hot 100 chart.

In 2009, DioGuardi wrote "If I Can't Have You" for Meat Loaf's 2010 album Hang Cool Teddy Bear and recorded the vocal as a duet with him. She is also one of the writers for "Ghost", which was released as a single from Fefe Dobson's album Joy (2010). She wrote songs for Aussie singer Natalie Imbruglia's third studio album Counting Down the Days. After taking a break from writing, DioGuardi was one of the writers of Kelly Clarkson's "Heartbeat Song" which was the first single from Clarkson's seventh studio album Piece by Piece (2015). DioGuardi also co-wrote "Rebel Hearts" for Hilary Duff's Breathe In Breathe Out album in 2015.

=== Songs for film and television ===
DioGuardi has also written for films and television series. She wrote "Halo" for One Tree Hill, "Brand New Day" for Camp Rock 2: The Final Jam, "We Rock" and "Play My Music" for Camp Rock, "He Could Be the One" for Hannah Montana, "Set This Party Off" for Jonas, and "Someone Watching over Me" for Raise Your Voice. She has written songs which have been used as themes including "Taking Chances" on Glee, "Come Clean" on Laguna Beach: The Real Orange County, "Autobiography" on The Ashlee Simpson Show.

=== Music publishing ===
DioGuardi co-owns Arthouse Entertainment, a publishing company which is a resource business for record companies and other music entities seeking compositions, productions, artists, and related music services. Arthouse has been a part of many chart-topping hits including B.O.B's "Nothin' On You"; Bruno Mars' "Just The Way You Are" and "Grenade"; Cee-Lo Green's "Forget You", Flo Rida's "Club Can't Handle Me", Demi Lovato's "Heart Attack"; Jason DeRulo's "Want to Want Me" and "Trumpets"; Eminem's "Monster", Zedd's "Beautiful Now", Jon Bellion's "All Time Low", Maroon 5's "Memories", Illenium's "Good Things Fall Apart", Halsey's "Graveyard", Florida Georgia Line's "Simple", Ingrid Andress' "More Hearts Than Mine", and Gayle's "ABCDEFU."

=== Reality television ===
In July 2006, DioGuardi was a judge in an Idol-like TV show called The One: Making a Music Star. The show debuted on ABC with the second-lowest rating ever for a premiere on a major American network and was abruptly canceled after just two weeks.

In 2009, she joined the hit Fox television show American Idol as a fourth judge for the show's eighth season alongside judges Simon Cowell, Randy Jackson, and Paula Abdul. DioGuardi returned to Idol for its ninth season alongside Cowell, Jackson, and new judge Ellen DeGeneres who replaced Paula Abdul after she quit the show in contract disagreements. However, DioGuardi decided to leave the show on September 3, 2010 and did not return for the tenth season of Idol. It has since been said that DioGuardi helped Steven Tyler become a judge on American Idol, after they worked together at DioGuardi's house in Los Angeles. She has had Idol connections in the past: in 2000, DioGuardi and former Idol judge Paula Abdul co-wrote the UK number-one single "Spinning Around", performed by Kylie Minogue. DioGuardi has written many songs sung by Idol winners and alumni such as Kelly Clarkson, Allison Iraheta, David Archuleta, Carrie Underwood, Diana DeGarmo, Katharine McPhee, Kris Allen, Danny Gokey, and Adam Lambert. DioGuardi co-wrote the American Idol season eight coronation single "No Boundaries", which was performed by both finalists during the competition. DioGuardi struggled to find her place among the judges. In Richard Rushfield's book, "American Idol: The Untold Story," he reveals that often the other judges would leave the studio during commercial breaks, leaving DioGuardi behind to awkwardly sit by herself.

DioGuardi also co-wrote with Jason Reeves a song called "Terrified" for Katharine McPhee's album Unbroken, which was covered by Didi Benami, an American Idol contestant from Season 9, during Hollywood week. DioGuardi recorded a video of herself singing "Terrified" with Jason Reeves on YouTube, which has over 1,800,000 views. She appeared on Hannah Montana as herself in the episode "Judge Me Tender".

After leaving American Idol, she was a head judge on the Bravo singer-songwriter competition series Platinum Hit.

=== Other projects ===
DioGuardi guest starred as herself on The Simpsons and Sesame Street. From September 5 – October 30, 2011, she made her Broadway debut as Roxie Hart in Chicago. She released an autobiography after her departure from American Idol named A Helluva High Note; Surviving Life, Love and American Idol.

Since 2012, she has taught a semester course called "Hitmaking with Kara DioGuardi" at Berklee College of Music in Boston. The course was developed specifically for the fall 2012 curriculum; it has paired 27 student songwriters and producers to mirror today's music industry practices. One of her students was Charlie Puth.

In late 2017, DioGuardi helped launch the first effort in Maine of a national program working to prevent child sexual abuse, the Enough Abuse Campaign (EAC).

=== Awards and nominations ===
In 2003, DioGuardi won a BMI Cable Award for co-writing and performing "Somethin' To Say", the theme to the Lifetime Television series For the People, which starred Lea Thompson, Debbi Morgan, A. Martinez, and Cecilia Suárez. DioGuardi has been awarded 23 BMI Awards (including 2007 BMI Pop Songwriter of the Year) for having co-written the most performed songs on the radio. One of the industry's most highly sought after songwriters and producers, her songs have appeared on records which have sold more than 150 million copies combined. In 2007, she was nominated for a Latin Grammy in the category of Song of the Year for writing the Belinda single "Bella Traición" along with co-writers Belinda, Ben Moody, Nacho Peregrin and producer Mitch Allan. In November 2007, DioGuardi was awarded the TAXI A&R award for Humanitarian of the Year at the annual Road Rally Convention. She is also a recipient of the 2009 NMPA Songwriter Icon Award, the 2011 NAMM Music for Life Award, and Variety’s 2022 A&R Hitmaker award.

== Discography ==
=== As a vocalist ===
With MaD DoLL:

- Mad Doll (1999)

With Platinum Weird:

- Make Believe (2006)
- Platinum Weird (2006)

As a featured artist:

- "If I Can't Have You" on Meat Loaf's album "Hang Cool Teddy Bear" (2010)
- "The Sun Will Rise" on Kelly Clarkson's album Stronger (2011)

Music videos

- "Not Meant to Be" – Theory of a Deadman (2009)

== Personal life ==
DioGuardi began dating teacher-turned-general contractor Mike McCuddy in 2007 after the two met while he was working on a home adjacent to her property in Maine. After a year and a half of dating, DioGuardi and McCuddy got engaged in December 2008 and married on July 5, 2009, in Prospect Harbor, Maine. McCuddy has a teenage daughter from a previous relationship. Together, DioGuardi and McCuddy have one son, born via gestational carrier on January 31, 2013. The couple made the decision to use a surrogate after years of infertility and unsuccessful in vitro fertilization attempts.

DioGuardi works with the Phoenix House, a non-profit substance abuse service organization; she contributes to recording studios in the facilities and helps teach the teens how to operate the equipment. In February 2010, she joined former American Idol contestant Elliott Yamin in a charity trip sponsored by ExxonMobil to Angola where they visited malaria prevention and treatment projects as part of Idol Gives Back.

In May 2010, she posed nude for the annual "Naked Truth" issue of Allure magazine.

== Filmography ==
=== Television ===
Year	Title	Role	Notes
2006	Rock Legends: Platinum Weird	Herself	Television film
2006	The One: Making a Music Star	Herself	
2009–2010	American Idol	Herself / Judge	
2009	Hannah Montana	Herself	Episode: "Judge Me Tender"
2010	The Simpsons	Herself (voice)	Episode: "Judge Me Tender"
2011	Platinum Hit	Herself	

== Awards ==
=== Latin Grammy Awards ===
Year	Title of Work	Category	Result
2007	"Bella Traición"	Song of the Year	Nominated

== Published works ==
- DioGuardi, Kara (2011). A Helluva High Note: Surviving Life, Love, and American Idol. It Books. ISBN 978-0-06-205989-5.

== Sources ==
- Widran, Jonathan. "Kara DioGuardi Discusses How She Got Started, Her Hit Songs, And Songwriting". SongwriterUniverse Magazine.
- Reynolds, J.R. (March 2002). "On the Scene: Kara DioGuardi". BMI MusicWorld.
- Lee, Chris (December 25, 2005). "Spinning all that angst into pop gold. Lindsay. Hilary. Celine. Pink. Kara DioGuardi's first-person songs pushed them all up the charts. And now it's her turn to shout". Los Angeles Times. p. E1. Guest Co-host; (ABC Television) The View | October 15, 2009
