= Kimberly: The People I Used to Know =

Studio album by K. Michelle
- Released: December 8, 2017
- Recorded: 2016–2017
- Genre: R&B
- Length: 62:59
- Label: Atlantic

K. Michelle chronology
More Issues Than Vogue (2016)	Kimberly: The People I Used to Know (2017)	All Monsters Are Human (2020)

Singles from Kimberly: The People I Used to Know
- 1. "Birthday" Released: September 8, 2017; 2. "Either Way" Released: September 15, 2017; 3. "Make This Song Cry" Released: October 6, 2017; 4. "Crazy Like You" Released: February 13, 2018

Kimberly: The People I Used to Know is the fourth studio album by American singer-songwriter K. Michelle, released on December 8, 2017, through Atlantic Records. The album was preceded by the release of the singles "Birthday", "Either Way", "Make This Song Cry" and "Crazy Like You".

== Background and release ==
"It's a record that is very, very vibey. The direction of the album is actually, I actually am talking about a lot of people -- not bashing them, but speaking on some people who have been influential in my life, whether it was for the good or the bad."

— K. Michelle talking about her fourth studio album.

On December 21, 2016, K. Michelle announced that her fourth album would be released in 2017 via Twitter with an acronym "TCE". During the final season of her reality show "K. Michelle: My Life, the singer revealed a song titled "Heaven", calling the song "one of my most personal records on my new album". On September 8, 2017, in an interview with Billboard, the album's title was revealed "Kimberly: The People I Used to Know". On October 13, 2017, the album cover, track list and release date was revealed.

== Singles ==
"Birthday" was released as the album's lead single on September 8, 2017. "Either Way" featuring American singer Chris Brown was released as the album's second single on September 15, 2017. The song debuted at number 19 on the US Billboard R&B Digital Song Sales chart for the week beginning October 7, 2017. "Make This Song Cry" was released as the album's third single on October 6, 2017. "Crazy Like You" was released as the album's fourth single on August 12, 2018.

== Critical response ==
Professional ratings
Review scores
Source	Rating
AllMusic	4/5 stars
Newsday	3/4 stars
Pitchfork	7.0/10
Renowned for Sound	4/5 stars

On AllMusic, Andy Kellman gave the album four stars out of five, stating that "she has too much on her mind - and has such an imaginative and proficient way of getting it all out - to truly bail." Glenn Gamboa from Newsday wrote that "It’s a shoot-from-the-hip style given to hits and misses, but when K. Michelle connects, she hits hard."

Pitchfork's Alfred Soto graded it 7 points out of 10, commenting that "KIMBERLY: The People I Used to Know may lack a thumper like "V.S.O.P." or a slow jam as urgent as "Drake Would Love Me," still her greatest performance, but it continues a remarkable four-album streak." Rachael Scarsbrook of Renowned for Sound gave the album 4 stars out of 5, wrote that "There is enough differentiation to maintain intrigue even if the album is some 20+ tracks long. K Michelle is never one to mince her words, and she’s certainly not going to be changing that any time soon.

== Track listing ==
Kimberly: The People I Used to Know track listing
No.	Title	Writer(s)	Producer(s)	Length
1.	"Welcome to the People I Used to Know"	Kimberly Pate		0:32
2.	"Alert"	Pate; Darhyl Camper; Safaree Samuels	Camper	2:18
3.	"God, Love, Sex, and Drugs"	Uforo Ebong; Gabrielle Nowee; Virgil Jamal Buchanan	Bongo	3:52
4.	"Make This Song Cry"	Pate; Ronald Jackson; Jeremiah Bethea; Philip Cornish; Shawn Carter; Douglas Gibbs; Ralph Johnson	Lil' Ronnie	3:27
5.	"Crazy Like You"	Pate; Jackson; Bethea; Eric Crawford; Daniel Bryant; Deante Hitchcock	Ronnie; Bryant; Crawford^{[a]}	3:44
6.	"Kim K"	Pate; Camper; Micah Powell; Jordan Etterlane	Camper	2:33
7.	"Takes Two" (featuring Jeremih)	Goldie; Hitmaka; Jeremih; Drew Love; Robert Kelly	Bongo; Hitmaka	3:24
8.	"Rounds"	Charles Hinshaw; Ken Lewis; Brent Kolatalo; Willie Smith, Sr.	Katalyst; Bangallure^{[b]}	3:25
9.	"Either Way" (featuring Chris Brown)	Pate; Jackson; Bethea; Crawford; Bryant; Chris Brown; Odis Flores	Ronnie	4:14
10.	"Birthday"	Pate; Sonyae Elise; Hitmaka; Samuels; Nowee	Yung Ladd; Hitmaka; Critical^{[c]}	4:01
11.	"Fuck Your Man" (Interlude)	Pate; Jackson; Bethea; Crawford; Bryant	Ronnie	3:41
12.	"No Not You"	Pate; Jackson; Cornish; Bianca Atterberry	Ronnie	3:50
13.	"Giving Up on Love"	Alex Vickery; Midian Mathers	Louis Biancaniello	3:20
14.	"Help Me Grow" (Interlude)	Pate		0:28
15.	"Heaven"	Philip Constable; Lindsay Gilbert	Constable; Gilbert^{[a]}; Crawford^{[a]}	3:56
16.	"Run Don't Walk"	Claude Kelly; Charles Harmon; Akil King; Kyle Owens; Jaramye Daniels	A Louis York	3:48
17.	"Industry Suicide" (Interlude)	Pate		0:32
18.	"Talk to God"	Pate; Jackson; Bethea; Crawford; Bryant; Hinshaw; Courtney Dwight	Ronnie; BLAQSMURPH; Crawford^{[a]}	4:27
19.	"Brain on Love"	Kevin Kadish; Eric Hudson; Sam Sumser; Priscilla Renea	Eric Hudson	3:27
20.	"Woman of My Word"	Rodney Jerkins; David Nathan; Carmen Reece	Jerkins; Nathan; King Midas	2:53
21.	"Outro" (performed by Princess Nokia)	Pate		1:07
Total length:				62:59

Notes

- ^{^[a]} signifies a vocal producer
- ^{^[b]} signifies a co-producer
- ^{^[c]} signifies an additional producer

Sample credits

- "Make This Song Cry" contains elements of "Song Cry", written by Shawn Carter, Douglas Gibbs, Randolph Johnson and Justin Smith.

== Charts ==
Chart performance for Kimberly: The People I Used to Know
Chart (2017)	Peak position
US Billboard 200	56
US Top R&B/Hip-Hop Albums (Billboard)	23

== Release history ==
Release history for Kimberly: The People I Used to Know
Region	Date	Format	Label	Ref
United States	December 8, 2017	Digital download, CD	Atlantic	
Canada	December 8, 2017	Digital download, CD	Atlantic	
United Kingdom	December 10, 2017	Digital download, CD	Atlantic	
Spain	December 10, 2017	Digital download, CD	Atlantic	
France	December 10, 2017	Digital download, CD	Atlantic	
Germany	December 10, 2017	Digital download, CD	Atlantic	
