= Alison Pember =

Marketer and former journalist

Alison Pember is an American marketer and former music journalist.

== Career ==
Alison Pember interned with University of Washington radio station KCMU when she was 14 years old. During high school, she worked at different radio stations. This continued when she studied at Simon Fraser University in Canada and joined the university radio station, CJIV.

After university, Pember worked for Tower Records beginning in 1990, and as hip hop gained popularity she co-founded The Flavor, a Seattle-based hip hop magazine that ran between 1992 and 1996. The magazine was notable for having a mostly female staff, and had a peak circulation of 70,000. But after Pember left in 1996, the magazine closed.

Pember moved to New York to work for London Records and manage the US operations of Mo' Wax Records. She was promoted to Director of Marketing at London in 1997, and later VP of Marketing. More recently she held the role of Director of Branded Media & Entertainment at Microsoft.
