= Tints (song) =

2018 single by Anderson .Paak

Single by Anderson .Paak featuring Kendrick Lamar

from the album Oxnard
- Released: October 3, 2018
- Genre: R&B
- Length: 4:29
- Label: Aftermath
- Songwriters: Brandon Anderson; Sydney Bennett; Kendrick Duckworth; Jeff Gitelman; Om'Mas Keith; Rob Lewis; Taylor Parks; David Pimentel
- Producers: Brandon Anderson; Om'Mas Keith

Anderson .Paak singles chronology
"Bubblin" (2018)	"Tints" (2018)	"Who R U?" (2018)

Kendrick Lamar singles chronology
"Dedication" (2018)	"Tints" (2018)	"Hair Down" (2019)

Music video
- "Tints" on YouTube

"Tints" is a song performed by American rapper and singer Anderson .Paak; issued as the lead single from his third studio album Oxnard. The song is a duet rap with fellow American hip hop recording artist Kendrick Lamar; and it peaked at #9 on the Billboard Adult R&B chart in 2018.

"Tints" was certified gold by the Recording Industry Association of America on May 21, 2021. On December 1, 2018, Anderson .Paak and Kendrick Lamar performed the song on Saturday Night Live.

== Music video ==
The official music video for "Tints" was directed by Colin Tilley.

== Chart positions ==
Chart (2018–19)	Peak position
Billboard Japan Hot 100	99
US Adult R&B Airplay (Billboard)	9
US Bubbling Under Hot 100 (Billboard)	22

== Certifications ==
Certifications and sales for "Tints"
Region	Certification	Certified units/sales
New Zealand (RMNZ)	Gold	15,000^{‡}
United States (RIAA)	Gold	500,000^{‡}
^{‡} Sales+streaming figures based on certification alone.
