= Bubblin (song) =

2018 song by Anderson .Paak

Single by Anderson .Paak
- Released: May 17, 2018
- Genre: Hip hop
- Length: 3:29
- Label: Aftermath
- Songwriters: Brandon Anderson; Orlando Tucker; Dwayne Abernathy Jr.; Anthony Markeith Reid
- Producers: Jahlil Beats; Antman Wonder

Anderson .Paak singles chronology
| "'Til It's Over" (2018) | "Bubblin" (2018) | "Tints" (2018) |

Music video
- "Bubblin" on YouTube

"Bubblin" is a song written and performed by American rapper and singer Anderson .Paak. Paak also co-composed the track with musician Dem Jointz and its producers, Jahlil Beats and Antman Wonder. The song was released as a standalone single on May 17, 2018. At the 61st Grammy Awards, it won the award for Best Rap Performance alongside another Aftermath release, "King's Dead". The official remix features an additional verse from Busta Rhymes.

== Reception ==
In a positive review from Pitchfork, Marcus J. Moore described the song as having a "trap-infused bounce beat with heavy drums and rumbling bass".

== Certifications ==
| Region | Certification | Certified units/sales |
|---|---|---|
| United States (RIAA) | Gold | 500,000^{‡} |
^{‡} Sales+streaming figures based on certification alone.
