= Make This Song Cry =

2017 single by K. Michelle

Single by K. Michelle

from the album Kimberly: The People I Used to Know
- Released: October 6, 2017
- Recorded: 2017; Amerycan Recording Studios; Westlake Recording Studios (Los Angeles)
- Genre: R&B
- Length: 3:27
- Label: Atlantic Records
- Songwriters: K. Michelle; Jeremiah Bethea; Phillip Cornish; Shawn Carter
- Producer: Lil' Ronnie

K. Michelle singles chronology
"Either Way" (2017)	"Make This Song Cry" (2017)	"Crazy Like You" (2018)

"Make This Song Cry" is a song recorded by American singer K. Michelle for her fourth studio album, Kimberly: The People I Used to Know (2017). It was released on October 6, 2017, by Atlantic Records as the third single from the album. The song's lyrics were written by K. Michelle, Phillip Cornish, Jeremiah "Sick Pen" Bethea and Douglas Gibbs. It was produced by Lil Ronnie. "Make This Song Cry" received positive reviews from music critics, with some praising the singer's vocal range. It contains a sample from Jay-Z's 2001 single "Song Cry". The track was performed during Michelle's The People I Used to Know Tour in 2017.

The song peaked at number 13 on the Adult R&B Songs chart, spending over twenty-four weeks on the chart. The song also charted at number 44 on the R&B/Hip-Hop Airplay chart and spent six weeks on that chart. Michelle performed "Make This Song Cry" during her album release party for her album Kimberly: The People I Used to Know. She also performed the song at The Ritz in Raleigh, North Carolina on February 25, 2018.

== Production and composition ==
"Make This Song Cry" was written by K. Michelle, Jonas Jeberg, Chloe Angelides, Ashlyn Wilson and James "Gladius" Wong. The track was produced by Lil' Ronnie. Phillip Cornish performed the keyboard and Victor Ekpo performed the violin. Anton Kuhl contributed as the additional producer. Mitch Allan also served as the song's vocal producer, alongside additional vocal producing by Scott Robinson. The track was recorded by Phillip Lynah Jr. at Amerycan Recording Studios, located in Los Angeles. Michelle recorded the vocals with guidance by Jose Balaguer and was assisted by Nicole "Coco" Llorens at Westlake Recording Studios in Los Angeles. The track was eventually mixed by Kevin "KD' Dav. The track was finally mastered by Matt Champlin. The lyrics reflect about leaving all of your past sexual partners to be faithful in a romantic relationship with someone, but eventually later getting hurt by that person which leaves you feeling shameful and regretful. The song was released as the third official single from Kimberly: The People I Used to Know on October 6, 2017. The track sold 3,139 copies in its first week of release. During an interview with Hollywood Life, Michelle said about the song,

I decided to release this song because one day I got upset with my significant other and my feelings were really hurt. My album was complete so I was just singing to get some things off my chest, and after it was done I knew it was a record that every single woman who has made the sacrifice for a man will relate to. I want my fans to take some healing knowing that it ain't easy being a woman in love.

== Critical reception ==
Hype's Brent Faulkner praised Michelle's vocal range on the track, saying that she delivered "powerful, dramatic vocals" and also compared it to "You Changed' by Keyshia Cole from her debut studio album The Way It Is (2006). While reviewing Kimberlyː The People I Used to Know, Glenn Gamboa of Newsday described the track as a "wrenching ballad" and said that Michelle lets "her guard down" in it. Em Casalena of Arena praised the concept of the song, saying "Make This Song Cry is a fan favorite off of Kimberly, where K. Michelle laments sacrificing her integrity to make a relationship work. It's definitely got some vintage vibes to it. The track opens with a soulful saxophone introduction and nineties-era violins and piano melodies that carry K. Michelle's strong vocals above and beyond."

Kel & Mel Reviews reviewed the song, stating "K. Michelle is turning her fandom for JAY Z into her own music. Taking the tagline from his track, Song Cry, she tells us that she isn’t going to let a man see her cry from his hurting her and is going to put that energy into this (or some other) song." ThisIsRnB said "Inspired by the JAY-Z classic, “Song Cry,” the Memphis native uses the same sample from Bobby Glenn's “Sounds Like a Love Song,” as she belts out a personal emotional accounting of heartbreak and karma. YouKnowIGotSoul.com added to their blog "K. Michelle reveals yet another layer off of her upcoming album, with the release of the new single Make This Song Cry."

== Charts ==
Chart (2017)	Peak position
US Adult R&B Songs (Billboard)	13
US R&B/Hip-Hop Airplay (Billboard)	44
