= Either Way (K. Michelle song) =

Single by K. Michelle featuring Chris Brown

from the album Kimberly: The People I Used to Know
- Released: September 15, 2017
- Recorded: 2017
- Genre: Trap
- Length: 4:14
- Label: Atlantic
- Songwriters: Kimberly Pate; Ronnie Jackson; Daniel Bryant; Eric Crawford; Christopher Brown; Jaylen Blakely
- Producers: Lil' Ronnie; Daniel Bryant; Eric Cire

K.Michelle singles chronology
"Birthday" (2017)	"Either Way" (2017)	"Make This Song Cry" (2017)

Chris Brown singles chronology
"Questions" (2017)	"Either Way" (2017)	"Melanin Magic" (2018)

"Either Way" is a song by American singer K. Michelle featuring fellow American singer Chris Brown. The song was released on September 15, 2017 by Atlantic Records as the second single from her fourth studio album Kimberly: The People I Used to Know (2017).

== Critical reception ==
The song gained positive reviews from critics. HotNewHipHop gave the track a positive review stating "Aiming this one at the airwaves, K Michelle delivers an unapologetic record that finds her spitting some braggadocios bars aimed at her haters, while reminding everyone that she gon’ be good “either way.”" Vibe praised the song stating "A series of trap beats and a talk-rap narrative engulf the song’s club-banging track, as she tells all her haters and foes how she’s increasing her bank accounts regardless of their disapproval and constant chatter."

== Formats and track listings ==
- Explicit digital download
1. "Either Way" (feat. Chris Brown) – 4:14
- Clean digital download
1. "Either Way" (feat. Chris Brown) – 4:14

== Chart performance ==
"Either Way" debuted at number 19 on US Billboard R&B Digital Song Sales chart for the week beginning October 7, 2017.

== Charts ==
Chart (2017)	Peak position
US R&B Digital Songs (Billboard)	19

== Release history ==
Country	Date	Format	Version	Label	Ref.
United States	September 15, 2017	Digital download	Clean; Explicit	Atlantic Records	
United Kingdom	September 15, 2017	Digital download	Explicit	Atlantic Records	
