= Joseph Patel =

American producer, director, and journalist

- Born: 1972 (age 53–54)
- Occupations: Producer, director, journalist

Joseph Patel (born 1972) is an American producer, director and journalist. He won an Academy Award in the category Best Documentary Feature Film for the documentary film Summer of Soul.

== Life and career ==
Patel grew up in the San Francisco Bay Area. His father was from Gujarat, India, and his mother was born in Uganda, but after marrying they moved to the United States where Joseph Patel was born. While studying at University of California, Davis, he contributed to student radio station KDVS, and met a group of friends who formed the hip-hop collective SoleSides, including DJ Shadow and Blackalicious.

Under pen name Jazzbo, Patel began writing for hip-hop magazines and blogs Bomb, The Flavor, CDNow, Urb, Straight No Chaser, Rap Pages, Vibe, The Source, and XXL. In 1996, he wrote his first cover story for Rap Pages, on The Roots. This meeting led to a longtime friendship with Roots member Questlove. In 2003, Patel began working for MTV and produced My Block, a series about hip-hop in Houston. He also worked as producer, director, writer and executive for Vevo, Vice, and The Fader alongside MTV.

Later, Questlove invited Patel to work on a documentary about the 1969 Harlem Cultural Festival, which became Summer of Soul. Summer of Soul premiered at the 2021 Sundance Film Festival, where it won both the Audience Award and the Grand Jury Prize. The documentary film won several awards, including Best Documentary Feature at the 6th Critics' Choice Documentary Awards, Best Documentary at the 75th British Academy Film Awards, Best Music Film at the 64th Annual Grammy Awards, Best Documentary at the 2022 Film Independent Spirit Awards, the Award for Outstanding Producer of Documentary Motion Pictures at the 33rd Producers Guild Awards, and Best Documentary Feature at the 94th Academy Awards, making Patel the 10th South Asian winner of an Oscar.

In 2022, Patel was announced as Director and Producer for a documentary on J Dilla. He signed an overall deal with Onyx Collective in 2023, for him to produce, write and direct new projects for Onyx, through his production company Dub Version. He produced Questlove's next film, Sly Lives! (aka The Burden of Black Genius), a documentary about Sly Stone, which premiered at the 2025 Sundance Film Festival.

== Awards and nominations ==
=== Academy Awards ===
| Year | Nominee / work | Award | Result |
|---|---|---|---|
| 2022 | Summer of Soul (...Or, When the Revolution Could Not Be Televised) | Best Documentary Feature Film | Won |
