= Make Believe (Platinum Weird album) =

Studio album by Platinum Weird
- Released: October 2006
- Recorded: 1974 (fictional); 2005–2006 (actual)
- Studio: Basing Street Studios and Mayfair Studios, London
- Genre: Pop rock, soft rock
- Length: 38:06
- Label: Weapons of Mass Entertainment / Interscope
- Producer: Dave Stewart, Dennis Douglas

Professional ratings
Review scores
Source	Rating
Allmusic	3/5 stars

Make Believe is the first album by Platinum Weird. To tie in with the band's back-story, it was marketed as a "lost" album from 1974, with vocals credited to fictional lead singer Erin Grace. In reality, the album was written and recorded in 2005 and 2006, with vocals by Kara DioGuardi. The album features Ringo Starr on two tracks.

== Track listing ==
All songs written by Erin Grace (a.k.a. Kara DioGuardi) and Dave Stewart.

1. "Will You Be Around" - 3:32
2. "Lonely Eyes" - 3:26
3. "Happiness" - 3:33
4. "Make Believe" - 3:32
5. "Picture Perfect" - 4:06
6. "If You Believe in Love" - 3:28
7. "Love Can Kill the Blues" - 5:04
8. "I Pray" - 3:24
9. "Piccadilly Lane" - 3:09
10. "Goodbye My Love" - 4:52

=== Best Buy bonus disc track listing ===
Versions of the album sold at Best Buy included a bonus disc, Platinum Weird: Unreleased Tracks 2006, containing alternate versions of four Make Believe tracks as well as eight otherwise unreleased tracks. This collection of songs was also distributed on its own as a promotional CD, titled simply Platinum Weird.

"Taking Chances" would later be covered by Celine Dion and released as a single in 2007.

1. "Happiness" - 4:37*
2. "Taking Chances" - 4:04
3. "Will You Be Around" - 4:01*
4. "Nobody Sees" - 3:38
5. "Crying at the Disco" - 4:12
6. "Avalanche" - 4:01
7. "Somebody to Love" - 3:38
8. "All My Sorrows" - 4:38
9. "Love Can Kill the Blues" - 4:25*
10. "Mississippi Valentine" - 4:05
11. "I Pray" - 4:18*
12. "When We Met" - 2:51
  - Alternate versions of album tracks

== Personnel ==
- Erin Grace (a.k.a. Kara DioGuardi) - vocals
- Dave Stewart - guitars, vocals, harmonica
- Noel Chambers - organ, piano, mellotron
- Matthew Sugarman - bass
- Brian Parfitt - drums
- Ringo Starr - drums (4, 6)
- Michael Addison - audio engineer
- Elton John & Steve Brown - executive producers
- "Big Al" Lakey - album artwork
