= Venice (Anderson .Paak album) =

Studio album by Anderson .Paak
- Released: October 28, 2014
- Genre: Hip-hop; R&B; soul
- Length: 50:35
- Label: Steel Wool; OBE; Empire
- Producer: Lo_Def; DJ Nobody; DK the Punisher; Anderson .Paak; Mikos the Gawd; Kelsey Gonzalez; Tokimonsta; Ta-Ku

Anderson .Paak chronology
Cover Art (2013)	Venice (2014)	Malibu (2016)

Singles from Venice
- 1. "Drugs" Released: January 17, 2014; 2. "Miss Right" Released: October 14, 2014

Venice is the debut studio album by American singer Anderson .Paak. It was released on October 28, 2014, by Steel Wool, OBE and Empire Distribution. Anderson .Paak produced the album, alongside several other record producers such as Lo_Def, DJ Nobody, DK the Punisher, Mikos the Gawd, Kelsey Gonzalez, Tokimonsta, Ta-Ku; as well as a guest appearance from SiR. The album was supported by two singles: "Drugs" and "Miss Right". The album also features lead guitar work by Jose Rios, acoustic & bass guitar from Kelsey Gonzalez and keyboard from Ron Avant, all members of his backing band, The Free Nationals.

== Singles ==
The album's first single, called "Drugs", was released on January 17, 2014. The song was produced by Lo_Def.

The album's second single, called "Miss Right", was released on October 14, 2014. The song was produced by Anderson .Paak himself.

== Reception ==
Professional ratings
Review scores
Source	Rating
The Independent	favorable
Potholes in My Blog	3.5/5 stars

== Track listing ==
No.	Title	Writer(s)	Producer(s)	Length
1.	"Waves"		Lo_Def	0:26
2.	"Milk n' Honey"	Brandon Anderson; Elvin Estela	DJ Nobody	4:18
3.	"The City"	Anderson; Donovan Knight	D.K. the Punisher	3:34
4.	"Might Be"	Anderson; Matthew Merisola; Frank Alstin Jr; Charles B. Simmons; Richard Roebuck	Lo_Def	3:57
5.	"Miss Right"	Anderson	Anderson .Paak	3:18
6.	"Put You On"	Anderson; Merisola	Lo_Def	2:43
7.	"Already" (featuring SiR)	Anderson; Miles Mikos Douglas	Mikos the Gawd	3:14
8.	"Dogtown"		Lo_Def; Kelsey Gonzalez	0:26
9.	"I Miss That Whip"	Anderson; Merisola; Gonzales	Gonzalez; Lo_Def	3:08
10.	"Get 'Em Up"	Anderson; Jennifer Lee	Tokimonsta	4:08
11.	"Paint"	Anderson; Merisola	Lo_Def	3:57
12.	"Drugs"	Anderson; Merisola	Lo_Def	4:52
13.	"Miki Doralude"		Lo_Def; Gonzalez	0:50
14.	"Luh You"	Anderson; Merisola	Lo_Def	3:30
15.	"Right There"	Anderson; Merisola; Regan Mathews	Ta-Ku	3:27
16.	"Off the Ground"	Anderson; Merisola	Lo_Def	4:48
Total length:				50:35
