= Platinum Hit =

- Genre: Talent show
- Created by: Evan Bogart
- Presented by: Jewel
- Judges: Kara DioGuardi; Jewel
- Country of origin: United States
- Original language: English
- No. of seasons: 1
- No. of episodes: 10

Production
- Running time: 60 minutes

Original release
- Network: Bravo
- Release: May 30 – August 5, 2011

Platinum Hit is a 2011 reality competition series on Bravo, in which 12 singer-songwriters compete through innovative songwriting challenges that tested their creativity, patience and drive. The series was created and produced by Evan Bogart. Every episode featured a different topic – from a dance track to a love ballad – that required the contestants to write and perform lyrics from various genres, for a cash prize of $100,000, a publishing deal with songwriting collective The Writing Camp, and a recording deal with RCA/Jive label. The show ran for one season, and Sonyae Elise was named the winner of that season.

The show was originally to be entitled Hitmakers and was later changed to Going Platinum before settling on its final title.

== Judges and hosts ==
Kara DioGuardi was the head judge. Jewel served as both host and judge.

Other guest judges include Leona Lewis, Natasha Bedingfield, Donna Summer, Taio Cruz, Jermaine Dupri, Ryan Tedder and Keith Naftaly. Platinum Hit premiered on May 30, 2011, and was shown Mondays at 10 pm Eastern/Pacific until June 27, 2011. Effective July 8, 2011, Platinum Hit was shown Fridays at 8 pm for the rest of its run.

== Contestants ==
Name	Occupation	Age	Birthplace	Residence	Styles	Bio page	Result
Sonyae Elise	Singer	22	Newark/Montclair, NJ	Los Angeles, CA	R&B, hip hop		Winner (08-05-2011)
Jes Hudak	Musician	29	Saratoga Springs, NY	Los Angeles, CA	Pop, piano rock, indie pop		2nd place (08-05-2011)
Scotty Granger	Creative dir. for Jordin Sparks	23	New Orleans, LA	Los Angeles, CA	R&B, pop, dance		3rd place (08-05-2011)
Nick Nittoli	Telemarketer	23	Garfield, NJ	Los Angeles, CA	Pop, rock, alternative rock		4th place (07-29-2011)
Brian Judah	Computer store employee	32	Studio City, CA	Los Angeles, CA	Alternative rock, pop, rock, dance, hip hop, country		5th place (07-22-2011)
Johnny Marnell	Software engineer	28	Kingston, NY	Brooklyn, NY	Pop, folk, rock, soul, R&B, alternative rock, blues, country		6th place (07-15-2011)
Jackie Tohn	Musician	30	Oceanside, NY	Los Angeles, CA	Folk pop, blues, reggae		7th place (07-08-2011)
Melissa Rapp	Musician	32	Honolulu, HI	Los Angeles, CA	Blue-eyed soul, pop		8th place (06-27-2011)
Amber Ojeda	Waitress	27	San Diego, CA	Los Angeles, CA	Neo soul, jazz		9th place (06-20-2011)
Karen Waldrup	Sales rep.	24	Mandeville, LA	Nashville, TN	Country, country rock		10th place (06-13-2011)
Blessing Offor	Musician	22	New Haven, CT	Queens, NY	Pop, R&B, soul		11th place (06-06-2011)
Nevin James	Student	22	Pittsburgh, PA	Malibu, CA	Rock, folk rock		12th place (05-30-2011)

== Contestant progress ==
Place	Episode	1	2	3	4	5	6	7	8	9	10
	Hook Challenge Winners	Sonyae Nick Scotty Jackie	Brian Karen Scotty	Johnny Jes Jackie	Johnny Sonyae Jackie	Sonyae Nick Jes	Jackie Johnny Jes	N/A^{[II]}	Brian Scotty	Scotty^{[III]}	N/A^{[IV]}
1	Sonyae	SAFE	WIN	LOW	HIGH	WIN^{[I]}	LOW	WIN	WIN	WIN	WIN
2	Jes	WIN	SAFE	HIGH	WIN	LOW	SAFE	HIGH	LOW	SAFE	OUT
3	Scotty	LOW	WIN	WIN	WIN	WIN	LOW	HIGH	WIN	SAFE	OUT
4	Nick	WIN	WIN	LOW	HIGH	HIGH	SAFE	LOW	WIN	OUT	
5	Brian	LOW	SAFE	WIN	LOW	WIN	WIN	WIN	OUT		
6	Johnny	HIGH	LOW	WIN	WIN	HIGH	WIN	OUT			
7	Jackie	HIGH	SAFE	LOW	LOW	HIGH	OUT				
8	Melissa	HIGH	WIN	HIGH	HIGH	OUT					
9	Amber	SAFE	LOW	HIGH	OUT						
10	Karen	WIN	LOW	OUT							
11	Blessing	SAFE	OUT								
12	Nevin	OUT									

WIN The songwriter won the competition.
WIN The songwriter provided the hook for the winning song.
WIN The songwriter was selected as the winner of the episode's Elimination Challenge.
HIGH The songwriter was one of the best song entries but was not selected as the winning song.
SAFE The songwriter was not selected as either a top entry or a bottom entry in the Elimination Challenge, and advanced to the next challenge.
LOW The songwriter was on the Losing Song entries but was not eliminated.
LOW The songwriter was selected as one of the bottom two song entries in the Elimination Challenge and was up for elimination.
OUT The songwriter was eliminated from the competition.
OUT The songwriter was the runner-up.
OUT The songwriter was the second runner-up.

^{^[I]} Sonyae was granted immunity in Week 6 by the judges by contributing the most to the winning song in Week 5.
^{^[II]} There were no hook challenge winners in Week 7 because the remaining songwriters were paired up before they had to present their hooks.
^{^[III]} Scotty won the hook challenge in Week 9 but the remaining songwriters wrote their songs individually.
^{^[IV]} There were no hook challenge winners in Week 10 because the remaining songwriters wrote their songs individually.

== Episodes ==
=== Week 1 ===
Date of broadcast: May 30, 2011

Subject: Songs About Los Angeles

Judges:

1. Kara DioGuardi (head judge)
2. Jewel
3. Trevor Jerideau, Vice President A&R of RCA/Jive Label Group (guest judge)
4. Jermaine Dupri of So So Def Recordings (special guest judge)

Qualifying hooks:

1. Sonyae Elise: "Love It or Hate It". She chose Blessing Offor and Amber Ojeda for her team.
2. Nick Nittoli: "My City". He chose Jes Hudak and Karen Waldrup for his team.
3. Scotty Granger: "No One". He chose Brian Judah and Nevin James for his team.
4. Jackie Tohn: "City of Dreams". She picked Johnny Marnell and Melissa Rapp for her team.

Non-qualifying hooks (in order of appearance):

- Johnny Marnell: "Lost in Los Angeles"
- Blessing Offor: "Smile for Me L.A."
- Amber Ojeda: "L.A. with Me Tonight"
- Melissa Rapp: "Our Town"
- Jes Hudak: "Fake"
- Brian Judah: "City of Make-Believe"
- Karen Waldrup: "Southern Spice"
- Nevin James: "You'll Never Be My Home"

Final results:

1. "My City" – Nick Nittoli (hook) and Jes Hudak and Karen Waldrup (contributors)
2. "City of Dreams" – Jackie Tohn (hook) and Johnny Marnell and Melissa Rapp (contributors)
3. "Love It or Hate It" – Sonyae Elise (hook) and Blessing Offor and Amber Ojeda (contributors)
4. "No One" – Scotty Granger (hook) and Brian Judah and Nevin James (contributors)

Eliminated:

- Nevin James – finishing 12th

=== Week 2 ===
Date of broadcast: June 6, 2011

Subject: Dance Songs

Judges:

1. Kara DioGuardi
2. Jewel
3. Trevor Jerideau (guest judge)
4. Donna Summer (special guest judge)

Qualifying hooks:

- Brian Judah: "My Ridiculous". He chose Jes Hudak and Jackie Tohn (also passed his right of choosing a fourth partner)
- Karen Waldrup: "Make It Easy". She chose Blessing Offor, Amber Ojeda and Johnny Marnell
- Scotty Granger: "Paint the Club with Amazing". He chose Nick Nittoli, Melissa Rapp and Sonyae Elise

Non-qualifying hooks (in order of appearance):

- Jackie Tohn: "Unsinkable"
- Blessing Offor: "Dance Romance"
- Nick Nittoli: "Moonwalk"
- Amber Ojeda: "This is the Last Time"
- Sonyae Elise: "Free"
- Melissa Rapp: "Hurricane"
- Johnny Marnell: "Push on You"
- Jes Hudak: "Till We See the Sunlight"

Final results:

1. "Paint This Club (With Amazing)" – Scotty Granger (hook) and Nick Nittoli, Melissa Rapp and Sonyae Elise (contributors)
2. "My Ridiculous" – Brian Judah (hook) and Jes Hudak and Jackie Tohn (contributors)
3. "Make It Easy" – Karen Waldrup (hook) and Blessing Offor, Amber Ojeda and Johnny Marnell (contributors)

Eliminated: Blessing Offor – finishing 11th

=== Week 3 ===
Date of broadcast: June 13, 2011

Subject: Road Trip Songs

Judges:

1. Kara DioGuardi
2. Jewel
3. Keith Naftaly (guest judge) – Senior Vice President for Jive Records
4. Natasha Bedingfield (special guest judge)

Qualifying hooks: (in parentheses, one-word lead drawn through a card)

1. Johnny Marnell: "Going Where I Need to Be" / ('Escape'). He chose Brian Judah and Scotty Granger
2. Jes Hudak: "Home for Me" / ('Free'). She chose Amber Ojeda and Melissa Rapp
3. Jackie Tohn: "The Road is Where My Heart Is" / ('Road'). She chose Karen Waldrup and Sonyae Elise, joined by Nick Nittoli (passed by both Johnny and Jes)

Non-qualifying hooks (in order of appearance): (in parentheses, one-word lead drawn through a card)

- Melissa Rapp: ('Change')
- Amber Ojeda: ('View')
- Karen Waldrup: ('Away')
- Scotty Granger: ('Pack')
- Sonyae Elise: ('Explore')
- Nik Nittoli: ('Wheels')
- Brian Judah: ('Direction')

Final results:

1. "Going Where I Need to Be": Johnny Marnell (hook) and Brian Judah and Scotty Granger (contributors)
2. "Free": Jes Hudak (hook) and Amber Ojeda and Melissa Rapp (contributors)
3. "The Road is Where My Heart Is" – Jackie Tohn (hook) and Karen Waldrup, Sonyae Elise and Nick Nittoli (contributors)

Eliminated: Karen Waldrup – finishing 10th

=== Week 4 ===
Date of broadcast: June 20, 2011

Subject: Rap Songs

Judges:

1. Kara DioGuardi
2. Jewel
3. Keith Naftaly (guest judge)
4. Rodney Jerkins (special guest judge)

Qualifying hooks:

1. Johnny Marnell: "Walk through Walls". He chose Scotty Granger and Jes Hudak
2. Sonyae Elise: "Miss Make the Boys Cry". She chose Nick Nittoli and Melissa Rapp
3. Jackie Tohn: "Super Duper Rapper". She chose Brian Judah and Amber Ojeda

Non-qualifying hooks (in order of appearance):

- Melissa Rapp: "In An Hour"
- Amber Ojeda: "Quiet Storm"
- Jes Hudak: "Hard Hearted Truth"
- Brian Judah: "Down South"
- Nick Nittoli: "Invisiman (Get Up)"
- Scotty Granger: "Boy I Wanna (Love You Down)"

Final results:

1. "Walk through Walls" – Johnny Marnell (hook) and Scotty Granger and Jes Hudak (contributors)
2. "Miss Make the Boys Cry" – Sonyae Elise (hook) and Nick Nittoli and Melissa Rapp (contributors)
3. "Super Duper Rapper" – Jackie Tohn (hook) and Brian Judah and Amber Ojeda (contributors)

Eliminated: Amber Ojeda – finishing 9th

=== Week 5 ===
Date of broadcast: June 27, 2011

Subject: Love Songs

Judges:

1. Kara DioGuardi
2. Jewel
3. Keith Naftaly (guest judge)
4. Ryan Tedder, lead singer of OneRepublic, (special guest judge)

Qualifying hooks:

1. Sonyae Elise: "Love Me to Life". She chose Scotty Granger and Brian Judah for her team, and as a prize for having the best hook was permitted to assign teams for the team challenge.
2. Nick Nittoli: "Stuck On You". Sonyae assigned Jackie Tohn and Johnny Marnell to his team
3. Jes Hudak: "It's You". Melissa Rapp was paired with her after Sonyae did not assign her to another team.

Non-qualifying hooks (in order of appearance):

- Melissa Rapp: "Dizzy"
- Jackie Tohn: "Before I Get to You"
- Brian Judah: "Notice"
- Scotty Granger: "Love Me or Not"
- Johnny Marnell: "Wake Up to You"

Final results:

1. "Love Me to Life" – Sonyae Elise (hook) and Scotty Granger and Brian Judah (contributors)
2. "Stuck On You" – Nick Nittoli (hook) and Jackie Tohn and Johnny Marnell (contributors)
3. "It's You" – Jes Hudak (hook) and Melissa Rapp (contributor)

Eliminated:

- Melissa Rapp – finishing 8th

=== Week 6 ===
Date of broadcast: July 8, 2011

Subject: Risky Songs

Judges:

1. Kara DioGuardi
2. Jewel
3. Keith Naftaly (guest judge)
4. Bonnie McKee (guest judge)

Qualifying hooks:

1. Jackie Tohn: "Say It Back" – She chose Scotty Granger and Sonyae Elise to her team
2. Johnny Marnell: "Betting My Life On You" – He chose Brian Judah to his team
3. Jes Hudak: "Save Yourself" – She chose Nick Nittoli to her team

Non-Qualifying hooks:

1. Nick Nittoli: "Risky Business"
2. Sonyae Elise: "Jumping Out the Window"
3. Brian Judah: "Heart In My Hands"
4. Scotty Granger: "Melt"

Final Results:

1. "Betting My Life On You" – Johnny Marnell (hook) and Brian Judah (contributor)
2. "Save Yourself" – Jes Hudak (hook) and Nick Nittoli (contributor)
3. "Say It Back" – Jackie Tohn (hook) and Scotty Granger and Sonyae Elise (contributors)

Eliminated: Jackie Tohn – finishing 7th

=== Week 7 ===
Date of broadcast: July 15, 2011

Subject: Songs For Other Artists

Judges:

1. Kara DioGuardi
2. Jewel
3. Keith Naftaly (guest judge)
4. Evan "Kidd" Bogart (guest judge)

Qualifying hooks:

1. Scotty Granger & Jes Hudak: "Love You Down" – Written for Justin Bieber
2. Sonyae Elise & Brian Judah: "Stranger to Love" – Written for Beyoncé
3. Johnny Marnell & Nick Nittoli: "All Day Sunrise" – Written for Gavin DeGraw

Final Results:

1. "Stranger to Love" – Sonyae Elise (hook) and Brian Judah (contributor)
2. "Love You Down" – Scotty Granger (hook) and Jes Hudak (contributor)
3. "All Day Sunrise" – Johnny Marnell (hook) and Nick Nittoli (contributor)

Eliminated: Johnny Marnell – finishing 6th

=== Week 8 ===
Date of broadcast: July 22, 2011

Subject: Inspiring Songs

Judges:

1. Kara DioGuardi
2. Jewel
3. Keith Naftaly
4. Doug Brod of Spin (special appearance with announcement that this week's winner would appear in a feature in Spin)
5. Colbie Caillat (special guest judge)

Qualifying hooks:

1. Brian Judah: "The Last Candle" – He chose Jes Hudak (but passed on having Nick Nittoli on his team to Scotty)
2. Scotty Granger: "Reign" – He chose Sonyae Elise and got Nick Nittoli by default

Non-qualifying hooks (in order of appearance):

1. Jes Hudak: "Underestimate Away"
2. Nick Nittoli: "Kiss the Flame"
3. Sonyae Elise: "Tomorrow Is Too Late"

Final Results:

1. "Reign" – Scotty Granger (hook), Sonyae Elise and Nick Nittoli (contributors) – Nittoli singled out for having the best contribution and will appear in a feature in Spin magazine.
2. "The Last Candle" – Brian Judah (hook), Jes Hudak (contributor)

Eliminated : Brian Judah – finishing 5th

=== Week 9 ===
Date of broadcast: July 29, 2011 (Final 4)

Subject: Solo Challenge – Pop hook

Judges:

1. Kara DioGuardi
2. Jewel
3. Keith Naftaly
4. Perez Hilton
5. Taio Cruz (special guest judge)

Hooks:

1. Scotty Granger: "DJ Have My Babies" – Although there were no teams for this week's final song, Scotty won the hook challenge.
2. Sonyae Elise: "Exit"
3. Jes Hudak: "So See Through"
4. Nick Nittoli: "Boom Boom"

Final Results:

1. "Exit" – Sonyae Elise
2. "World's Last Spin" – Scotty Granger
3. "See Through" – Jes Hudak
4. "My Mistake" – Nick Nittoli

Eliminated: Nick Nittoli – finishing 4th

=== Week 10 ===
Date of broadcast: August 5, 2011 (finale)

Subject: Write The Biggest Hit of Your Life

Judges:

1. Kara DioGuardi
2. Jewel
3. Keith Naftaly
4. Leona Lewis (Special Guest Judge)

Final Results:

1. "My Religion" – Sonyae Elise (Winner)
2. "Come Alive" – Jes Hudak (Runner-Up)
3. "Beautiful You" – Scotty Granger (2nd Runner-Up)

== After the show ==
After the show, Platinum Hit released the single "My Religion" by the winner Sonyae Elise. She also won $100,000 as a cash prize, an RCA/Jive Records contract, and a publishing deal with The Writing Camp.

== Record releases ==
All released in 2011

- This is Platinum Hit (Episode 1)
- Dance Floor Royalty (Episode 2)
- Wheels Up (Episode 3)
- Rap Heroes (Episode 4)
- The L Word (Episode 5)
- We Are Risk Takers (Episode 6)
- Somebody is Lying (Episode 7)
- Kiss the Flame (Episode 8)
- Make It Pop (Episode 9)
- The Finale (Episode 10)
- Platinum Hit: The Winning Songs Live (Live Performances from Episodes 1–5)
- Platinum Hit: The Winning Songs Live (Live Performances from Episodes 6–10)
- Platinum Hit: The Winning Songs, Season One
