= Adrian L. Miller =

American music executive

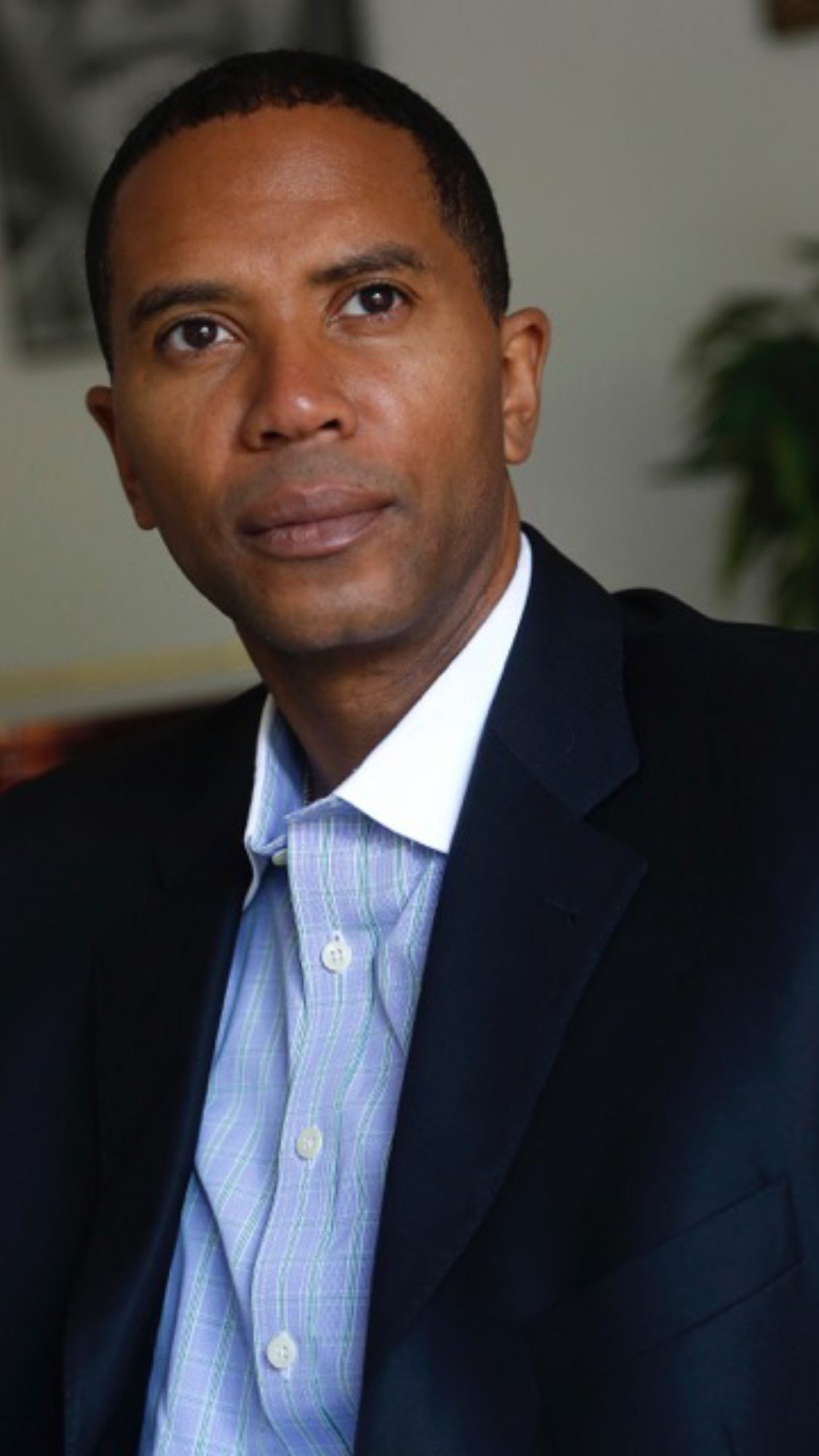
- Self-portrait photograph
- Born: St. Louis, Missouri, U.S.
- Education: University of Tulsa (History major); Livingstone College (Doctorate)
- Occupations: Music entertainment executive; record producer; executive producer; Music supervisor
- Years active: 1989–present
- Notable work: Malibu by Anderson .Paak; The Jungle Is The Only Way Out by Mereba; Wu-Tang Clan: American Saga (music supervisor)

Adrian L. Miller is an American music entertainment executive, manager, music supervisor, and executive producer. Miller also serves as owner and managing partner of the agency Xyion.

Miller is also known for his A&R and music management, namely for the artist Anderson .Paak. Under Miller's management, Anderson has won numerous Grammy Awards, with Miller serving as executive producer for all his album releases.

== Early life and education ==
Miller was born in St. Louis, Missouri. Growing up, he split his time between St. Louis and Los Angeles. His father Sylvester owned a Black Circle Records Store, where Miller first became interested in music. During interviews, he recalled his father telling him about various artists and learning about music through reading credits on vinyls. His love for music from a young age pushed Miller to pursue becoming a rapper. He also spent time as a breakdancer with St. Louis City Breakers.

In 1988, Miller was accepted at the University of Tulsa where he majored in theatre and history. In 2023, he was the recipient of an honorary doctorate from Livingstone College.

== Career ==
While studying at the University of Tulsa, Miller began working at radio station KBLK. He started with working his way into an on-air position as a host in 1989. Miller began networking while working as a host, landing other music industry roles. He worked for S.O.U.L. (Sound of Urban Listeners) and MCA street team, before he graduated from university in 1991. On returning to Los Angeles, he was hired by PMP Records where he worked alongside its founder, Paul Stewart. He got his first experience of music management as an assistant while at PMP. One of the first artists Miller was involved with was Daz Dillinger, who at the time was known under a different name. Rapper Coolio was signed under PMP Records, along with House of Pain and The Pharcyde with Miller working with all the acts in various capacities. He was redirected from Hits magazine for a short period, where he created the Rap Music Chart, which still exists until today.

He then moved to Loud Records which gave Miller the opportunity to work with other acts such as Twista and Wu-Tang Clan. While at Loud, Miller and others became known for their unique ways of marketing an artist. One instance was when they noticed how fast Twista could rap. He and Twista's team suggested that he held a rap battle with Daddy Freddy and the winner would receive the Guinness World Record as fastest rapper. Loud's artist Twista won the battle and still holds the world record today.

In late 1991, Immortal Records was formed by Happy Walters and Amanda Demme. Miller's networking since he started at KBLK and in LA gave him the opportunity to head-up Immortal's A&R shortly after it was founded. It was at Immortal where he began to have success, namely with Funkdoobiest in 1991. Miller worked with other artists, such as Volume 10, Incubus, and Korn. Miller was recruited at age 24 by Warner Bros. Records to work as part of the label's A&R department under Benny Medina. Miller managed numerous acts in the late 1990s and early 2000s, including Flo Rida’s early career.

In 2009, Miller formed Xyion Inc., his music management company. In 2011, he was working with a rap group when they introduced him to a friend who later became known as Anderson .Paak. Collaborating with D'Angelo's manager Dominique Trenier, Miller secured Anderson a deal with film director F. Gary Gray to record the backing track for a Harley-Davidson ad Gray was directing. From there they started working together, with Anderson releasing the Cover Art in June 2013. The success of the EP led to the creation of the record label OBE, co-founded by Miller and Anderson .Paak.

Miller struck two deals in late 2014 for Anderson. The first was for Anderson .Paak to feature on six tracks on Dr. Dre's album Compton. Compton was certified Gold by the Recording Industry Association of America (RIAA). In 2016, Miller served as executive producer on Anderson's award-winning album Malibu. It was nominated for Best Urban Contemporary Album at the 59th Annual Grammy Awards. Miller received the Cannes Lion Award for his work on the 2018 Apple Music Home Pod commercial directed by Spike Jonze. Anderson picked up numerous awards in 2016 as a result, including the 2016 Centric Certified Award, and was also nominated for Best New Artist. Anderson also picked up The Grulke Prize at SXSW 2016.

Miller collaborated with Delicious Vinyl record label owner Michael Ross and Leslie Cooney to reboot the label, now called Delicious Vinyl Island. In addition to management and label ownership, Miller also currently does music supervision and music consulting for film and television projects. Miller released the soundtrack to the movie Karen on his label ATU, and was also music supervisor.

In 2023, Miller was the music supervisor for season 3 of the Hulu TV series, Wu-Tang: An American Saga. During the same year, Miller announced he would be partnering with Livingstone College to create a School of Music at the college campus. It will serve as a catalyst for the creation of both a communications major and certification program alongside the college's current degree program. The school building is to be named after Miller's son and will be called The Adrian M. Miller Conservatory in Frequency and Harmony. It will contain a state of the art recording studio for the students of Livingstone College to use. In April 2023, Rolling Stone interviewed Miller speaking about his entire career and future goals.
