= Wendy Day =

American talent agent

Wendy Day (born 1962) is a mentor and consultant for hip-hop artists. In 1992, she founded the Rap Coalition, a not-for-profit organization helping artists navigate the industry more advantageously. She also founded the consulting firm PowerMoves, advising artists and labels on independent options.

== Rap Coalition ==
In one account, Rap Coalition was founded in 1992 once Day sold her condo, investments, and car to fund the not-for-profit organization. In any case, it would help hip-hop artists learn of exploitative practices, connect with artists sharing interests, and, through a support group, navigate the industry.

Throughout the 1990s, Day brokered landmark deals: Master P and No Limit Records’ 85/15 distribution deal with Priority Records, Twista’s 50/50 venture with Atlantic Records, and Cash Money Records’ $30 million deal with Universal Music Group.

Day organized the 1997 Rap Olympics, whereby Eminem, invited by Day via his debut album Infinite to perform, gained an Interscope Records deal. Day also assisted Lil Wayne, B.G., Juvenile, the Hot Boys, C-Murder, Fiend, Do or Die, Boosie, Webbie, David Banner, Ras Kass, Trouble, and Young Buck, among others. Altogether, Day's clients have sold over $1 billion of sound recordings.

== Other projects ==
Day also operates the music-consulting company PowerMoves, which advises artists and independent record labels on options without sponsorship by a major record label. PowerMoves also helps artists gain direct investors apart from record labels.

Day authored the book How to Get a Record Deal, revised in 2016, whose audiobook is narrated by Slick Rick.

In 2023, Day joined beatBread's Artist Advocacy Council, which provides critical advice to the independent artist-focused music funding platform.
