= Sonyae Elise =

American singer-songwriter

Sonyae
- Born: Sonyae Elise Covington; Newark, New Jersey, U.S.
- Genres: R&B
- Occupations: Singer; songwriter
- Instrument: Vocals
- Formerly of: The Writing Camp
- Website: www.sonyaeelise.com

Sonyae Elise Covington is an American singer and songwriter. Based in Los Angeles, she won the inaugural and only season of Platinum Hit, an American television show on Bravo about competing emerging songwriters. Her prize included US$100,000 as a cash prize, an RCA/Jive Records contract and a publishing deal with The Writing Camp.

According to her interview with Billboard, Elise does not read music nor can she play any instruments. "I have a lot of old stuff at my mother's house, notebooks and things with scripts and lyrics written in them. I did a lot of theater – 'Grease,' 'The Lion King' – and I wanted to write music for plays. Lyrics came naturally to me. I listened to a lot of pop music and KRS-One and MC Lyte and I saw [writing] as a way to express my thoughts." For her winning song, she wrote "My Religion", which was released as her 2011 single after her victory.

== Songwriting credits and other vocal appearances ==
Credits and appearances are courtesy of Discogs and AllMusic.

Title	Year	Artist	Album
"Hey Baby (Jump Off)"	2007	Omarion & Bow Wow	Face Off
"Tell Me More"	2009	Havoc	Hidden Files
"Stranger To Love"	2011	Bridget Kelly	Every Girl-EP
"Everyday"	2015	Machine Gun Kelly	General Admission
"Dedicated"	2015	The Game	The Documentary 2
"Crenshaw / 80s and Cocaine"	2015	The Game	The Documentary 2.5
"In Or Out"	2015	Young Greatness	I Tried To Tell Em
"Room in Here"	2016	Anderson Paak	Malibu
"Young Niggas"	2016	The Game	1992
"Copenhagen"	2016	Jeremih	Late Nights: Europe (Mixtape)
"Birthday"	2017	K. Michelle	Kimberly: The People I Used to Know
"Momma (Outro)"	2017	Lil Yachty	Teenage Emotions
"Wiseguy Love"	2017	CHG	Lifestyle
"$IP"	2018	Qveen Herby	EP 4
"Chosen One"	2019	Anderson Paak	Ventura
"Collide"	2019	Tiana Major9 (feat. EarthGang)	Queen & Slim: The Soundtrack
"Go Girl"	2025	Summer Walker (feat. Latto & Doja Cat)	Finally Over It

== Awards and nominations ==
Year	Ceremony	Award	Result	Ref
2021	63rd Annual Grammy Awards	Grammy Award for Best R&B Song ("Collide")	Nominated	
