= Painless (disambiguation) =

Painless refers to the absence of pain.

Painless may also refer to:

- Painless (film), a 2012 fantasy horror film
- Painless (album), a 2022 album by Nilüfer Yanya
- "Painless" (song), a 1991 single by Baby Animals
- Painless (House), an episode of the television series House
- "The Painless", a track on the 1991 album Gothic by Paradise Lost
