= Wilma Archer =

English musical artist

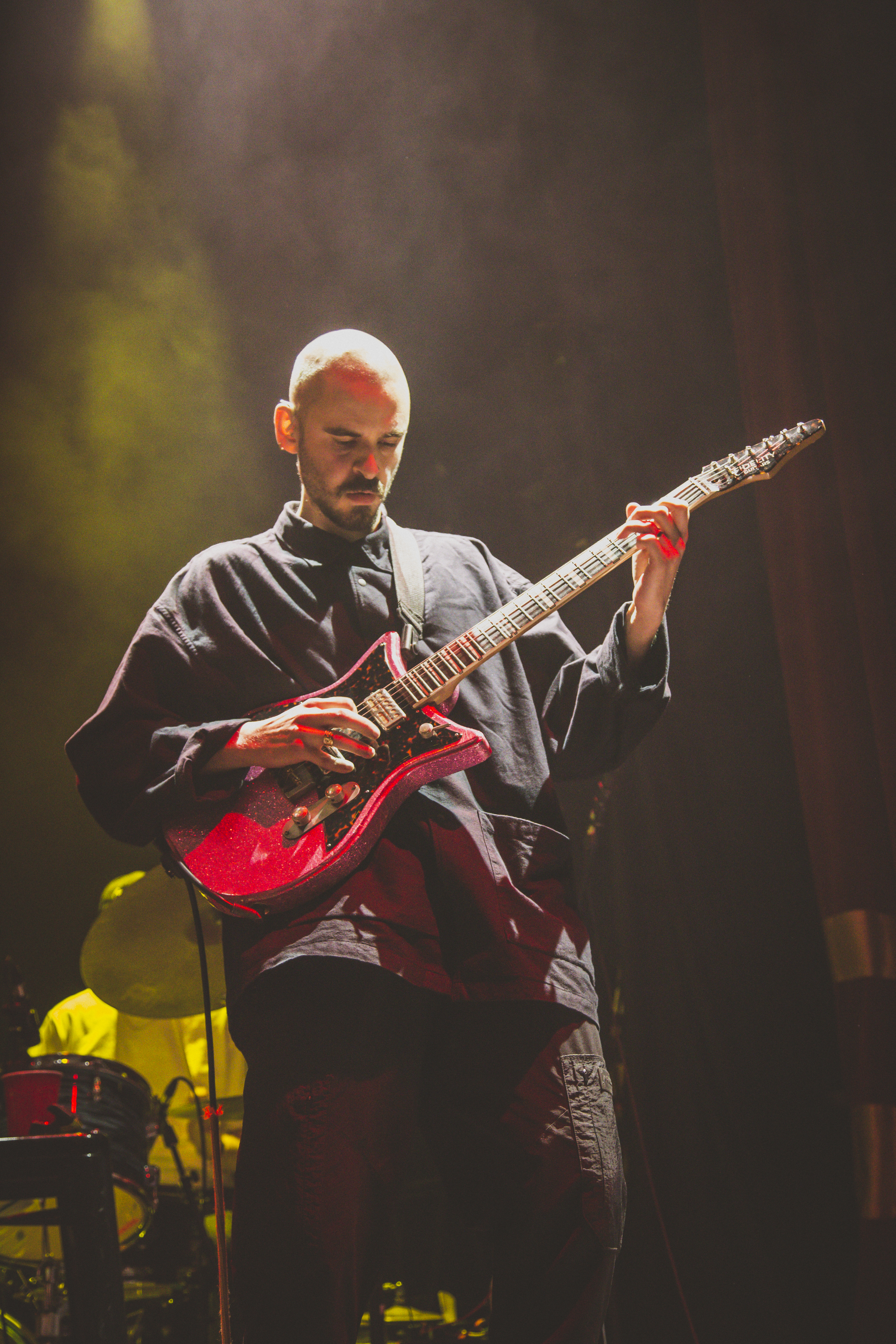
- Archer playing with Nilüfer Yanya in 2024

Background information
- Also known as: Slime
- Born: Will Archer; 1991 (age 34–35); Newcastle upon Tyne, England
- Occupations: Multi-instrumentalist; record producer
- Years active: 2010–present
- Label: Weird World

Will Archer (born 1991), formerly better known by his stage names Slime, and now Wilma Archer, is an English record producer and multi-instrumentalist from Newcastle upon Tyne. He is based in London.

== Early life ==
Will Archer was born in 1991 in Newcastle upon Tyne. He studied sound art and design at the London College of Communication.

== Career ==
In 2015, Archer released his debut studio album, Company, under the moniker Slime. It includes guest appearances from Selah Sue and Jeremiah Jae.

In 2017, he released a single, "Like a Hunger", under the moniker Wilma Archer.

He is one half of the duo Wilma Vritra along with Pyramid Vritra. The duo's debut studio album, Burd, was released in 2019. A second record, entitled Grotto, followed in 2022.

On 3 April 2020 he released his studio album, A Western Circular, under the moniker Wilma Archer. The album featured MF Doom, Samuel T. Herring, Sudan Archives, and Laura Groves.

Since 2020, Archer has worked closely with Nilüfer Yanya as both co-writer and producer, contributing to her 2019 debut album Miss Universe and the Feeling Lucky? EP that directly followed its release, and has since become much more extensively involved in the subsequent studio albums, 2022's Painless and My Method Actor from 2024.

== Discography ==
=== Studio albums ===
- Company (2015) (as Slime)
- Burd (2019) (with Pyramid Vritra, as Wilma Vritra)
- A Western Circular (2020) (as Wilma Archer)
- Grotto (2022) (with Pyramid Vritra, as Wilma Vritra)

=== Mixtapes ===
- In the Brick House (2014) (as Slime)

=== EPs ===
- Increases (2011) (as Slime)
- Increases II (2012) (as Slime)

=== Singles ===
- "My Company" b/w "In One Year" (2015) (as Slime)
- "Like a Hunger" (2017) (with Amber Mark, as Wilma Archer)
- "Scarecrow" b/w "Cures and Wounds" (2018) (as Wilma Archer)

=== Productions ===
- Jessie Ware - "Something Inside" from Devotion (2012)
- George Maple - "Began to Say" from Vacant Space (2014)
- Celeste - "Ugly Thoughts" from Lately (2019)
- Nilüfer Yanya - "WWAY Health™", “Paralysed", "Experience?", "Warning", "'Sparkle' God Help Me", "The Unordained", and "Give Up Function" from Miss Universe (2019)
- Sudan Archives - "Confessions" and "Glorious" from Athena (2019)
- Bullion - "Loving Furlong" from Heaven is Over (2020)
- Nilüfer Yanya - "Same Damn Luck" from Feeling Lucky? (2020)
- Nilüfer Yanya - "The Dealer", "Shameless", "Stabilise", "Chase Me", "Midnight Sun", "Trouble", "Try", "Company" from Painless (2022)
- Nilüfer Yanya - My Method Actor (2024)

=== Remixes ===
- Lianne La Havas - "Lost & Found (Slime Remix)" (2012)
