= The BPM =

Studio album by Sudan Archives
- Released: October 17, 2025
- Genre: Dance
- Length: 52:37
- Label: Stones Throw
- Producers: Sudan Archives; Ben Dickey; Damon Terrell; Eric Terhune

Sudan Archives chronology
Natural Brown Prom Queen (2022)	The BPM (2025)

Singles from The BPM
- 1. "Dead" Released: June 3, 2025; 2. "My Type" / "Yea Yea Yea" Released: July 16, 2025; 3. "Ms. Pac Man" Released: August 12, 2025; 4. "Come and Find You" Released: September 10, 2025; 5. "A Bug's Life" Released: October 14, 2025

Professional ratings
Aggregate scores
Source	Rating
Metacritic	83/100
Review scores
Source	Rating
AllMusic	4/5 stars
Beats Per Minute	83%
Clash	8/10
Exclaim!	8/10
Mojo	4/5 stars
musicOMH	4.5/5 stars
Paste	8.1/10
Pitchfork	8.4/10
The Skinny	4/5 stars
Slant Magazine	4/5 stars

The BPM is the third studio album by American singer, songwriter and violinist Brittney Parks under her stage name Sudan Archives. It was released on October 17, 2025, through Stones Throw Records.

The album follows her critically acclaimed 2022 release Natural Brown Prom Queen and is said to blend club sounds from Detroit and Chicago with diverse dance styles. It features close collaborators and explores themes of technology, self-exploration and emotion.

== Background and themes ==
The BPM was inspired by Parks's parents' roots in Michigan and Illinois, with recording sessions partially taking place in both Detroit and Chicago, incorporating club sounds from both cities. The album features mainly contributions from her close circle, including her sister, cousin and best friend. It also explores various styles of dance music, such as Jersey club and experimental beatwork. Parks notes that her beats often reflect where her parents come from, but with a more experimental twist on this record. She also expressed her intention to create a definitive dance album with The BPM.

Visually, Parks adopts a new persona called "Gadget Girl", representing her connection with technology. This character embodies being "self-made and self-contained", utilizing the tools around her to become the best version of herself without outside assistance. Parks describes this as "hyper-independence" but ultimately considers it a form of "self-exploration". According to a press release, the album explores themes such as mental illness, self-love, technology, romance and heartbreak.

== Release and promotion ==
The album was preceded by the lead single "Dead" on June 3, 2025, followed by the dual single "My Type" / "Yea Yea Yea" released on July 16. "Ms. Pac Man" was released as a single on August 12, 2025. On September 10, 2025, she released the album's fourth single, "Come and Find You". She released "A Bug's Life" as a single on October 14, 2025. Parks started touring in the United States and Europe in support of the album in fall 2025, and later added more dates for the U.S. for January and February 2026.

== Track listing ==
The BPM track listing
No.	Title	Writer(s)	Producer(s)	Length
1.	"Dead"	Brittney Parks; Ben Dickey; James McCall IV; Eric Terhune	Dickey; Sudan Archives^{[a]}	4:08
2.	"Come and Find You"	B. Parks; Dickey; McCall; Zep Barnasconi; Umesi Michael	Dickey; Sudan Archives; Michael^{[a]}; Barnasconi^{[a]}	3:50
3.	"Yea Yea Yea"	B. Parks; Dickey; McCall; Taylor Henderson; Terhune; Damon Terrell	Dickey; Terhune; Terrell	3:15
4.	"Touch Me"	B. Parks; Dickey; McCall; Terrell	Dickey; Terrell	2:10
5.	"A Bug's Life"	B. Parks; Dickey; McCall; Terhune	Dickey; McCall^{[c]}; Sudan Archives^{[a]}; Terhune^{[a]}	3:07
6.	"The Nature of Power"	B. Parks; Dickey; McCall; Terhune	Dickey; Terhune; Sudan Archives^{[a]}	4:09
7.	"My Type"	B. Parks; Dickey; McCall; Terhune; Terrell; Ghalani of Greenwood	Dickey; Terhune; McCall^{[c]}	3:08
8.	"She's Got Pain"	B. Parks; Dickey; McCall; Terrell	Dickey; Terrell; Sudan Archives	3:24
9.	"David & Goliath"	B. Parks; Dickey; McCall; Catherine Parks	Dickey; Sudan Archives	3:52
10.	"A Computer Love"	B. Parks; Dickey	Dickey; Sudan Archives	3:51
11.	"The BPM"	B. Parks; Dickey; McCall	Dickey; Sudan Archives; McCall^{[c]}	2:30
12.	"Ms. Pac Man"	B. Parks; Dickey; McCall; Terhune; Terrell; Henderson	Dickey; Terhune; McCall^{[c]}; Terrell^{[a]}	3:04
13.	"Los Cinci"	B. Parks; Dickey; McCall; C. Parks; Muhammad Ahmad Hassan	Dickey; Sudan Archives	1:52
14.	"Noire"	Parks; Dickey; Terhune; Greenwood	Dickey; Terhune	5:45
15.	"Heaven Knows"	Parks; Dickey; McCall; Terhune; Dexter Story	Dickey; Sudan Archives	4:32
Total length:				52:37

=== Notes ===
- ^{^[c]} indicates a co-producer
- ^{^[a]} indicates an additional producer

== Personnel ==
Credits adapted from the album's liner notes.

=== Musicians ===
- Sudan Archives – vocals (all tracks), violin (tracks 1–3, 5–11, 13, 14), bass (1, 2, 10, 13), drum programming (1, 2, 13), synthesizer (5, 6, 8–11), sound effects (8–11, 13, 15), drums (9–11), backing vocals (15)
- Ben Dickey – drum programming (1–3, 6, 13), sound effects (1, 2, 5, 7–13, 15),synthesizer (1, 2, 6, 7, 8, 10, 11, 14, 15), bass (2, 3, 6, 8–11, 13, 14), drums (5, 7–11, 14, 15), keyboards (5, 6), chops (11), piano (14), percussion (15)
- Eric Terhune – drum programming (1–4, 6), synthesizer (1, 2, 6, 12, 14), sound effects (1, 2, 12), bass (2–6, 12, 14), keyboards (3, 4), drums (5, 7, 12, 14, 15), percussion (15)
- D-Composed – ensemble (1, 3, 5, 6, 8, 9, 11, 13, 14)
  - Caitlin Edwards – violin
  - Anya Brumfield – violin
  - Wilfred Farquaharson – viola
  - Tahirah Whittington – cello
- Ghalani of Greenwood – synthesizer (2), bass (7), Moog (14)
- Kafari – keyboards (2), bones (8), synthesizer (13)
- Umesi Michael – drum programming (2)
- Zep Barnasconi – live drums (2)
- Richard Lawrence – keyboards (2)
- Damon Terrell – bass, keyboards (3, 4, 8); drum programming (3), drums (4, 8), sound effects (12)
- James McCall IV – vocals (6)
- Dexter Story – bass (11, 15); backing vocals, drums, percussion, synthesizer, bass, piano, flute (15)

=== Technical and visuals ===
- Red Charon – engineering (1–14)
- Jeremy Zumo Kollie – engineering (1–11, 13–15)
- Brian Deck – engineering (1, 3, 5, 6, 8–11)
- Ghalani of Greenwood – engineering (7)
- Adam Kobylarz – live drum engineering (2)
- Noah Glassman – mixing
- Joe LaPorta – mastering
- Christie Dawson – project coordination
- Maya Kalev – project management
- Ben Zucker – string transcription
- Alexa Carrasco – creative direction
- Yanran Xiong – photography
- Louis Moss – design
- Midnightt – design
- Tom Noon – design

== Charts ==
Chart performance for The BPM
Chart (2025)	Peak position
UK Album Downloads (Official Charts)	94
UK Dance Albums (Official Charts)	5
UK Independent Albums (Official Charts)	50
