= Los Retros =

Indie rock band formed in 2017

- Also known as: Retrospect (formerly)
- Origin: Oxnard, California, U.S.
- Genres: Indie pop; indie rock; bedroom pop
- Years active: 2017- 2026
- Label: Stones Throw
- Members: Maurisio Tapia
- Past members: Chaisson Nuusolia Brayan Tapia Lupe

Los Retros was an American indie rock band formed in Oxnard, California, in 2017. The band was founded by frontman Maurisio "Mauri" Tapia. Mauri usually played all of the instruments on his recordings. They are most known for the viral singles, "Someone to Spend Time With", and "Amtrak".

Tapia's project is effectively inactive since October 2026, due to him being charged with four felonies of unlawful acts with a child under the age of ten. He will currently be held in Ventura County jail.

== History ==
Los Retros started out as a trio back in 2017, originally named Retrospect, the original lineup was Maurisio Tapia, Chaisson Nuusolia, and Brayan. They eventually changed the name of the band, because there was already a band by the same name. The track "Someone To Spend Time With", which was the first piece of music material they did with the imprint Stones Throw, gave Los Retros a rise in popularity, and soon after, they were touring with the musician Cuco.

In the same year of the single being released, Los Retros released the Retrospect EP, (Note: Not to get confused with the Retrospect album that released in 2017.) and released two singles from the EP, "Friends", and "Never Have Enough". Six months later, Los Retros produced for Sudan Archives' the critically acclaimed debut album Athena, specifically the song "Stuck". In 2021, Los Retros released the Looking Back EP, which featured songs from the first album Retrospect, and some new material added in. For this release, it came with a color vinyl. The EP also came with 2 singles, "Amtrak", and "It's Got To Be You". On September 18, 2024, "Someone to Spend Time With" was rewarded an RIAA gold certification for 500,000 certified units.

On September 8, they released the single "Solo Tu", a song inspired by the sounds of 1970s Mexican romantic ballads. Los Retros also contributed a feature on HITOMITOI's song "Before You Go" in 2025. After years of inactivity, Los Retros released another single, "Doves", on August 14, 2025, with a feature from Japanese singer Hikari. On December 12, Stones Throw released the compilation album, "Early Days (2016-2019)", which featured 15 unreleased tracks recorded in his parents living room.

Since the release of the single, "Doves", Mauri decided to change genres to Japanese city pop. This is shown on his album "Odisea", released on April 3, 2026, which is his full-length debut album. In the album, he combines jazz, R&B, and Latin American soft rock, and city pop. It also includes the single "Doves" and a new song called "爆ぜるもの", which features Japanese artist HITOMITOI, respectively. On April 19, 2026, Los Retros performed at Coachella for the first time.

In October 2026, Tapia was charged with four felony counts of unlawful acts with a child under the age of ten, following his arrest on October 8. He was held in Ventura County jail on $3 million bail. His arraignment was continued to October 22. On October 15, Stones Throw Records announced that it was taking steps to sever ties with Tapia and his work. However, Los Retros releases still appear on Stones Throw's digital platforms as of October 18, despite direct control over those platforms. His appearance at the label's Stones Throw 30 anniversary festival had previously been cancelled; the label stated that the cancellation preceded its knowledge of the allegations.

== Musical style ==
In most publications, Los Retros took influences from old, 1970s Latino artists, like Jeanette and Los Ángeles Negros. The name of the band, "Los Retros", also took influence from Los Angeles Negros. In an interview with Ones to Watch, Mauri says,

One thing that stuck to my mind was, [what] my parents would play, which was like, Spanish rock, from like the, 70's, and now, I just so now happen to really like those tunes, and realize, I guess my maturity somehow kicked in, and I tend to make tunes just like those.

Mauri has also cited the Yellowjackets, musician Tonetta and other jazz acts as inspiration for his music.

== Band members ==
=== Current members ===
- Maurisio Tapia, guitar, vocals, keyboard, bass, drums (2017–2026)

=== Former members ===
- Chaisson Nuusolia, bass, guitar (2017–2022)
- Brayan, drums (2017-unknown date)
- Lupe, keyboard (2019-unknown date)

== Discography ==
=== Albums ===
- Retrospect (2017, Bandcamp)
- Looking Back (2021)
- Odisea (2026)

=== EP's ===
- Retrospect (2019)
- Everlasting (2020)

As Retro

- 12etro (2019)

=== Compilation albums ===
- Early Days (2016–2019) (2026)
