= Blaze (2018 film) =

- Theatrical release poster
- Directed by: Ethan Hawke
- Screenplay by: Ethan Hawke; Sybil Rosen
- Based on: Living in the Woods in a Tree: Remembering Blaze Foley by Sybil Rosen
- Produced by: Ethan Hawke; Ryan Hawke; Jake Seal; John Sloss
- Starring: Ben Dickey; Alia Shawkat; Sam Rockwell; Steve Zahn; Kris Kristofferson; Richard Linklater
- Cinematography: Steve Cosens
- Edited by: Jason Gourson
- Distributed by: IFC Films
- Release dates: January 21, 2018 (Sundance); August 17, 2018 (United States)
- Running time: 127 minutes
- Country: United States
- Language: English
- Box office: $680,058

Blaze is a 2018 American biographical drama film directed by Ethan Hawke based on the life of country musician Blaze Foley. The screenplay by Hawke and Sybil Rosen was adapted from the memoir Living in the Woods in a Tree: Remembering Blaze Foley by Rosen. It stars musician Ben Dickey as Foley. The film premiered at the 2018 Sundance Film Festival and was released in the United States on August 17, 2018, by IFC Films.

This was Kris Kristofferson's final film appearance before his retirement and death.

== Plot ==
The movie shows scenes of Foley's life and career, interspersed between two of Foley's friends being interviewed on the radio and his final performance and recording.

== Cast ==
- Ben Dickey as Blaze Foley
- Alia Shawkat as Sybil Rosen, Blaze's lover
- Charlie Sexton as Townes Van Zandt, one of Blaze's two friends
- Josh Hamilton as Zee, one of Blaze's two friends
- Kris Kristofferson as Edwin Fuller, Blaze and Marsha's father
- Sam Rockwell as Oilman #1
- Steve Zahn as Oilman #2
- Richard Linklater as Oilman #3
- Sybil Rosen as Mrs. Rosen, Sybil's mother
- Alynda Lee Segarra as Marsha Fuller, Blaze's sister
- James Ourso as Pool Player #2
- David Kallaway as Dennis
- Ritchie Montgomery as T.J.
- Wyatt Russell as Glyn
- Jenn Lyon as Cinnamon
- Martin Bats Bradford as Barry
- Ethan Hawke as a Radio DJ

== Production ==
Principal photography took place in and around ORWO Studios in East Feliciana, Louisiana and a small amount of photography in Mississippi in early 2017.

== Reception ==
On review aggregator website Rotten Tomatoes, the film holds an approval rating of 95% based on 91 reviews, and an average rating of 7.8/10. The website's critics consensus reads: "As lyrical and bittersweet as the music its subject left behind, Blaze takes a decidedly unconventional -- yet richly rewarding -- approach to the musical biopic." On Metacritic, the film has a weighted average score of 75 out of 100, based on 29 critics, indicating "generally favorable" reviews.

On RogerEbert.com, Nick Allen raved that the film is "hands down the best movie of its kind since Inside Llewyn Davis" and added "This movie is all Foley, and the confidence in his words proves incredibly rewarding for Hawke as a cinematic storyteller himself."
