= My Method Actor =

Studio album by Nilüfer Yanya
- Released: 13 September 2024
- Studio: Echo Zoo
- Length: 44:13
- Label: Ninja Tune
- Producer: Will Archer

Nilüfer Yanya chronology
| Painless (2022) | My Method Actor (2024) | Dancing Shoes (2025) |

Singles from My Method Actor
- 1. "Like I Say (I Runaway)" Released: 24 April 2024; 2. "Method Actor" Released: 10 June 2024; 3. "Call It Love" Released: 10 July 2024; 4. "Mutations" Released: 14 August 2024; 5. "Made Out Of Memory" Released: 2 September 2024; 6. "Just A Western" Released: 10 September 2024

My Method Actor is the third studio album by English singer Nilüfer Yanya, released on 13 September 2024 through Ninja Tune. It is Yanya's first album on the label, and follows her 2022 album Painless. The album was preceded by the singles "Like I Say (I Runaway)", "Method Actor", "Call It Love", "Mutations", "Made Out Of Memory", and "Just A Western".

== Background and recording ==
Yanya worked on the album with the producer Wilma Archer, and wrote and recorded it in London, Eastbourne, and Wales. Yanya called the album the "most intense [...] in that respect. Because it's only been us two. We didn't let anyone else into the bubble." The album centres on the theme of "entering a transition between one part of life into another".

== Critical reception ==
Professional ratings
Aggregate scores
| Source | Rating |
|---|---|
| AnyDecentMusic? | 8.1/10 |
| Metacritic | 85/100 |
Review scores
| Source | Rating |
| AllMusic | 4/5 stars |
| Clash | 8/10 |
| Exclaim! | 8/10 |
| The Line of Best Fit | 8/10 |
| MusicOMH | 4/5 stars |
| NME | 4/5 stars |
| Pitchfork | 8.5/10 |
| The Skinny | 4/5 stars |
| Uncut | 8/10 |
| Under the Radar | 9/10 |

My Method Actor was met with widespread acclaim reviews from critics. Matthew Schnipper of Pitchfork notes "On her third and best album, My Method Actor, she’s matured, found herself, chilled out—whatever you want to call it, it’s made her music more triumphant, less nervous. It’s an album that has the feel of everyday luxury, a collection of songs so assured that they feel like they always existed, and Yanya simply plucked them out of the air to give to you." John Amen of The Line of Best Fit wrote, "If Painless exudes the magic of an artist discovering new plateaus, My Method Actor is a refinement of those now integrated proclivities".

=== Year-end lists ===
Select year-end rankings for My Method Actor
| Publication/critic | Accolade | Rank | Ref. |
|---|---|---|---|
| Exclaim! | 50 Best Albums of 2024 | 14 | |
| Uncut | 80 Best Albums of 2024 | 55 | |
| Pitchfork | The 50 Best Albums of 2024 | 13 | |
| Under the Radar | Top 100 Albums of 2024 | 2 | |

== Track listing ==
All tracks are written by Nilüfer Yanya and Will Archer.

My Method Actor track listing
| No. | Title | Length |
|---|---|---|
| 1. | "Keep on Dancing" | 2:08 |
| 2. | "Like I Say (I Runaway)" | 2:57 |
| 3. | "Method Actor" | 3:51 |
| 4. | "Binding" | 5:16 |
| 5. | "Mutations" | 4:16 |
| 6. | "Ready for Sun (Touch)" | 5:33 |
| 7. | "Call It Love" | 4:53 |
| 8. | "Faith's Late" | 4:49 |
| 9. | "Made Out of Memory" | 3:34 |
| 10. | "Just a Western" | 4:29 |
| 11. | "Wingspan" | 2:27 |
| Total length: | | 44:13 |

== Personnel ==
Credits adapted from the album's liner notes.

- Nilüfer Yanya – lead vocals, design
- Will Archer – production, electric guitar (all tracks); acoustic guitar (tracks 1–7), programming (1, 4), keyboards (1, 9), bass guitar (2, 3), backing vocals (2, 6–8, 10, 11), piano (3, 4, 6, 7), baritone guitar (3, 5), drums (5–7, 9, 10), synthesizer (7, 9), classical guitar (8, 10), field recording (11)
- Matt Colton – mastering, lacquer cut
- Nathan Boddy – mixing
- Ellis Dupuy – drums (track 3)
- Joe Harvey-Whyte – pedal steel guitar (tracks 3–5, 9)
- Clíona Ní Choileáin – cello (tracks 5, 7)
- Dave Lynch – additional vocal engineering (tracks 1–9), drum engineering (3)
- Molly Daniel – photography
- Polly Mercher – make-up, hair
- Tess Herbet – styling
- Jenna Coombs – set styling

== Charts ==
Chart performance for My Method Actor
| Chart (2024) | Peak position |
|---|---|
| Belgian Albums (Ultratop Flanders) | 109 |
| Scottish Albums (OCC) | 11 |
| UK Albums (OCC) | 53 |
| UK Independent Albums (OCC) | 1 |
