= True That =

true that

Studio album by Michael Cera
- Released: 8 August 2014
- Genre: Lo-fi; instrumental; indie folk
- Length: 49:55; 39:34 (streaming only)
- Label: Self-released (via Bandcamp)

True That (stylized in all lowercase) is the debut album by Canadian actor and musician Michael Cera. It was self-released on 8 August 2014, via Bandcamp, and recorded and mixed by Cera.

== Reception ==
Professional ratings
Review scores
Source	Rating
The Daily Beast	(favorable)
Vulture	(favorable)
7BitArcade	(favorable)

The album has garnered positive reviews from music critics, with many comparing it to the work of Elliott Smith and other indie folk artists. However, some critics have expressed reservations about the album's length across 21 tracks. Amy Zimmerman of The Daily Beast gave the album a positive review, stating "a mix of instrumental tracks, lovely ballads and solemn covers, true that is music to make sweet love to. The sound is all melancholy, alternative, and adorable". On the other hand, Zimmerman felt that the album seemed "almost infinite" due to its full length of over 50 minutes. Vulture.com's Jesse David Fox cited the album's "pleasant instrumentals"; he compared the overall effect to the works of Cass McCombs, Jason Schwartzman's band Coconut Records, and Elliott Smith, as well as Paul and Linda McCartney's first album, Ram. 7BitArcade's Aaron Kent praised Cera's "wistful vocals", describing them "a broken Elliott Smith trying to channel Beck". Chris DeVille of Stereogum called true that "a charming listen", adding that "[i]ts lo-fi folk songs and jazzy piano ditties remind me—in spirit, at least—of Badly Drawn Boy’s threadbare debut The Hour of Bewilderbeast".

Ryan Reed of Rolling Stone chose "Too Much", "2048" and "Clay Pigeons" as three of the album's highlights.

== Track listing ==
All tracks are written by Michael Cera, except where noted.

No.	Title	Writer(s)	Length
1.	"Uhohtrouble"		0:48
2.	"Moving In"		1:48
3.	"Clay Pigeons" (Blaze Foley cover)	Michael David Fuller	3:06
4.	"What Gives (...I Can't Live Like This)"		1:05
5.	"Of a Thursday"		3:26
6.	"Too Much"		3:05
7.	"Steady Now"		2:00
8.	"Gershy's Kiss"		2:47
9.	"Humdrummin"		0:46
10.	"2048"		1:34
11.	"Ruth"		5:16
12.	"Old Grey Whistle"		1:26
13.	"Brat"		2:00
14.	"OhNadine (You Were in My Dream)"		2:32
15.	"Sexy Danger"		1:00
16.	"Kettle"		3:10
17.	"Smoke Eyes"		0:54
18.	"Those Days"		2:44
Total length:			39:34

Purchase exclusive tracks
No.	Title	Writer(s)	Length
19.	"Play It Again" (Roderick Falconer cover)	Roderick Littleton Taylor	4:07
20.	"Cher Holders"		1:08
21.	"Silent Struggle (I Was Blind)"		5:36
Total length:			50:25

== Personnel ==
- Michael Cera – acoustic and electric guitars, piano, vocals, bass, keyboards, drums, percussion, production, engineering, mixing
