= M T Hadley =

English producer and songwriter

M. T. Hadley
- Born: Martin Terence Hadley
- Origin: London, England, United Kingdom
- Genres: Pop; electronic
- Occupations: Producer, songwriter, performer
- Years active: 2016-present
- Labels: Empty, PIAS Recordings

Martin Terence Hadley, better known as M. T. Hadley, is an English vocalist, producer, and songwriter. Crack Magazine identified his style between electronica, indie and soul, which are ultimately combined into a "sense of deliberate pomposity and pessimism" with off-kilter but 'beautiful' ballads.

He has collaborated with the likes of Frank Ocean producer Vegyn, Tobias Jesso Jr, The Paul Institute, Koreless and Bullion, and has written songs for artists Nilufer Yanya and Metronomy.

== Career ==
His debut album 'Empty' was released in November 2019 receiving favourable reviews, including a 10/10 from The Line Of Best Fit music website.

An EP, 'There Isn't A Window That I Won't Look Out Of' was released in November 2020. It was accompanied by the single 'Suddenly' and lead track 'You Know When To Laugh', a track for which Hadley and filmmaker Jacek Zmarz made three videos shot in Syon Park, West London. The Guardian said the release is "classic British songcraft; sober, sad and revelatory in its simplicity", Gigwise called it an 'instant classic' and The Sunday Times named him their Breaking Act of the Week.

Raised in Stoke Newington, London, Hadley first started recording songs in 2011 but only started taking music seriously after 2013 when his mother died. Her death has been cited as a major influence on much of his output since and his song 'Janet' was written about his experiences with grief.

The single was released through his own label Empty in 2016 and was added to Frank Ocean's playlist for Apple's BEATS radio station, BLONDED, leading to much wider attention in his work. He has received cosigns from the likes of Frank Ocean and Jai Paul. In July 2019 Hadley performed with The Paul Institute at West London's Lay Low venue.

== Discography ==
Studio albums

- Empty (Empty under license to PIAS, 2019)

EP

- There Isn't A Window That I Won't Look Out Of (Empty, 2020)

Singles

- Suddenly (Empty, 2020)
- Janet (Empty, 2016)
- Funes (Empty, 2015)
- It Hurts (Empty, 2015)
