= Miss Universe (album) =

Studio album by Nilüfer Yanya
- Released: 22 March 2019
- Recorded: January 2016 – October 2018
- Studios: Press Play (London); Grow (London); Riverfish (Penzance, Cornwall); Studios in Los Angeles
- Genres: Indie rock; soul; pop-rock; alternative rock
- Length: 52:57
- Label: ATO
- Producers: Wilma Archer; Oli Barton-Wood; John Congleton; MT Hadley; Jazzi Bobbi; Bastian Laengbaek; Lucy Lu; Dave Okumu

Nilüfer Yanya chronology
Do You Like Pain? (2018)	Miss Universe (2019)	Feeling Lucky? (2020)

Miss Universe is the debut studio album by the English indie rock singer Nilüfer Yanya, released on 22 March 2019 by ATO Records.

== Background and composition ==
Miss Universe is Nilüfer Yanya's first full-length album. Yanya eschewed using any of her material from previous EPs, choosing instead to write an album using entirely new material, although some of the songs, such as "Monsters Under the Bed", had been written long beforehand.

The album is interspersed with interludes featuring messages from "WWAY Health", voiced by Yanya, which are short monologues in the form of automated phone messages that intimate an alienating healthcare bureaucracy, with sparse ethereal sounds in the background.

== Critical reception ==
Professional ratings
Aggregate scores
Source	Rating
AnyDecentMusic?	7.8/10
Metacritic	85/100
Review scores
Source	Rating
AllMusic	4/5 stars
Clash	9/10
The Guardian	4/5 stars
The Independent	4/5 stars
Mojo	4/5 stars
NME	4/5 stars
The Observer	4/5 stars
Pitchfork	8.3/10
Q	4/5 stars
Uncut	8/10

Miss Universe received wide critical acclaim on its release, with critics noting Yanya's ability to bounce back and forth between musical and lyrical styles, shifting between "gimlet-eyed composure and cataclysmic panic". The album was described as nervous and restless, combining influences from indie rock to soul, jazz, and trip hop. A Stereogum review called Yanya's voice "malleable and endlessly expressive", and described the song compositions as "minimal and instinctual". Pitchfork ranked the album as one of the best of 2019 in their year end review.

== Track listing ==
No.	Title	Writer(s)	Producer(s)	Length
1.	"WWAY Health™"	Nilüfer Yanya; Wilma Archer	Archer	0:59
2.	"In Your Head"	Yanya; John Congleton	Congleton	3:28
3.	"Paralysed"	Yanya; Archer	Archer	4:26
4.	"Angels"	Yanya; Joe Dworniak	Oli Barton-Wood	3:56
5.	"Experience?"	Yanya; Archer	Archer	1:07
6.	"Paradise"	Yanya; Dworniak	Barton-Wood	3:58
7.	"Baby Blu"	Yanya; Bastian Laengbaek	Laengbaek	4:41
8.	"Warning"	Yanya; Archer	Archer	0:21
9.	"Heat Rises"	Yanya; Dave Okumu	Okumu	3:26
10.	"Melt"	Yanya; Barton-Wood	Barton-Wood	4:23
11.	""Sparkle" God Help Me"	Yanya; Archer	Archer	1:32
12.	"Safety Net"	Yanya; MT Hadley	Hadley	4:33
13.	"Tears"	Yanya; Barton-Wood	Barton-Wood	3:16
14.	"Monsters Under the Bed"	Yanya	Congleton	4:13
15.	"The Unordained"	Yanya	Archer	3:22
16.	"Give Up Function"	Yanya; Archer	Archer	0:41
17.	"Heavyweight Champion of the Year"	Yanya	Jazzi Bobbi; Lucy Lu	4:42
Total length:				52:57

Notes

- Track 1 is stylised as "WWAY HEALTH™"
- Track 11 is stylised as ""Sparkle" GOD HELP ME"

== Personnel ==
Musicians

- Nilüfer Yanya – vocals, guitar (2–4, 6, 7, 10, 12–15, 17), keyboards (6, 10, 13), piano (4)
- Adam Pickrell – keyboards (2, 14)
- Wilma Archer – instrumentation (1, 3, 5, 8, 11, 15, 16), guitar (3, 15), bass guitar (3, 15), drums (3, 15)
- John Congleton – drum and bass programming (2, 14)
- Joey Waronker – drums (2, 14)
- Jake Long – drums (4)
- Oli Barton-Wood – keyboards (6, 10)
- Jazzi Bobbi – saxophone (6, 10, 17), backing vocals (17), keyboards (17), programming (17)
- Ellis Dupuy – drums (6, 10, 13, 17)
- Bastian Laengbaek – piano (7)
- Dave Okumu – guitar (9), instrumentation (9), vocals (9)
- MT Hadley – instrumentation (12), programming (12)
- Hal Robinson – bass guitar (13)
- Lucy Lu – bass guitar (17)

Technical personnel

- Wilma Archer – recording (1, 3, 5, 8, 11, 15, 16)
- John Congleton – recording (2, 14)
- Oli Barton-Wood – recording (4, 6, 10, 13)
- Bastian Laengbaek – recording (7)
- Dave Okumu – recording (9)
- MT Hadley – recording (12)
- Jazzi Bobbi – recording (17)
- Lucy Lu – recording (17)
- Andy Ramsay – recording (17)
- Nathan Boddy – recording (vocals on 3, 7, 9, 12, 15; pianos and guitars on 7), mixing, additional production
- Matt Colton – mastering
- Molly Daniel – photography

== Charts ==
Chart performance for Miss Universe
Chart (2019)	Peak position
Belgian Albums (Ultratop Flanders)	160
