= Michael Cera =

Canadian actor (born 1988)

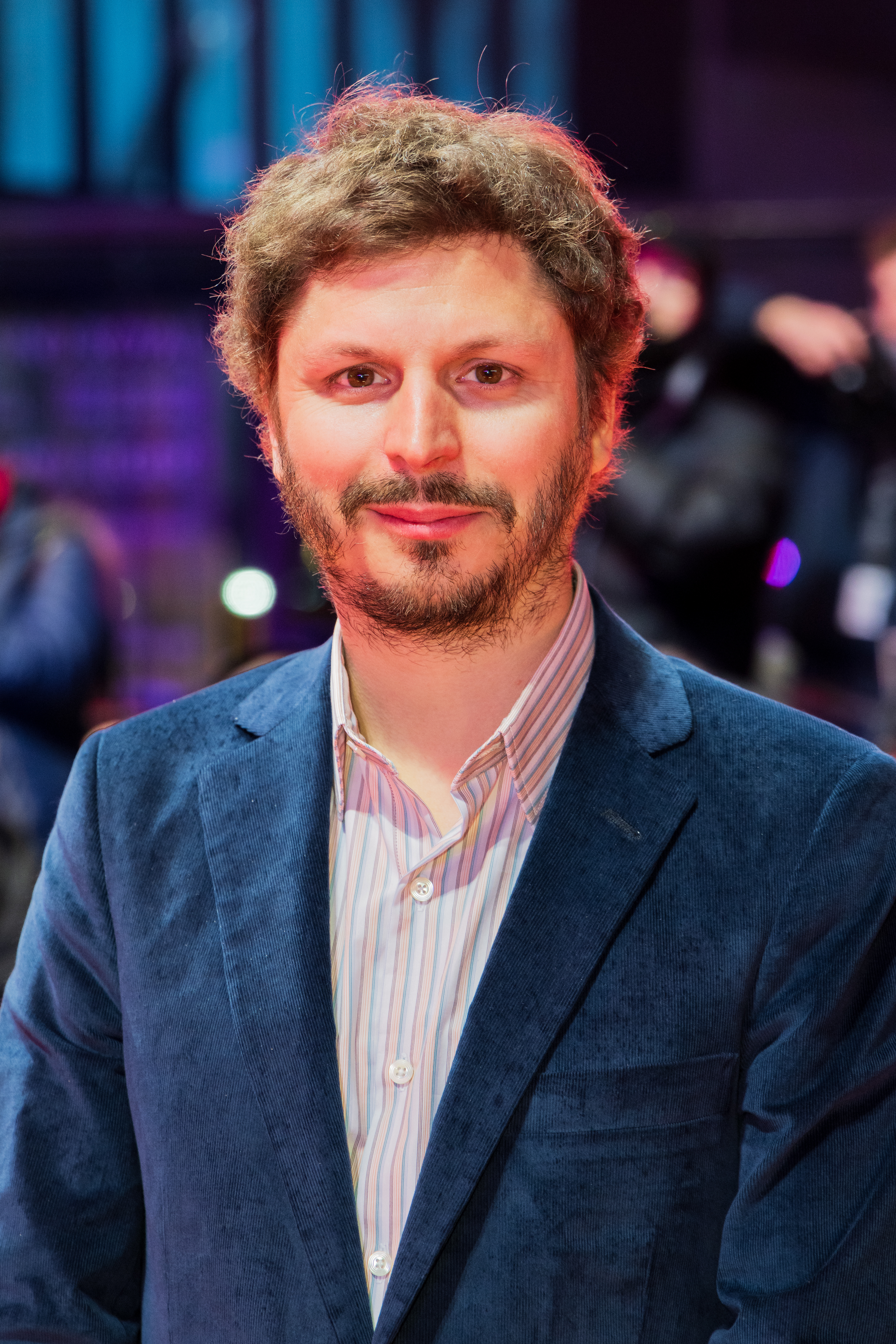
- Cera in 2023
- Born: Michael Austin Cera; June 7, 1988 (age 38); Brampton, Ontario, Canada
- Years active: 1999–present
- Spouse: Nadine
- Children: 2
- Musical career
- Genres: Lo-fi; indie folk
- Occupations: Actor; comedian; musician
- Instruments: Vocals; bass
- Website: michaelceramusic.bandcamp.com

Michael Austin Cera (/ˈsɛrə/ SERR-ə; Italian: [ˈtʃeːra]; born June 7, 1988) is a Canadian actor and musician. Over his career, he has received nominations for a British Academy Film Award, three Critics' Choice Movie Awards, four Screen Actors Guild Awards, and a Tony Award. Cera became known for portraying leading roles in a string of comedic films such as Superbad (2007), Juno (2007), Scott Pilgrim vs. the World (2010), Nick & Norah's Infinite Playlist (2008), and Youth in Revolt (2009). He took supporting roles in both comedies and dramas including Confessions of a Dangerous Mind (2002), This Is the End (2013), Molly's Game (2017), Person to Person (2017), Gloria Bell (2019), Barbie (2023), Dream Scenario (2023) and The Phoenician Scheme (2025). He voiced Dick Grayson / Robin in The Lego Batman Movie (2017).

Cera gained prominence portraying George Michael Bluth in the Fox sitcom Arrested Development (2003–2006; 2013–2019), and took a leading role in the Hulu comedy series Life & Beth (2022–2024). He voiced animated roles including Josh Spitz in Braceface (2001–2004), Brother Bear in The Berenstain Bears (2003–2004), Todd in the Wayside pilot (2005), Barry in Sausage Party (2016) and its Amazon Prime Video sequel series Sausage Party: Foodtopia (2024), Hank in Paws of Fury: The Legend of Hank (2022), and reprising his role as Scott Pilgrim in the Netflix series Scott Pilgrim Takes Off (2023). He is also known for his Broadway performances in the Kenneth Lonergan plays This Is Our Youth in 2014, Lobby Hero in 2018, for which he received a nomination for the Tony Award for Best Featured Actor in a Play, and The Waverly Gallery in 2019. In addition to acting, Cera is a musician, having released his debut album True That in 2014. Cera has also performed as the touring bassist for indie rock supergroup Mister Heavenly.

== Early life ==
Cera was born on June 7, 1988, in Brampton, Ontario, a city in the Greater Toronto Area (GTA). He is the son of Linda (née Cockman) and Luigi Cera, a technician. He is of Sicilian descent through his father. His parents both worked for Xerox. Cera has an older sister, Jordan, and a younger sister, Molly. He became interested in acting after viewing Ghostbusters repeatedly when sick with the chicken pox at the age of three. Cera memorized all the dialogue and idolized Bill Murray. He enrolled in The Second City, Toronto, and took improvisation classes. Cera attended Conestoga Public School, Robert H. Lagerquist Senior Public School, and Heart Lake Secondary School until grade nine. After starting acting, he completed school online through grade twelve.

== Career ==
=== 1999–2007: Child acting and breakthrough ===
His first role was an unpaid appearance in a Tim Hortons summer camp commercial. That appearance eventually landed him a position in a Pillsbury commercial, in which he poked the Pillsbury Doughboy and had his first role with lines.

In 1999, Cera was cast as Larrabe Hicks in the Canadian children's show I Was a Sixth Grade Alien, which ran for two seasons. That year, he also appeared in the television films What Katy Did and Switching Goals, starring the Olsen twins. The next year Cera made his theatrical film debut in the science fiction film Frequency (2000) as the son of Noah Emmerich's character. Cera also appeared in the films Steal This Movie! and Ultimate G's: Zac's Flying Dream in 2000. He had his first leading role in the latter film, which was presented in IMAX theaters. Cera appeared in several television films in 2001, including My Louisiana Sky and The Familiar Stranger. He also began voicing Josh Spitz in the animated series Braceface, which he continued until 2004. In 2002, Cera played the young Chuck Barris (played by Sam Rockwell) in the George Clooney-directed film Confessions of a Dangerous Mind. He provided the voice for Brother Bear – an anthropomorphic bear – in the 2003 The Berenstain Bears animated series, which aired for three seasons. In 2005, Cera voiced Todd in the Wayside pilot movie, based on the Wayside School books.

"Arrested Development never felt safe. Even in the first season, we did thirteen episodes, and we thought we'd never do a back nine. So I never thought in a million years we'd get to make three seasons. I was happy we got that far. I thought it was really good, and I'm really proud of it. I don't think we made a bad episode."

— Michael Cera, Esquire (2009)

He had a role in the critically panned Fox pilot The Grubbs in 2002, which was never aired. But Cera successfully auditioned for a part in another Fox sitcom, Arrested Development. This began airing in November 2003 and ran for three seasons. The show follows the formerly wealthy and dysfunctional Bluth family, with Cera playing George Michael Bluth, the teenage son of character Michael Bluth, played by Jason Bateman. After three seasons, Fox canceled the series in 2006 due to low viewership, although it had received critical acclaim. In 2006, Cera created and starred in a parody of Impossible is Nothing, a video résumé created by Aleksey Vayner. Cera and his Arrested Development co-star Alia Shawkat guest-starred as a pair of college students in the teen noir drama Veronica Mars, in the episode "The Rapes of Graff" in 2006.

=== 2007–2013: Further success and stage debut ===
Along with best friend Clark Duke, Cera wrote and starred in a series of short videos released on their website. Duke originated the idea, as he was enrolled at Loyola Marymount University and used their videos for his film school studies. In 2007, the pair signed a deal with CBS Television to write, produce, direct, and act in a short-form comedy series entitled Clark and Michael. The show featured guest stars such as David Cross, Andy Richter and Patton Oswalt, and was distributed via CBS's internet channel, CBS Innertube.

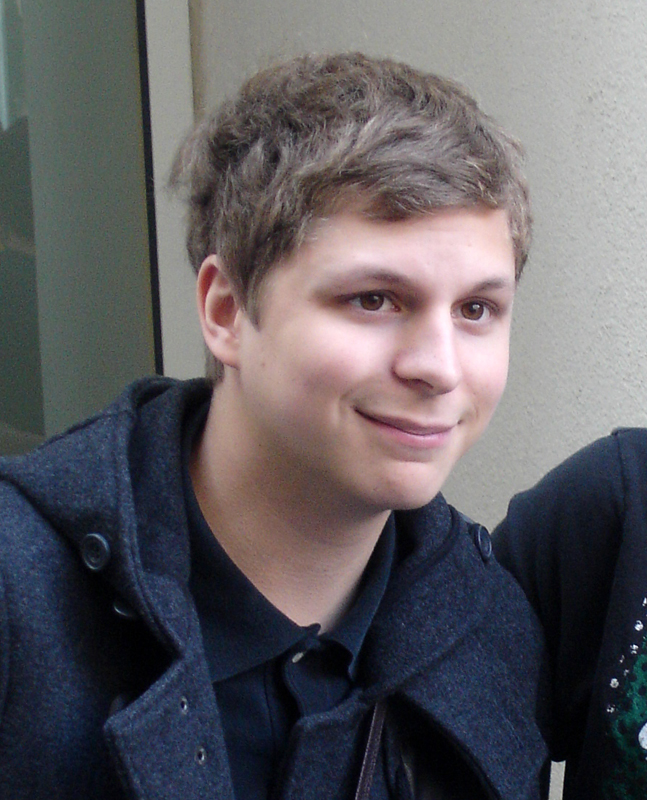
Cera in 2007

In May 2007, Cera appeared in a staged comedy video that shows him being fired from the lead role of the film Knocked Up, after belittling and arguing with its director Judd Apatow, in a scene that mocks the David O. Russell blow up on the set of I Heart Huckabees. Cera starred in the Apatow-produced teen comedy Superbad alongside Jonah Hill. Their characters in the film – two virgin teenagers about to graduate from high school whose party plans go awry – were based on the comedy's writers Seth Rogen and Evan Goldberg. Superbad was released in cinemas in August 2007, topping the US box office for two weeks in a row.

Cera's performance was critically acclaimed: The Atlantic reviewer said that the film "belongs to Michael Cera" for capturing "teenage sexual abashment as indelibly as he did in the role of George Michael [on Arrested Development]." The New York Times said that he was "excellent" and CNN praised Cera and Hill for playing "off each other beautifully".

In November 2007, Cera hosted a live, staged version of Saturday Night Live; it was not broadcast due to the ongoing 2007 Writers Guild of America Strike. In his second film of 2007, Cera co-starred in Juno as Paulie Bleeker, a teenager who has impregnated his long-time school friend Juno (played by Elliot Page). For Superbad and Juno, Cera won Breakthrough Artist in the Austin Film Critics Association Awards 2007, and was included in Entertainment Weekly's "30 Under 30" list in February 2008.

Cera starred alongside Kat Dennings in the romantic comedy-drama Nick & Norah's Infinite Playlist (2008), in which they played two strangers who bond over their shared love of a band and try to find their secret show. He starred in the comedy Extreme Movie (2008), which was composed of vignettes focusing on teen sex. Cera held a recurring role on the comedy series Childrens Hospital from 2008 to 2016 as Sal Viscuso, a hospital staffer who is known only by his voice through an intercom.

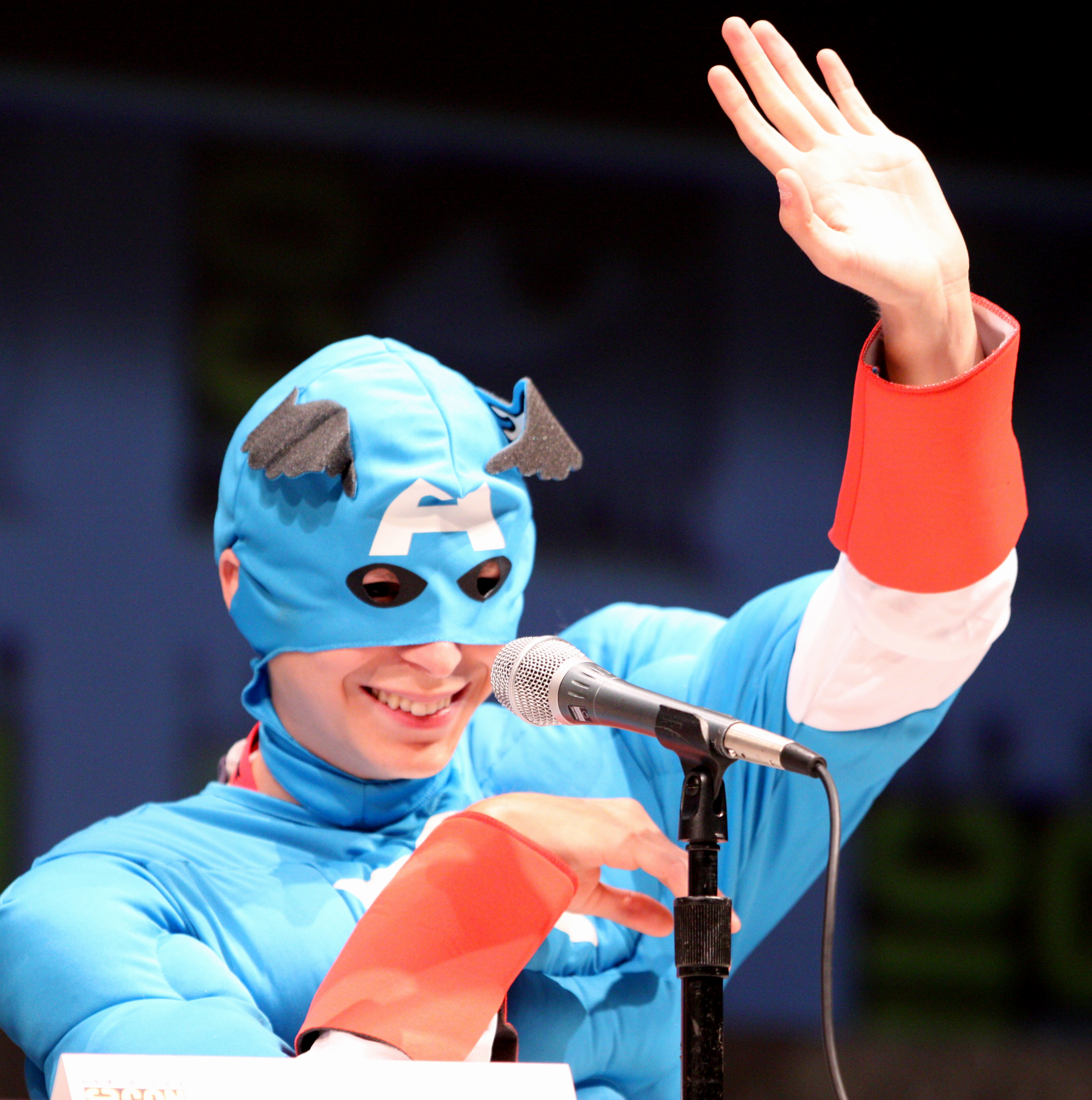
Cera dressed as Captain America to promote Scott Pilgrim vs. the World at the 2010 San Diego Comic-Con

Cera played a fictionalized version of himself in the independent romantic comedy Paper Heart (2009). It explored the fictional relationship between Cera and the film's writer Charlyne Yi, also playing herself. Cera and Yi composed the film's score together. That year Cera starred opposite Jack Black in the comedy Year One, set during the Stone Age. The film, directed by Harold Ramis, was poorly received, although Time magazine critic Mary Pols said that Cera's performance saved the film from being a "catastrophe". In his final film of 2009, Cera starred in Youth in Revolt, an adaptation of the eponymous novel. He played a shy teenager named Nick Twisp who creates a destructive alter ego, François Dillinger, after becoming smitten with a girl, played by Portia Doubleday. Cera had also begun to write. His first published short story, "Pinecone", appeared in McSweeney's Quarterly thirtieth issue in 2009.

Cera was cast as Scott Pilgrim in the film adaptation of the graphic novel series by Bryan Lee O'Malley. The film's director, Edgar Wright, had seen his work in Arrested Development and believed that Cera was an actor "audiences will still follow even when the character is being a bit of an ass." The film, Scott Pilgrim vs. the World, follows Pilgrim, a musician who must battle the seven evil exes of his girlfriend Ramona (played by Mary Elizabeth Winstead). It was released in cinemas in August 2010. It did poorly at the box office, grossing $47.7 million against a production budget of $85–90 million.

Cera made a guest appearance in "The Daughter Also Rises", a 2012 episode of the animated sitcom The Simpsons, as the voice of Nick, a love interest to Lisa Simpson. He made his theater debut in a production of Kenneth Lonergan's play This Is Our Youth in a two-week run during March 2012 at the Sydney Opera House. The play also featured his Scott Pilgrim co-star Kieran Culkin and actress Tavi Gevinson. A Broadway production at the Cort Theater opened in September 2014 and closed in January 2015. The New York Times theater critic Ben Brantley praised Cera for achieving "something remarkable": "the sense of an amorphous being assuming and losing shape in the course of roughly 12 hours". Also in 2012, Cera played a supporting role in the drama The End of Love and appeared in the short film The Immigrant. Arrested Development was revived for a fourth season in 2012 by Netflix, with Cera reprising his role as George Michael Bluth. Cera also worked in the writers' room and served as a consulting producer during its production. The season was released in May 2013.

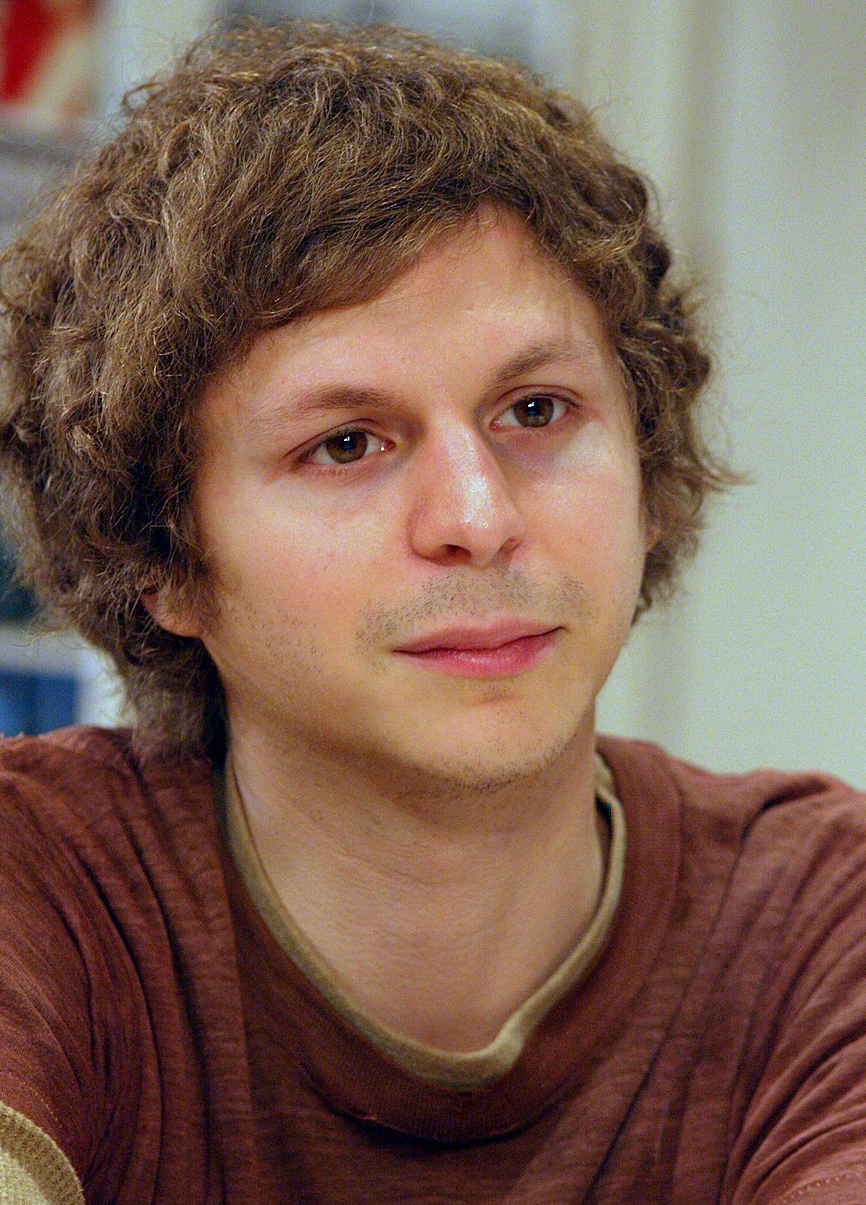
Cera in 2012

Cera collaborated with Chilean filmmaker Sebastián Silva on two films in 2013 – Magic Magic and Crystal Fairy & the Magical Cactus – both of which were filmed in Chile and premiered at the 2013 Sundance Film Festival. He spent "five hours a day learning Spanish" for Magic Magic. Cera was featured most prominently in Crystal Fairy, in which he starred as a self-absorbed man travelling Chile with a woman named "Crystal Fairy" (played by Gaby Hoffmann) while bearing a cactus. Along with Reggie Watts, Tim & Eric, and Sarah Silverman, Cera created the web-based comedy YouTube channel Jash in March 2013, where he has posted short films which he directs and/or stars in. These films include the comedy-drama Gregory Go Boom (2013), in which Cera played a paraplegic man, and his directorial debut Brazzaville Teen-Ager (2013), co-starring Charles Grodin as his sick father. He played an exaggerated version of himself in the apocalyptic comedy film This Is the End, which was released in summer of 2013 and featured his Superbad co-stars Jonah Hill and Seth Rogen. Throughout 2013, Cera also appeared on Burning Love, a web spoof of reality dating competition shows, and on an episode of Drunk History as John Endecott. Cera had previously played Alexander Hamilton in a comedic retelling of Hamilton's duel with Aaron Burr on the show's first episode as a web series in 2008 before it was adapted into a television show.

=== 2013–present ===
Cera appeared in his Arrested Development co-star David Cross' 2014 film Hits, playing a marijuana dealer. He also co-starred alongside John Hawkes and Sally Hawkins in Charlie Kaufman's television pilot How & Why, which was rejected by FX. After a brief, "menacing" appearance in the drama Entertainment (2015), Cera appeared in the prequel to the 2001 comedy film Wet Hot American Summer, the comedy series Wet Hot American Summer: First Day of Camp and in the Christmas musical comedy film A Very Murray Christmas as Bill Murray's fictional talent agent. Cera then voiced a hot dog trying to escape his fate in a supermarket in the animated comedy Sausage Party (2016). In 2015, Cera made a cameo on Louis C.K.'s Louie on FX, in the season five episode "Sleepover" alongside Glenn Close, John Lithgow, and Matthew Broderick.

Cera had five film releases in 2017, the first of which was the animated superhero comedy The Lego Batman Movie, in which he voiced the Batman's sidekick Robin. He played a supporting role as a sleazy car salesman in the comedy How to Be a Latin Lover and co-starred in Janicza Bravo's first full-length feature, the comedy-drama Lemon. He played an actor described as having a "wedge of hair that makes him look like Frédéric Chopin crossed with Eraserhead", by Variety critic Owen Gleiberman. Cera starred opposite Abbi Jacobson in the drama Person to Person, focusing on the struggles of different people over the course of one day in New York City. Cera and Jacobson are featured as a pair of crime reporters investigating a possible murder. In his final film of the year, Aaron Sorkin's crime drama Molly's Game, Cera played a celebrity known only as Player X who participates in a high-stakes, underground poker empire run by Molly Bloom (played by Jessica Chastain). Cera's fictional character in the film was said to be a composite character of celebrity poker players and actors Leonardo DiCaprio, Tobey Maguire and Ben Affleck.

A "giant fan" of director David Lynch, Cera made a guest appearance in the 2017 revival of Lynch and Mark Frost's television show Twin Peaks in the show's fourth episode, as Wally "Brando" Brennan, the son of Deputy Sheriff Andy Brennan and his wife Lucy Brennan. The appearance contained several references to the work of actor Marlon Brando: Wally shares the same birthday and is nicknamed after Brando. Cera returned to the stage in March 2018, starring in a second Kenneth Lonergan production, Lobby Hero, at the Helen Hayes Theatre on Broadway. The play also stars Chris Evans, Brian Tyree Henry and Bel Powley. Cera and Henry were both nominated for Best Featured Actor in a Play at the 72nd Tony Awards. Cera return to Broadway in October 2018, starring in a third Kenneth Lonergan production, a revival of The Waverly Gallery at the John Golden Theatre on Broadway. Cera took a supporting role as a painter acting alongside Elaine May, Lucas Hedges, and Joan Allen.

Cera co-starred in the 2018 film drama Gloria Bell, with Julianne Moore as the title character. Cera returned to his role as George Michael Bluth in the fifth season of Arrested Development in 2018. In 2021, Cera lent his voice to the adult animated film Cryptozoo. Cera appeared in the 2022 animated comedy Paws of Fury: The Legend of Hank about a dog who wishes to become a samurai. In 2023, he starred opposite Margot Robbie and Ryan Gosling in the fantasy comedy film Barbie as Allan. In August 2023, he said in an interview he was working on getting financing to direct his first movie, naming an adaptation of Masters of Atlantis by Charles Portis as one of two possible directorial debuts, having narrowly beaten out Clark Duke when first securing the adaptation rights. In 2025, Cera garnered critical acclaim for his performance as Norwegian entomologist Björn Lund in the Wes Anderson film The Phoenician Scheme, which critic Brian Tallerico deemed "his best work to date".

=== Music ===
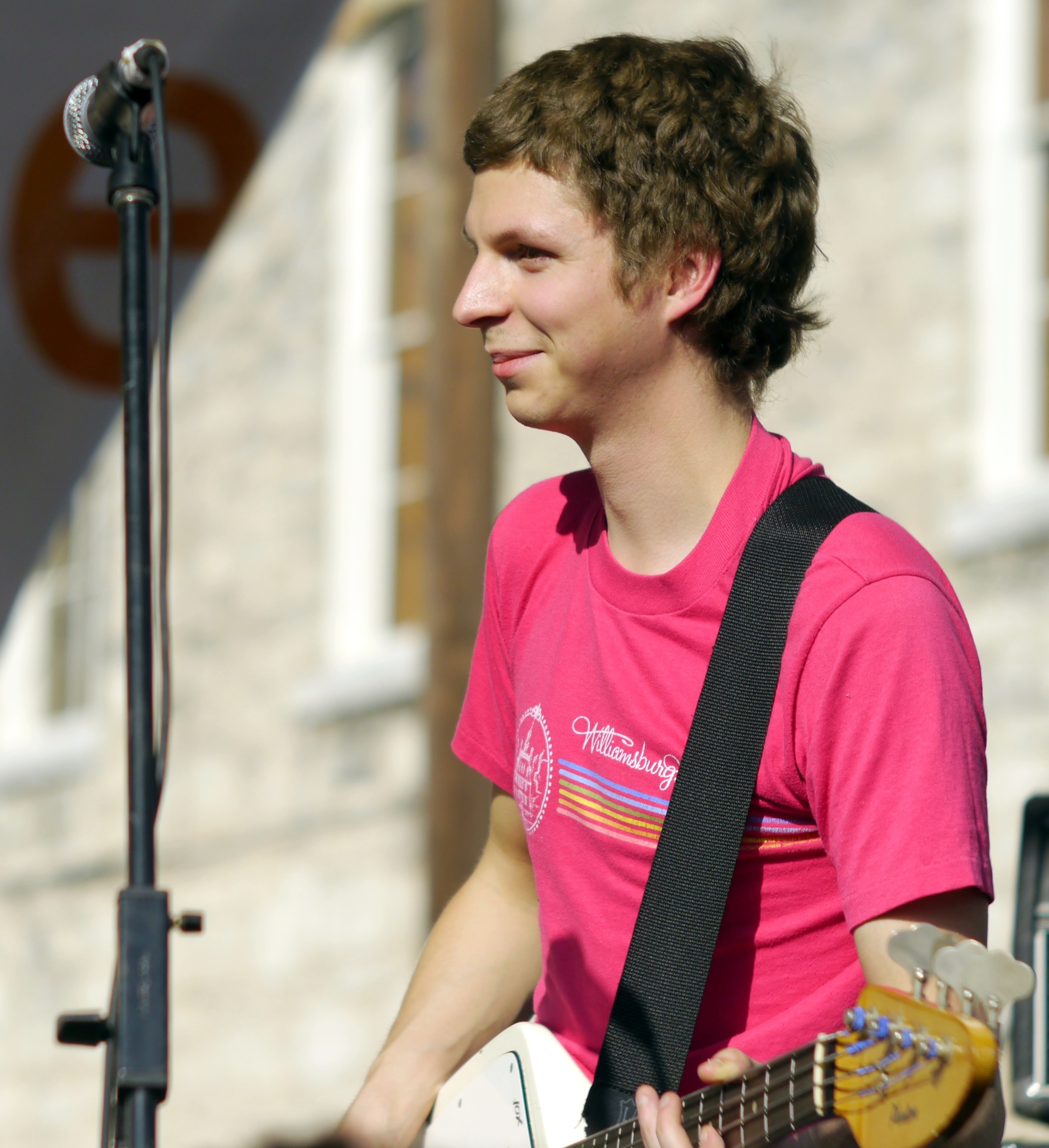
Cera performing in 2011

In 2010, Cera contributed mandolin and backing vocals to the Weezer song "Hang On" from their album Hurley. Cera has also established himself as the touring bass player in Mister Heavenly, an indie rock band originating in the American northwest, and is a member of the band The Long Goodbye, along with Clark Duke. Cera also played bass and sang back up during songs in both Scott Pilgrim vs. the World and Nick and Norah's Infinite Playlist. He released his full-length debut album True That on August 8, 2014, through his official Bandcamp page. The album features 19 original tracks, a cover of Roderick Falconer's "Play It Again" as well as a cover of Blaze Foley's "Clay Pigeons."

In early 2015, Canadian musician Alden Penner released "Meditate", a track from his upcoming EP Canada in Space, which features Cera. Penner subsequently announced that the EP would be released on June 29, 2015, on City Slang records, as well as a European tour of the UK, Netherlands, France, and Germany, which featured Cera as both co-headliner and member of Penner's backing band. The song "Best I Can" from the film Dina, written and performed by Cera and featuring Sharon Van Etten, was nominated for 'Best Song in a Documentary' at the 2017 Critics' Choice Documentary Awards.

== Personal life ==
Cera has been very private about his personal life. In 2016, Aubrey Plaza made public that the pair had dated for about 18 months after filming Scott Pilgrim vs. the World in 2010 and even considered getting married at one point. The two remain friends.

Cera is married to a German woman named Nadine, whom he met at a bar in Paris while on a press tour for Arrested Development. In March 2022, Amy Schumer accidentally revealed that Cera was a father. Later that month, he revealed to Extra that the baby was a six-month-old boy. In a February 2024 appearance on The Tonight Show Starring Jimmy Fallon, Cera announced that he and his wife had a second son. In his Criterion Closet Picks video (posted on May 30, 2025), Cera shared that his "older son is three and a half". As of August 2023, Cera resides in Brooklyn, New York City.

== Filmography ==
=== Film ===
Year	Title	Role	Notes
2000	Frequency	Gordy Hersch Jr. (Age 10)	
2000	Steal This Movie!	America Hoffman (Age 7–8)	
2000	Ultimate G's: Zac's Flying Dream	Young Zac	
2002	Confessions of a Dangerous Mind	Chuck Barris (Age 8–11)	
2007	Superbad	Evan	
2007	Juno	Paulie Bleeker	
2008	Extreme Movie	Fred	
2008	Nick and Norah's Infinite Playlist	Nick O'Leary	
2009	Paper Heart	Himself	
2009	Year One	Oh	
2009	Youth in Revolt	Nick Twisp / François Dillinger	
2010	Scott Pilgrim vs. the Animation	Scott Pilgrim	Short film; voice
2010	Scott Pilgrim vs. the World	Scott Pilgrim	
2012	The End of Love	Michael	
2012	The Immigrant	Michael	Short film
2013	Crystal Fairy & the Magical Cactus	Jamie	
2013	Magic Magic	Brink	Also executive producer
2013	Brazzaville Teen-Ager	Gunther	Short film; also director and writer
2013	Failure	Man	Short film; also director and writer
2013	This Is the End	Himself	
2013	Gregory Go Boom	Gregory	Short film
2013	Bitch	Himself	Short film; also director and writer
2014	Hits	Bennie	
2015	Entertainment	Tommy	
2015	That Dog	Tim	Short film
2015	A Very Murray Christmas	Jackie the Talent Agent	
2016	Sausage Party	Barry	Voice
2016	Man Rots from the Head	Sydney Ward	Short film
2017	Person to Person	Phil	
2017	Lemon	Alex	
2017	The Lego Batman Movie	Richard "Dick" Grayson / Robin	Voice
2017	How to Be a Latin Lover	Remy	
2017	Cooking with Alfred	Richard "Dick" Grayson / Robin	Voice; Short film
2017	Molly's Game	Player X	
2018	Tyrel	Alan	
2018	Spivak	Robby LeBeau	
2018	Gloria Bell	Peter	
2021	Cryptozoo	Matthew	Voice
2022	Paws of Fury: The Legend of Hank	Hank	Voice
2023	The Adults	Eric	
2023	Barbie	Allan	
2023	Dream Scenario	Trent	
2023	Under the Boardwalk	Armen	Voice
2024	Christmas Eve in Miller's Point	Officer Gibson	
2024	Sacramento	Glenn	
2025	The Phoenician Scheme	Bjorn Lund	
2025	The Running Man	Elton Parrakis	
TBA	Love is Not the Answer		Filming; also writer, director, producer

Key
†	Denotes films that have not yet been released

=== Television ===
Year	Title	Role	Notes
1999	Twice in a Lifetime	Skateboarder #2	Episode: "The Blame Game"
1999–2001	I Was a Sixth Grade Alien	Larrabe Hicks	Recurring role
1999	Noddy	Butch	Episode: "Big Bullies"
1999	Switching Goals	Taylor	Television film
1999	What Katy Did	Dorry	Television film
2000	La Femme Nikita	Jerome	Episode: "He Came from Four"
2000	Anne of Green Gables: The Animated Series	Benjamin	Voice; Episode: "The Best Partner"
2001	George Shrinks	Hurlden Cadwell	Voice; Episode: "Speed Shrinks"
2001	Doc	Max	2 episodes
2001	The Ripping Friends	Boy Boy/Young Boy	Voice; 2 episodes
2001	Stolen Miracle	Brandon McKinley	Television film
2001	My Louisiana Sky	Jesse Wade Thompson	Television film
2001	The Familiar Stranger	Young Ted Welsh	Television film
2001	Walter and Henry	Crying Kid	Television film
2001–2004	Braceface	Josh Spitz	Voice; Main role
2001–2002	Pecola	Robbie Rabbit	Voice; Main role
2003–2004	The Berenstain Bears	Brother Bear	Voice; Main role
2003	Rolie Polie Olie	Little Gizmo	Voice; 4 episodes
2003–2006; 2013–2019	Arrested Development	George Michael Bluth	Main role Producer (season 4 and 5)
2005	Wayside: The Movie	Todd	Voice; Television film
2006	Veronica Mars	Dean Rudolph	Episode: "The Rapes of Graff"
2006	Tom Goes to the Mayor	Scrotch	Voice; Episode: "Undercover"
2007	Clark and Michael	Mikey Cera	Also co-creator, director, writer, editor and producer
2007	Tim and Eric Awesome Show, Great Job!	Jamie Stevens	Episode: "Cats"
2008–2016	Childrens Hospital	Sal Viscuso	Voice; Recurring role
2012	The Simpsons	Nick	Voice; Episode: "The Daughter Also Rises"
2012, 2015	Comedy Bang! Bang!	Himself	2 episodes
2013	Arcade Fire in Here Comes the Night Time	Spanish Bartender	Television special
2013	Burning Love	Wally	6 episodes
2013–2016	Drunk History	Various	3 episodes
2014	Saturday Night Live	Surrogate	Episode: "Jonah Hill/Bastille"
2014	How and Why	Mendelsohn	Pilot
2015	Louie	Young Man	Episode: "Sleepover"
2015	Wet Hot American Summer: First Day of Camp	Jim Stansel	3 episodes
2017	Twin Peaks	Wally "Brando" Brennan	Episode: "Part 4"
2018	The Shivering Truth	Delmer	Voice; Episode: "Chaos Beknownst"
2019	Weird City	Tawny	Episode: "A Family"
2020	Medical Police	Sal Viscuso	3 episodes
2020	At Home with Amy Sedaris	Travis	Episode: "Valentine's Day"
2022	The Boys Presents: Diabolical	Great Wide Wonder	Voice; Episode: "I'm Your Pusher"
2022–2024	Life & Beth	John	Main role
2023	Celebrity Jeopardy!	Himself	2 episodes
2023	Black Mirror	Beppe	Episode: "Joan Is Awful"
2023	Command Z	Kerning Fealty	Web series
2023	Praise Petey	Little Einstein	Voice; 2 episodes
2023	Scott Pilgrim Takes Off	Scott Pilgrim	Voice; Main role
2024	Sausage Party: Foodtopia	Barry	Voice
2026	Saturday Night Live UK	Himself	Episode: "Tina Fey/Wet Leg"

=== Theatre ===
Year	Title	Role	Venue	Ref.
2012	This Is Our Youth	Warren Straub	Sydney Opera House	
2014	This Is Our Youth	Warren Straub	Steppenwolf Theatre	
2014	This Is Our Youth	Warren Straub	Cort Theatre	
2018	Lobby Hero	Jeff	Helen Hayes Theatre	
2018	The Waverly Gallery	Don Bowman	John Golden Theatre	

== Discography ==
Studio albums

- True That (2014)

Soundtrack

- Scott Pilgrim vs. the World: Original Motion Picture Soundtrack (2010)

== Bibliography ==
- Cera, Michael (November 25, 2013). "My man Jeremy". Shouts & Murmurs. The New Yorker. Vol. 89, no. 38. pp. 62–67.

== Awards and nominations ==
Year	Nominated work	Award	Category	Result
2002	My Louisiana Sky	Young Artist Award	Supporting Young Actor – Television	Nominated
2004	Arrested Development	TV Land Award	TV Land Future Classic Award	Won
2005	Arrested Development	Screen Actors Guild Award	Outstanding Ensemble in a Comedy Series	Nominated
2006	Arrested Development	Screen Actors Guild Award	Outstanding Ensemble in a Comedy Series	Nominated
2007	Juno	Chicago Film Critics Association	Most Promising Performer	Won
2007	Juno	Austin Film Critics Association	Breakthrough Artist Award	Won
2007	Superbad	Austin Film Critics Association	Breakthrough Artist Award	Won
2008	Superbad	Critics' Choice Movie Awards	Best Young Performer	Nominated
2008	Juno	Critics' Choice Movie Awards	Best Young Performer	Nominated
2008	Juno	Critics' Choice Movie Awards	Best Acting Ensemble	Nominated
2008	Superbad	Canadian Comedy Awards	Best Male Performance	Nominated
2008	Superbad	MTV Movie Awards	Breakthrough Performance	Nominated
2008	Juno	MTV Movie Awards	Best Kiss (Shared with Elliot Page)	Nominated
2008	Juno	MTV Movie Awards	Best Male Performance	Nominated
2008	Nick and Norah's Infinite Playlist	Satellite Awards	Best Actor: Comedy or Musical	Nominated
2008	Superbad	Teen Choice Awards	Choice Movie Actor: Comedy	Nominated
2008	Superbad	Teen Choice Awards	Choice Movie Breakout: Male	Nominated
2008	Juno	Teen Choice Awards	Choice Movie: Liplock (Shared with Elliot Page)	Won
2008	Juno	Teen Choice Awards	Best Movie Actor: Comedy	Nominated
2008	Juno	Teen Choice Awards	Choice Movie Breakout: Male	Nominated
2008	Himself	Teen Choice Awards	Choice Comedian	Nominated
2009	Himself	BAFTA Rising Star Award		Nominated
2009	Nick and Norah's Infinite Playlist	Teen Choice Awards	Choice Movie Actor: Music/Dance	Nominated
2010	Scott Pilgrim vs. the World	Satellite Awards	Best Actor: Comedy or Musical	Won
2011	Scott Pilgrim vs. the World	Teen Choice Awards	Choice Movie Actor: Action	Nominated
2014	Arrested Development	Screen Actors Guild Awards	Outstanding Ensemble in a Comedy Series	Nominated
2018	Lobby Hero	Tony Awards	Best Featured Actor in a Play	Nominated
2023	Barbie	Screen Actors Guild Awards	Outstanding Performance by a Cast in a Motion Picture	Nominated

== See also ==
- List of former child actors from Canada
- Italian Canadians
