= Athena (album) =

Studio album by Sudan Archives
- Released: November 1, 2019
- Length: 38:28
- Label: Stones Throw
- Producer: Sudan Archives; Will Archer; Collin Davis; John DeBold; Andre Elias; Kenny Gilmore; Donovan Jones; Los Retros; Rodaidh McDonald; Catherine Parks; Washed Out; Paul White

Sudan Archives chronology
Sink (2018)	Athena (2019)	Natural Brown Prom Queen (2022)

Singles from Athena
- 1. "Confessions" Released: August 30, 2019

Professional ratings
Aggregate scores
Source	Rating
AnyDecentMusic?	7.5/10
Metacritic	83/100
Review scores
Source	Rating
AllMusic	4/5 stars
Clash	9/10
Exclaim!	7/10
MusicOMH	4/5 stars
No Ripcord	7/10
Pitchfork	7.7/10

Athena is the debut studio album by American musician Sudan Archives. It was released on November 1, 2019 under Stones Throw Records.

The first single from the album, "Confessions" was released August 30, 2019.

== Critical reception ==
Athena was met with universal acclaim from critics. Metacritic assigned it a weighted average rating of 83 out of 100, based on 15 reviews from mainstream publications.

=== Accolades ===
Publication	Accolade	Rank	Ref.
AllMusic	Best of 2019	N/A	
Clash	Top 40 Albums of 2019	8	
DJ Mag	Top 50 Albums of 2019	24	
The Line of Best Fit	Top 50 Albums of 2019	39	
MusicOMH	Top 50 Albums of 2019	17	
The New York Times	Top 10 Albums of 2019	4	
No Ripcord	Top 50 Albums of 2019	39	
Passion of the Weiss	Top 50 Albums of 2019	6	
Slate	Best of 2019	N/A	
The Vinyl Factory	Top 50 Albums of 2019	49	

== Track listing ==
Athena track listing
No.	Title	Writer(s)	Producer(s)	Length
1.	"Did You Know"	Brittney Parks	Collin Davis; Catherine Parks; B. Parks	3:14
2.	"Confessions"	B. Parks; James R. McCall IV; Will Archer	Archer; B. Parks	2:53
3.	"Black Vivaldi Sonata"	B. Parks; Donovan Jones	Jones	2:50
4.	"Down on Me"	B. Parks; McCall IV	Rodaidh McDonald	4:10
5.	"Ballet of the Unhatched Twins I"	B. Parks	B. Parks	0:41
6.	"Green Eyes"	B. Parks; McCall IV	B. Parks; Andre Elias	3:41
7.	"Iceland Moss"	B. Parks; McCall IV	McDonald; Washed Out	3:30
8.	"Coming Up"	B. Parks; McCall IV; John DeBold	McDonald; B. Parks; DeBold	3:41
9.	"House of Open Tuning II"	B. Parks	B. Parks	0:38
10.	"Glorious"	B. Parks; McCall IV	Archer; B. Parks	2:27
11.	"Stuck"	B. Parks	B. Parks; Los Retros	1:08
12.	"Limitless"	B. Parks; Paul White	White	2:55
13.	"Honey"	B. Parks	B. Parks	3:02
14.	"Pelicans in the Summer"	B. Parks; McCall IV; Kenny Gilmore	B. Parks; Gilmore	3:38

== Personnel ==
Sourced from AllMusic.

Sudan Archives

- Brittney Parks - vocals, violin, mandolin, synthesizer, bass, drum programming, percussion; violin arrangement
