= Painless (album) =

Studio album by Nilüfer Yanya
- Released: 4 March 2022
- Studios: Press Play; Riverfish
- Genres: Indie rock; indie pop
- Length: 46:27
- Label: ATO
- Producers: Will Archer; Jazzi Bobbi; Bullion; Andrew Sarlo

Nilüfer Yanya chronology
Inside Out (2021)	Painless (2022)	My Method Actor (2024)

Singles from Painless
- 1. "Stabilise" Released: 9 November 2021; 2. "Midnight Sun" Released: 19 January 2022; 3. "Anotherlife" Released: 16 February 2022; 4. "The Dealer" Released: 28 February 2022

Painless is the second studio album by English singer Nilüfer Yanya. It was released on 4 March 2022 on ATO Records.

== Critical reception ==
Professional ratings
Aggregate scores
Source	Rating
AnyDecentMusic?	7.7/10
Metacritic	83/100
Review scores
Source	Rating
AllMusic	3.5/5 stars
The A.V. Club	A−
Exclaim!	8/10
The Guardian	4/5 stars
The Independent	4/5 stars
The Line of Best Fit	8/10
NME	3/5 stars
Pitchfork	8.4/10
The Telegraph	5/5 stars
Uncut	8/10

Painless was met with widespread acclaim reviews from critics. Pitchfork designated the album "Best New Music", with writer Laura Snapes opining that "Painless excels at a kind of subtle disclosure, relying less on power than it does texture and immaculately sparing detail." Chris Taylor of Line of Best Fit wrote, "crunchy, ethereal, and odd in its harsh beauty, Painless is a record of contradictions that Yanya spectacularly weaves together." In a five-star review The Telegraph proclaimed that the album "should rubber stamp Nilüfer Yanya as a generational star".

Publication	List	Rank	Ref.
A.V. Club	The 25 Best Albums of 2022	N/A	
BrooklynVegan	Top 50 Albums of 2022	3	
BrooklynVegan	Indie Basement: Top 40 Albums of 2022	5	
Crack	Best Albums of 2022	40	
Esquire	The 25 Best Albums of 2022	N/A	
Exclaim!	Exclaim!'s 50 Best Albums of 2022	21	
The Forty-Five	Albums of the year 2022	26	
The Independent	The 10 Best Indie Albums of 2022	2	
Gigwise	Gigewise's 51 Best Albums of 2022	15	
Gorilla Vs. Bear	Gorilla Vs Bear's Albums of 2022	12	
NPR	The 50 Best Albums of 2022	30	
ourculture	The 50 Best Albums of 2022	18	
Paste	The 50 Best Albums of 2022	36	
Pitchfork	The 50 Best Albums of 2022	16	
The Ringer	The 33 Best Albums of 2022	32	
Slant Magazine	The 50 Best Albums of 2022	11	
Treble	The 50 Best Albums of 2022	15	
Under the Radar	The 100 Best Albums of 2022	6	
Uproxx	The Best Indie Albums of 2022	N/A	

== Track listing ==
Painless track listing
No.	Title	Writer(s)	Producer(s)	Length
1.	"The Dealer"	Nilüfer Yanya; Will Archer; Jazzi Bobbi	Archer	3:38
2.	"L/R"	Yanya; Bullion	Bullion	3:39
3.	"Shameless"	Yanya; Archer	Archer	4:34
4.	"Stabilise"	Yanya; Archer	Archer	3:32
5.	"Chase Me"	Yanya; Archer	Archer	3:30
6.	"Midnight Sun"	Yanya; Archer	Archer	4:42
7.	"Trouble"	Yanya; Archer	Archer	5:04
8.	"Try"	Yanya; Archer	Archer	4:10
9.	"Company"	Yanya	Archer	3:46
10.	"Belong with You"	Yanya; Bobbi	Bobbi	2:56
11.	"The Mystic"	Yanya; Andrew Sarlo	Sarlo	3:33
12.	"Anotherlife"	Yanya; Bullion	Bullion	3:23
Total length:				46:27

Deluxe edition bonus tracks
No.	Title	Writer(s)	Producer(s)	Length
13.	"Shameless (Reflects)"	Yanya; Archer	Archer	4:37
14.	"Midnight Sun (Reflects)" (Acoustic Version)	Yanya; Archer	Archer	4:55
15.	"Chase Me (Reflects)"	Yanya; Archer	Archer	3:28
16.	"Midnight Sun" (Sampha Remix)	Yanya; Archer	Sampha	4:17
17.	"Midnight Sun" (King Krule Remix)	Yanya; Archer	King Krule	5:03
18.	"Rid of Me"	Polly Jean Harvey	Bobbi	3:37
Total length:				72:24

== Personnel ==
Musicians

- Nilüfer Yanya – lead vocals (all tracks), electric guitar (tracks 2, 9), guitars (10–12)
- Will Archer – electric guitar (tracks 1, 3–7, 9), acoustic guitar (1, 3, 6, 8), bass guitar (1, 4, 5, 8), piano (3), backing vocals (5, 8)
- Ellis Dupuy – drums (tracks 1, 4, 6, 10, 11)
- Ben Reed – bass guitar (tracks 2, 3, 12)
- Dom Pusey – clarinet (track 3)
- Jazzi Bobbi – vocals (track 10)

Technical

- Matt Colton – mastering (tracks 1–12, 18)
- Kevin Tuffy – mastering (tracks 13–17)
- Nathan Boddy – mixing (tracks 1–12)
- Will Archer – mixing (tracks 13–16), engineering (1, 3–8), additional engineering (9)
- Tom A.D. Fuller – mixing (track 18)
- Bullion – engineering (tracks 2, 12)
- Joe Dworniak – engineering (track 9), additional engineering (1, 3–8, 11)
- Jazzi Bobbi – engineering (track 10)
- Andrew Sarlo – engineering (track 11)
- Oli Barton Wood – engineering (tracks 13–15)
- Lilian Nuthall – mixing assistance
- Andy Ramsay – additional engineering (tracks 1, 4, 6, 8, 11)
- Dom Kirtley – additional engineering (10)
- M T Hadley – additional vocal engineering (11)

Visuals

- Molly Daniel – photography
- Nilüfer Yanya – photography, album artwork design
- Elif Yanya – paintings
- Lauren Harewood – additional font design

== Charts ==
Chart performance for Painless
Chart (2022)	Peak position
Scottish Albums (Official Charts)	33
UK Albums (Official Charts)	86
