= Blaze Foley =

American singer-songwriter (1949–1989)

Background information
- Also known as: Deputy Dawg, Duct Tape Messiah
- Born: Michael David Fuller; December 18, 1949; Malvern, Arkansas, U.S.
- Died: February 1, 1989 (aged 39) Austin, Texas, U.S.
- Genre: Outlaw country
- Years active: 1975–1989
- Website: https://www.blazefoley.com/

Michael David Fuller (December 18, 1949 – February 1, 1989), better known by his stage name Blaze Foley, was an American country music singer-songwriter, poet, and artist active in Austin, Texas.

== Background ==
Foley was born Michael David Fuller in Malvern, Arkansas on December 18, 1949. He grew up in San Antonio, Texas and performed in a gospel band called The Singing Fuller Family with his mother, brother, and sisters. As a child, Blaze contracted polio, and as a consequence, one of his legs was shorter than the other, causing him to drag his foot while walking. He was nicknamed "Deputy Dawg" early in his career. In the spring of 1975, he was living in a small artists' community just outside Whitesburg, Georgia when he met Sybil Rosen. Rosen and Foley were in a relationship and decided to leave the artist community together to support his music. He went on the road and performed in Atlanta, Chicago, Houston, and, finally, they ended up in Austin, Texas. Foley tried to get into songwriting, but after the move, he experienced career pressure and started drinking more. The bar scene complicated his relationship with Rosen, and it eventually ended.

Foley was close friends with Townes Van Zandt and was greatly influenced by him. Foley's stage name was inspired by his admiration of musician Red Foley and the stripper and burlesque performer Blaze Starr. He was also known as the “Duct Tape Messiah”, a nickname derived from his habit of decorating his clothing with duct tape.

== Music and lyrics ==
The master tapes from his first studio album were confiscated by the DEA when the album's executive producer was caught in a drug bust. Another studio album disappeared when the master copies were stolen along with his belongings from a station wagon that Foley had been given and lived in. A third studio album, Wanted More Dead Than Alive, was thought to have disappeared until, many years after Foley died, a friend who was cleaning out his car discovered what sounded like the Bee Creek recording sessions on which he and other musicians had performed. This was Foley's last studio album, and he was scheduled to tour the UK with Townes Van Zandt in support of the album. When Foley died, his attorney immediately nullified the recording contract and the master tapes subsequently disappeared, reportedly having been lost in a flood.

== Death and legacy ==
On February 1, 1989, Foley was at a house in the Bouldin Creek neighborhood of Austin, Texas when he was shot in the chest and killed by Carey January, the son of Foley's friend Concho January. Foley had confronted Carey January, accusing him of stealing his father's veteran pension and welfare checks. Carey January was acquitted of first-degree murder by reason of self-defense. He and his father presented completely different versions of the shooting at trial. Concho January, who has since died, liked to drink and proved an unreliable witness even though he tried to testify against his son.

At his funeral, Foley's casket was coated with duct tape by his friends. Townes Van Zandt told a story where he and his musicians went to Foley's grave to dig up his body because they wanted the pawn ticket that Foley had for Van Zandt's guitar.

=== Film and television ===
Foley's music is featured prominently in a feature-length documentary film about him entitled Blaze Foley: Duct Tape Messiah, released in 2011 by filmmaker Kevin Triplett.

Foley's song "Let Me Ride in Your Big Cadillac" featured prominently at the end of the 8th episode (July 2016) of the first season of the television show Preacher.

"Cold, Cold World" is featured in the 4th episode of Season 5 of The Mentalist, aired in October 2012.

In 2016 his song "Clay Pigeons" featured on the soundtrack of the movie Homestate.

In January 2018, Blaze, a biographical drama directed by Ethan Hawke, premiered at the Sundance Film Festival. The screenplay was adapted by Hawke from the novel Living in the Woods in a Tree: Remembering Blaze Foley by Sybil Rosen. The film stars musician Ben Dickey as Foley, Alia Shawkat as Sybil Rosen, and Charlie Sexton as Townes Van Zandt.

Season 1 Episode 8 of Mike Judge Presents: Tales from the Tour Bus premiered on November 10, 2017, featuring stories about Foley.

=== Music ===
Townes Van Zandt wrote the 1990 song "Blaze's Blues" about his friend and first released it on his 1991 live album Rain on a Conga Drum - Live in Berlin. He re-released it multiple times, notably on his two-disc album Live at Union Chapel, London, England.

Lucinda Williams wrote a Foley tribute song titled "Drunken Angel" for her 1998 album Car Wheels on a Gravel Road.

Gurf Morlix wrote a Foley tribute song titled "Music You Mighta Made" for his 2009 album Last Exit to Happyland. On February 1, 2011, Morlix released a 15-song collection of Foley cover songs titled Blaze Foley's 113th Wet Dream.

Kings of Leon recorded a Foley tribute song titled "Reverend" on their 2016 album Walls.

In 1998, a various artist Foley digital tribute album was released titled Blaze Foley: In Tribute and Loving Memory...Volume One, which includes Foley's work by 15 artists (Deep State Production).

His 1979 song "If I Could Only Fly" was covered on Merle Haggard and Willie Nelson's 1987 duet album Seashores of Old Mexico, with the song reaching Number 58 on the Billboard Hot Country Songs singles chart. It was covered again by Haggard on his 2000 album If I Could Only Fly. Joe Nichols recorded it as a duet with Lee Ann Womack on his 2007 album Real Things. Nanci Griffith recorded it on her 2012 album Intersection. Kimmie Rhodes recorded it on the aforementioned 1998 Foley tribute album Blaze Foley: In Tribute and Loving Memory...Volume One.

His song "Election Day" was covered by Lyle Lovett on his 2003 album My Baby Don't Tolerate.

His song "Clay Pigeons" was covered by John Prine on his Grammy Award-winning 2005 album Fair & Square and by Michael Cera on his 2014 album True That.

His song "Rainbows and Ridges" was covered by Chicago band Whitney on their 2020 covers album Candid.

In 2009, at the request of Foley's estate, Texas singer-songwriter and old-time music historian Jon Hogan was tasked with adding music to three unearthed songs from lyrics found in Foley's handwriting after his death. The three "new" songs "Every Now and Then", "Safe in the Arms of Love", and "Can't Always Cry" were recorded by Hogan on his 2010 tribute album Every Now and Then: Songs of Townes Van Zandt & Blaze Foley. In 2017, Hogan and musical partner Maria Moss re-recorded "Can't Always Cry" for their album In Dreams I Go Back Home.

In 2026, Lost Art Records released Sittin' With Blaze, a compilation album featuring new covers of Foley's mid-1970s “tree house” recordings by Lucy Dacus, John Moreland, Phosphorescent, Uncle Lucius, Willie Watson, Cactus Lee, Dylan Earl, Riley Downing, Joshua Ray Walker, Twain, Angela Autumn, John R. Miller, and Lucinda Williams. One reviewer called it "a celebration of still-living songs," and counted it "among the best tribute albums."

== Quotes ==
=== About Foley ===
- "He's only gone crazy once. Decided to stay." – Townes Van Zandt
- "Blaze Foley was a genius and a beautiful loser." – Lucinda Williams

== Discography ==
Album name	Year released	Publisher	Notes
If I Could Only Fly/Let Me Ride in Your Big Cadillac	1979	Zephyr Records	7" 45-only release; 1000
Blaze Foley	1984	Vital Records	LP-only release; 7497-33
Girl Scout Cookies/Oval Room	1984	Vital Records	7" 45-only release; 7077
Live at the Austin Outhouse (...And Not There)	1989	Outhouse Records	cassette-only release
Live at the Austin Outhouse	1999	Lost Art Records	
Oval Room	2004	Lost Art Records	(Munic/Indigo)
Wanted More Dead Than Alive	2005	Waddell Hollow Records	
Cold, Cold World	2006	Lost Art Records	
Sittin' by the Road	2010	Lost Art Records	
The Dawg Years	2010	Fat Possum Records	8 Track reissue by Sacred Bones
Duct Tape Messiah soundtrack	2011	Lost Art Records	
Blaze Foley (reissue)	2012	Big Pink	(Big Pink re-issue of Vital Records LP)
Blaze Foley The Lost Muscle Shoals Recordings	2017	Lost Art Records	featuring the Muscle Shoals Horns, Foley's first recorded album from a 1984 session recorded at Broadway Sound Studio. This album was missing for many years due to the DEA drug bust of the executive producer.

== Literature ==
- Carmen und Kai Nees: Blaze Foley - Ein Aussenseiter, der zur Legende wurde - Self-published in 2018; ISBN 978-3-00-058564-7 - Book in German.
- Carmen und Kai Nees: Blaze Foley - From Misfit To Legend - Self-published in 2018; ISBN 978-3-00-060018-0.

== See also ==
- List of singer-songwriters
