= Sudan Archives =

American musician

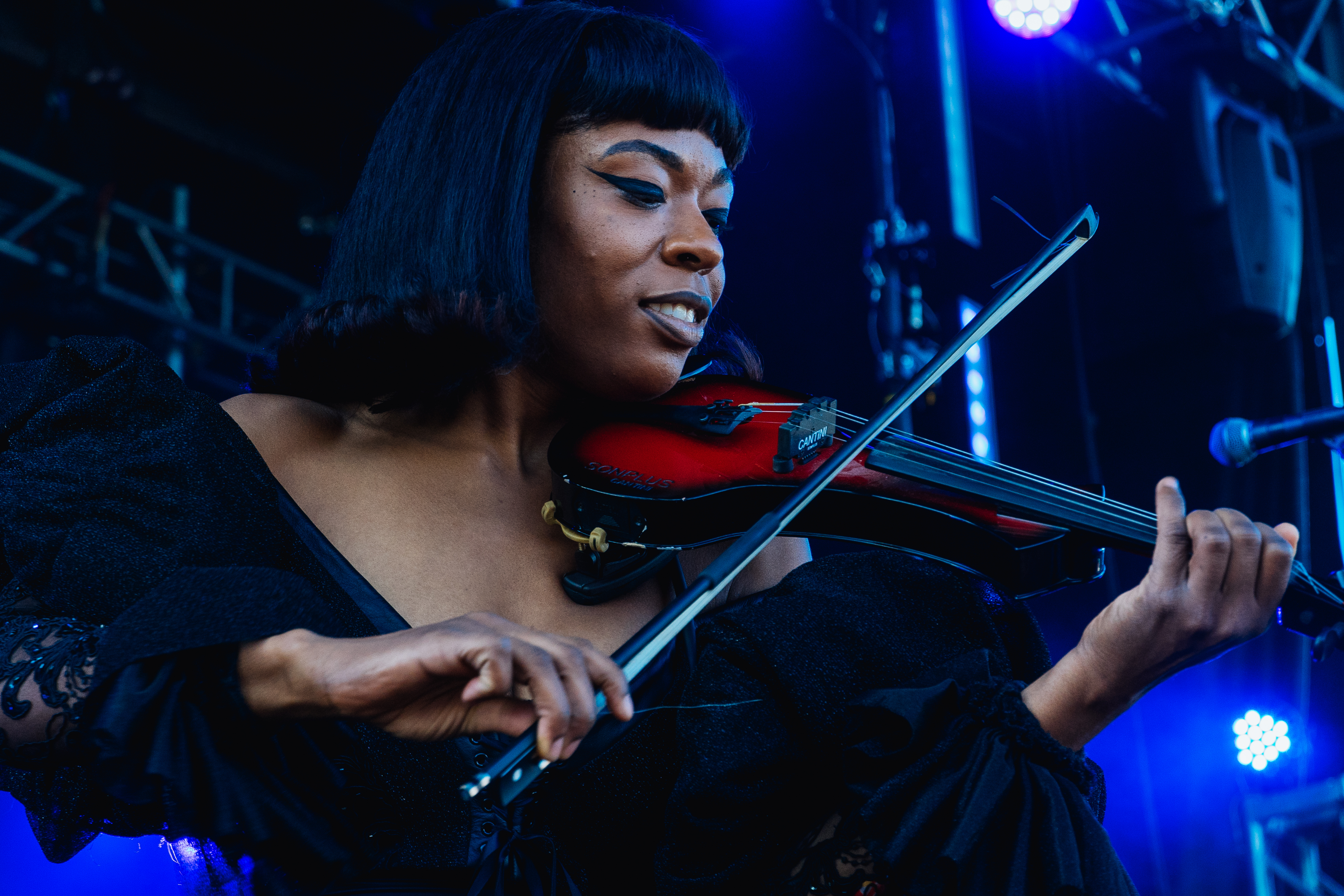
- Sudan Archives performing in 2019

Background information
- Born: Brittney Denise Parks; Cincinnati, U.S.
- Origin: Los Angeles, U.S.
- Genres: Electro; R&B
- Occupations: Violinist; singer
- Instruments: Violin; vocals
- Label: Stones Throw
- Website: sudanarchives.com

Brittney Denise Parks, better known by her stage name Sudan Archives, is an American violinist, singer, and songwriter based in Los Angeles, California. Parks learned to play the violin by ear as a young child in Cincinnati, Ohio.

Signed to Stones Throw Records, Parks has released three studio albums to date: Athena (2019), Natural Brown Prom Queen (2022), and The BPM (2025). She won two Libera Awards in 2023, for Best Breakthrough Artist/Release and Best R&B Record.

== Early life ==
Sudan Archives was born Brittney Denise Parks in Cincinnati, Ohio. She began playing violin in fourth grade, learning by ear. Parks' stepfather worked at the Atlanta-based record label LaFace Records, and he encouraged her to form a pop duo called N2 with her twin sister, Cat. However, Parks realized that she would rather not be in a band. She stated, "I felt stifled – it wasn't good for my creativity. All through high school I was a punk. I never stood up for the Pledge of Allegiance and I didn't sit with anyone at lunch. I just wanted to get out." After attending several late-night raves, Parks felt inspired to follow her own musical inclinations and left home for Los Angeles at age nineteen. Of the raves, she said that "Watching those artists, I realised that I didn't need to be in a band. I could do this by myself. My parents told me I couldn't live with them if I kept going out. So I left."

Parks studied ethnomusicology at Pasadena City College, while attending the experimental club night Low End Theory and working on her own musical material on her iPad. Embarking on a journey "to show the Blackness of the violin," Parks studied the history of violin performers across different cultures, noting: "I found violinists who looked like me in Africa, playing it so wildly. It's such a serious instrument in a western concert setting, but in so many other places in the world it brings the party."

== Career ==
=== 2017–2021: Early releases and Athena ===
Sudan Archives released her self-titled debut EP in 2017 and followed it with the Sink EP in 2018. The EP's lead single, "Nont for Sale", ranked as one of Stereogum's favorite songs in May 2018. Parks released her debut studio album, Athena, the following year. The album received widespread critical acclaim from publications such as The Guardian, which said it contained "some of the most viscerally gorgeous music put to record", The Quietus, which commended Parks for her "knack for writing massive hooks that will dig straight into your brain", Variety, which described Athena as "innovative, unusual and inviting", and many more.

=== 2022–2024: Natural Brown Prom Queen ===
On March 16, 2022, Parks returned with "Home Maker", her first new track in three years and the first single from her second studio album, Natural Brown Prom Queen. Pitchfork made it one of their Best New Tracks and described it as Parks' "most approachable yet, a swaggering statement of intent with all the idiosyncratic charm that makes her music so memorable". Parks headlined the Stones Throw showcase at South by Southwest the following day.

On September 9, 2022, Natural Brown Prom Queen was released to widespread critical acclaim, with Parks noting of the album's variety: "It felt like time to let people know who I am. My stage name is kind of academic and on Athena, I created this thoughtful persona centred on divine Black femininity. Now I want to show my looseness, too. I'm a deep, insightful person, but I'm also fucking silly."

In 2023, Sudan Archives won two Libera Awards, for Best Breakthrough Artist/Release and Best R&B Record.

=== 2024–present: The BPM ===
In June 2025, Parks released the single "Dead", the first from her new album, titled The BPM, which came out in October. The record was inspired by her parents' roots in Michigan and Illinois and incorporates club sounds from both cities as well as exploring various styles of dance music. Pitchfork described it as a "tense and virtuosic new album", which "documents a life in motion, blending breakups and rebounds, dancefloor euphoria and everyday anxiety".

== Musical style and influences ==
Sudan Archives has taken inspiration from a variety of African musicians, including Cameroonian electronic musician Francis Bebey and Sudanese violinist Asim Gorashi. She is also inspired by Irish music. When performing, Sudan Archives sometimes uses electronic effects pedals and electronic beats and has also performed in a string quartet.

== Personal life ==
Parks has a twin sister named Cat, with whom she was briefly part of a pop duo called N2. Parks lives in Los Angeles. During the COVID-19 pandemic, she dated James McCall, better known by the stage names Nocando and All City Jimmy. The couple built a home studio together in Parks's basement, where she recorded Natural Brown Prom Queen. They broke up during the recording of The BPM.

== Discography ==
=== Studio albums ===
- Athena (2019)
- Natural Brown Prom Queen (2022)
- The BPM (2025)

=== EPs ===
- Sudan Archives (2017)
- Sink (2018)

=== Singles ===
- "Water" (2017)
- "Nont for Sale" (2018)
- "Confessions" (2019)
- "Glorious" (2019)
- "Confessions (Velvet Negroni Remix)" (2020)
- "Glorious (Nídia Remix)" (2020)
- "Home Maker" (2022)
- "Selfish Soul" (2022)
- "DEAD" (2025)
