= Ben Dickey =

American actor and musician

Ben Dickey (born 1977) is an American actor and musician best known for playing Blaze Foley in the 2018 biographical drama Blaze. For his performance in the film, Dickey won the Sundance Film Festival U.S. Dramatic Special Jury Award for Achievement in Acting.

Originally from Little Rock, Arkansas, Dickey now resides in Louisiana as of 2018. In 2016, he released his first album Sexy Birds and Salt Water Classics. In 2019, he released his second album A Glimmer On The Outskirts which was produced by his Blaze co-star Charlie Sexton.

== Filmography ==
- The Hottest State (2006)
- Blaze (2018)
- The Kid (2019)
- The Last Movie Stars (2022)
- Heartland (2026)
