= Nilüfer Yanya =

British musician (born 1995)

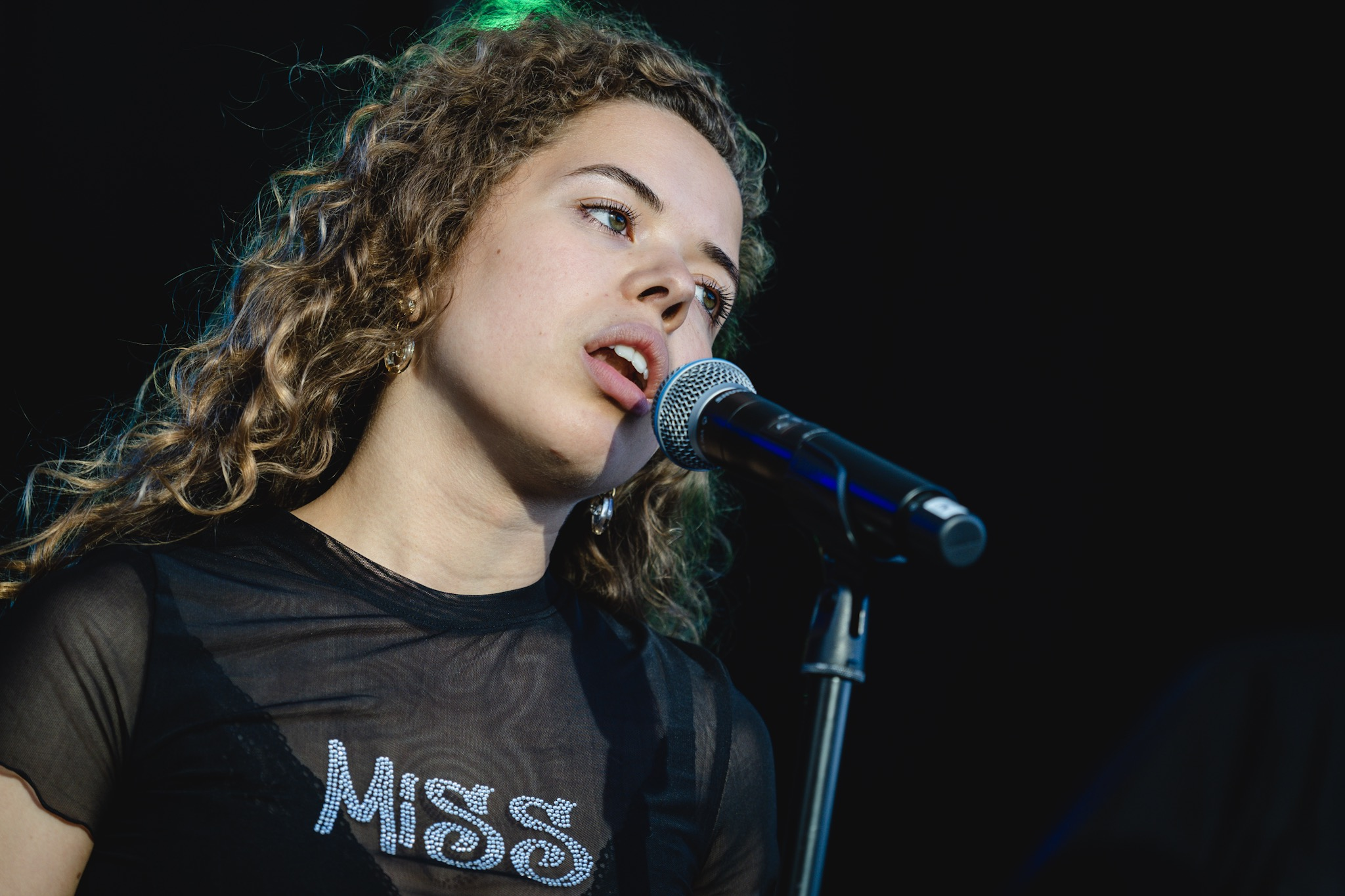
- Yanya performing in 2019

Background information
- Born: 11 May 1995 (age 31); London, England
- Genres: Indie rock; alternative rock
- Occupations: Singer; songwriter; musician
- Instruments: Vocals; guitar; keyboards
- Years active: 2016–present
- Label: ATO
- Website: niluferyanya.com

Nilüfer Yanya (/ˈnɪləfər ˈjænjə/; born 11 May 1995) is a British singer, songwriter and musician.

== Early life ==
Yanya is the daughter of two visual artists. Her mother is of Irish and Barbadian heritage and her father is Turkish. Yanya said her mother lived in Turkey with her father when they were expecting her, and often heard the Turkish pop singer Nilüfer's name on the radio. She loved the name so much that she said, "If I have a daughter, I will name her Nilüfer."

Yanya grew up in Chelsea, London, listening to Turkish music and classical music at home. She gravitated to rock music and learned how to play guitar at the age of 12.

== Career ==
Informally starting her musical career with demos uploaded to SoundCloud in 2014, Yanya turned down an offer to join a girl group produced by Louis Tomlinson of One Direction and focused on developing her own music instead. She has spoken out against this model of talent acquisition, telling The Guardian: "'Let's go and pinch some young people, tell them we're going to make a really successful group but we're obviously going to make a lot more money than them.' It's a very selfish thing to do." The project was reportedly abandoned after a year.

Her first EP, Small Crimes/Keep on Calling, was released in 2016. Her second EP, Plant Feed, was released in 2017, followed by Do You Like Pain? in 2018. All three EPs were later compiled into the EP Inside Out in 2021.

In 2019, Yanya released her debut studio album, Miss Universe, which received rave reviews and critical acclaim, with critics noting her ability to bounce back and forth between musical and lyrical styles, shifting between "gimlet-eyed composure and cataclysmic panic". Yanya's music has been described as nervous and restless, combining influences from indie rock to soul, jazz, and trip hop. A Stereogum review called her voice "malleable and endlessly expressive."

In 1-2 July 2022, Yanya performed before Adele's first live UK concert after five years, in Hyde Park. Later that year, Yanya was the UK opening act for rock band Roxy Music, who reformed in 2022 for a 50th anniversary tour.

Yanya featured on the Bombay Bicycle Club track "Meditate" on the band's 2023 album My Big Day.

In May 2025, Yanya was announced as a supporting act on Lorde's upcoming Ultrasound World Tour.

== Musical style ==
Les Inrockuptibles has likened her material to the likes of King Krule, Siouxsie and the Banshees, Parquet Courts and the Breeders.

== Personal life ==
Yanya has tried to embrace her Turkish heritage more as an adult and started taking Turkish lessons. She likes to involve her family in her career, with her younger sister Elif sometimes performing with her as a backing singer and her elder sister Molly directing her music videos.

== Discography ==
Studio albums

- Miss Universe (2019)
- Painless (2022)
- My Method Actor (2024)

EPs

- Small Crimes/Keep on Calling (2016)
- Plant Feed (2017)
- Do You Like Pain? (2018)
- Feeling Lucky? (2020)
- Inside Out (2021)
- Dancing Shoes (2025)
