= List of Coldplay live performances =

Live performances of British band

Coldplay live performances
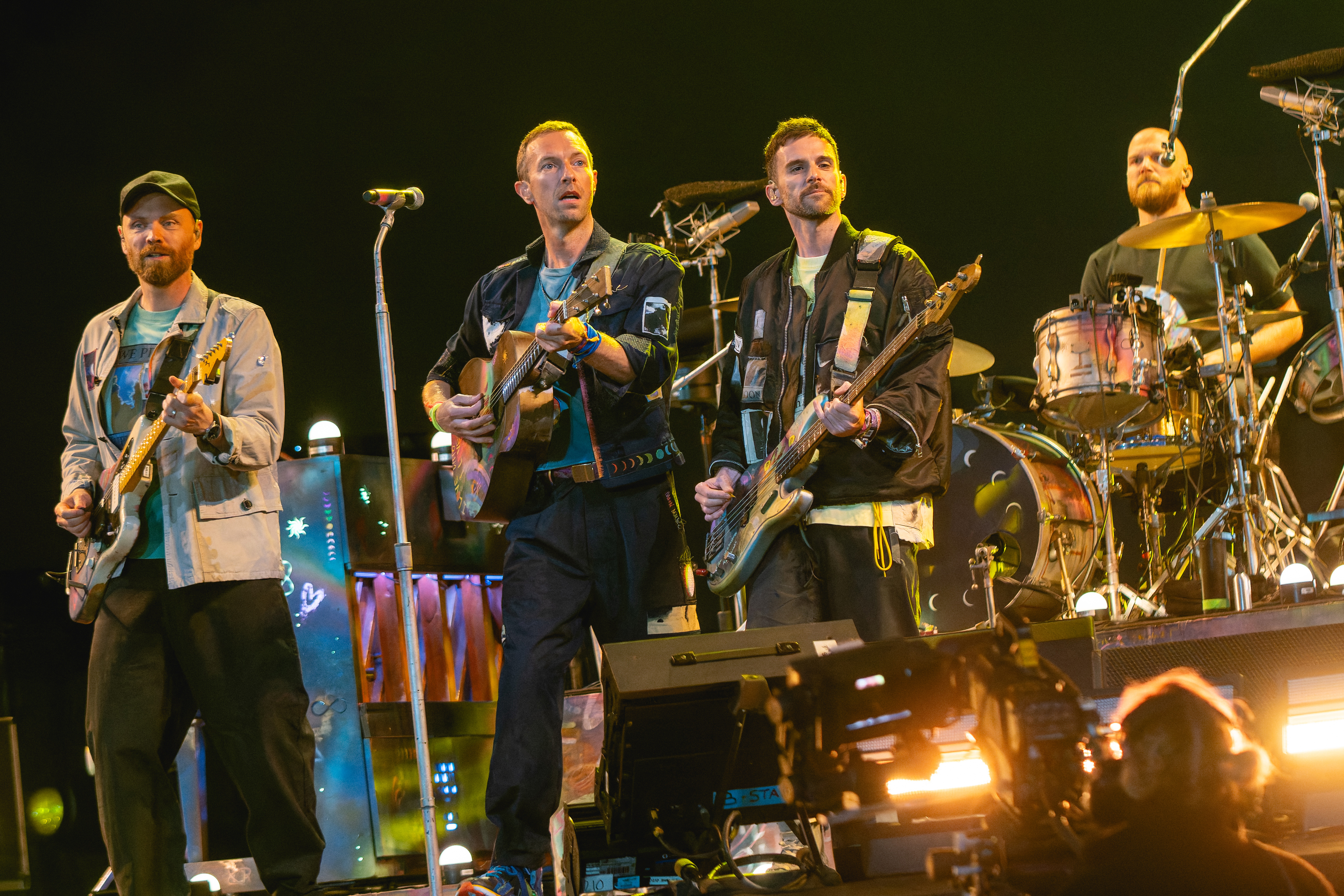
- Coldplay at Glastonbury Festival in 2024
- Concert tours: 8
- Promotional concerts: 21
- Music festivals: 166
- Award shows: 48
- Television shows and specials: 169
- Radio shows and specials: 58
- Other live performances: 209

British rock band Coldplay have headlined eight concert tours and numerous promotional shows, music festivals, broadcast media events and other live performances. Considered one of the most prolific live acts from the United Kingdom, they have visited all continents except Antarctica. Their debut was officially held at London's Laurel Tree in 1998. A year before, however, drummer and percussionist Will Champion busked in Covent Garden alongside vocalist and pianist Chris Martin, becoming the first version of the group to engage with audiences. Since then, Coldplay have broadened their craft to theatres, arenas and stadiums on the Rush of Blood to the Head (2002–2003), Twisted Logic (2005–2007) and Viva la Vida (2008–2010) runs.

This growth was fostered by warm-up shows before every tour, which included their first performance at Coachella. According to Pollstar, the band earned $142.9 million from 2.6 million tickets sold in North America during the 2000s. The marketing push for Mylo Xyloto (2011) then saw Coldplay headline festivals such as Glastonbury, Lollapalooza, Austin City Limits, and Rock in Rio. Its namesake tour was the first to make use of LED wristbands and the group have been widely credited with popularising the feature. A visit to Latin America was set for early 2013, but ended up being cancelled. In 2014, Ghost Stories prompted a return to theatres, matching the intimate and subdued tone of the album.

Conversely, the Head Full of Dreams Tour (2016–2017) saw Coldplay perform exclusively at stadiums in every territory outside the United States, which also included arena dates. It became one of the highest-grossing concert runs of all time, with over $523 million from 5.38 million tickets sold across 114 nights. In February 2016, their Super Bowl 50 halftime show set had the biggest television audience for a group. Months later, they headlined Glastonbury for a record fourth time. (Note: The achievement was extended to five headline performances in 2024.) Everyday Life (2019) was not toured because Coldplay wanted to address environmental concerns. The album was instead advertised with charity events and an exclusive live broadcast on YouTube, which was staged at the Amman Citadel.

In 2021, the band performed at the Brit Awards for an eighth time, breaking the record for most sets at the ceremony. That same year, they announced the Music of the Spheres World Tour (2022–2025), which featured ecological initiatives to reduce CO_{2} emissions by 50% in comparison to their previous concert run. Coldplay were credited with ushering in a new era of sustainable touring through this venture, becoming pioneers for the future of live entertainment. The initial 223 shows generated over $1.52 billion from 13.1 million tickets sold, making it the most-attended tour of all time and the first by a group to surpass $1 billion. Publications noticed that they were responsible for boosting local economies as well. In 2024, Coldplay were musical guests on Saturday Night Live for the eighth time, a record among international acts. Moreover, they have been ranked as one of the highest-earning live music artists in history, collecting more than $2.48 billion from 24.8 million admissions throughout their career (starting from February 2001).

== Key ==
†	Indicates a performance that Champion carried out alone or not with all of his bandmates
‡	Indicates a performance that Martin carried out alone or not with all of his bandmates

== Concert tours ==
List of concert tours
Year	Title	Shows	Actual gross	Adjusted gross (in 2025 dollars)	Attendance	Ref.
2000–2001	Parachutes Tour	131	$4,201,871	$7,640,124	262,140	
2002–2003	A Rush of Blood to the Head Tour	151	$27,152,888	$47,522,466	854,424	
2005–2007	Twisted Logic Tour	139	$105,834,960	$164,332,088	2,059,068	
2008–2010	Viva la Vida Tour	166	$222,256,153	$328,144,099	3,022,635	
2011–2012	Mylo Xyloto Tour	76	$181,396,540	$254,386,364	2,100,124	
2014	Ghost Stories Tour	9	$3,092,008	$4,205,113	29,129	
2016–2017	A Head Full of Dreams Tour	122	$523,033,675	$686,987,620	5,389,586	
2022–2025	Music of the Spheres World Tour	225	$1,524,423,018	$1,524,423,018	13,138,644	

== Promotional concerts ==
List of promotional concerts
Date	City	Country	Event	Ref.
10 July 2000	London	England	Live at HMV Oxford Circus	
9 November 2000	Lille	France	Live at FNAC Lille	
13 February 2001	Los Angeles	United States	Live at Virgin Megastore	
22 October 2008	New York City	United States	Nissan Live Sets	
20 September 2011	New York City	United States	Live on Letterman	
26 October 2011	Madrid	Spain	Coldplay: Unstaged	
31 October 2011 (Note: The concert in Paris on 31 October 2011 was a private performance for NRJ and Orange.)	Paris	France	Live at La Cigale	
5 May 2014 (Note: Not to be confused with the general public performance, held on the same day and venue as part of the Ghost Stories Tour.)	New York City	United States	A Very Special Performance from Coldplay	
16 May 2014 (Note: The concert in Burbank on 16 May 2014 was broadcast on radio by iHeartRadio.)	Burbank	United States	iHeartRadio Album Release Party with Coldplay	
19 November 2015 (Note: The concert in Burbank on 19 November 2015 was broadcast on radio by iHeartRadio.)	Burbank	United States	iHeartRadio Album Release Party with Coldplay	
21 November 2015 (Note: The concert in Los Angeles on 21 November 2015 was originally planned for 13 November 2015, but it was rescheduled due to the Paris attacks.)	Los Angeles	United States	Tidal X: Coldplay	
22 November 2019	Amman	Jordan	Everyday Life – Live in Jordan	
23 November 2019	Amman	Jordan	Live at the Amman Citadel	
25 November 2019	London	England	Live at the Natural History Museum	
21 January 2020	Los Angeles	United States	Citi Sound Vault	
9 March 2020	Washington, D.C.	United States	Tiny Desk Concerts	
14 September 2021 (Note: The concert in Burbank on 14 September 2021 was broadcast on radio by iHeartRadio.)	Burbank	United States	iHeartRadio Album Release Party with Coldplay	
20 September 2021 (Note: The concert in New York City on 20 September 2021 was broadcast on radio by Audacy.)	New York City	United States	Audacy Live: A Coldplay Album Release Concert	
12 October 2021	London	England	Live at Shepherd's Bush Empire	
22 October 2021 (Note: The concert in Seattle on 22 October 2021 was broadcast on the internet by Amazon Prime Video and made available to stream for 30 days.)	Seattle	United States	Live from Climate Pledge Arena	
7 October 2024	New York City	United States	Live in Brooklyn	

== Music festivals ==
List of music festival performances
Date	City	Country	Event	Ref.
2 July 1998	London	England	Best of Unsigned	
25 July 1998	London	England	Okaziya Festival	
26 July 1998	London	England	Okaziya Festival	
14 September 1998	Manchester	England	In the City Festival	
7 January 1999	London	England	Pandamonium	
18 March 1999	London	England	Club Panda	
27 June 1999	Pilton	England	Glastonbury Festival	
29 August 1999	Reading	England	Reading and Leeds Festivals	
30 August 1999	Leeds	England	Reading and Leeds Festivals	
27 October 1999	Liverpool	England	BBC Radio 1's Sound City	
24 June 2000	Pilton	England	Glastonbury Festival	
7 July 2000	Belfort	France	Eurockéennes	
9 July 2000	Kinross	Scotland	T in the Park	
14 July 2000	Villafranca di Verona	Italy	Rockaforte Festival	
16 July 2000	Misterbianco	Italy	Sonica Festival	
30 July 2000	Birmingham	England	Ronnie Scott's Songwriters Festival	
5 August 2000	Fujiyoshida	Japan	Summer Sonic Festival	
13 August 2000	Paredes de Coura	Portugal	Paredes de Coura Festival	
18 August 2000	Weeze	Germany	Bizarre Festival	
19 August 2000	Chelmsford	England	V Festival	
20 August 2000	Weston-under-Lizard	England	V Festival	
25 August 2000	Biddinghuizen	Netherlands	Lowlands	
26 August 2000	Hasselt	Belgium	Pukkelpop	
1 September 2000	Pilton	England	Pilton Party ‡	
25 October 2000	Cardiff	Wales	BBC Radio 1's Sound City	
4 November 2000	Amsterdam	Netherlands	Crossing Border Festival	
9 November 2000	Lille	France	Les Inrockuptibles Festival	
10 November 2000	Paris	France	Les Inrockuptibles Festival	
11 November 2000	Nantes	France	Les Inrockuptibles Festival	
13 November 2000	Toulouse	France	Les Inrockuptibles Festival	
17 November 2000	Barcelona	Spain	Pop Attack Festival	
5 December 2000	Hamburg	Germany	Rolling Stone Roadshow	
6 December 2000	Berlin	Germany	Rolling Stone Roadshow	
16 December 2000	Los Angeles	United States	KROQ Almost Acoustic Christmas	
19 January 2001	Auckland	New Zealand	Big Day Out	
21 January 2001	Gold Coast	Australia	Big Day Out	
26 January 2001	Sydney	Australia	Big Day Out	
28 January 2001	Melbourne	Australia	Big Day Out	
2 February 2001	Adelaide	Australia	Big Day Out	
4 February 2001	Perth	Australia	Big Day Out	
26 May 2001	Foxborough	United States	WBCN River Rave	
27 May 2001	Washington, D.C.	United States	HFStival	
28 May 2001	Washington, D.C.	United States	HFStival	
23 June 2001	Irvine	United States	KROQ Weenie Roast	
3 July 2001	Kristiansand	Norway	Quart Festival	
8 July 2001	Kinross	Scotland	T in the Park	
18 August 2001	Chelmsford	England	V Festival	
19 August 2001	Weston-under-Lizard	England	V Festival	
25 August 2001	Slane	Ireland	Slane Festival	
2 September 2001	Leicester	England	BBC Radio 1's One Big Sunday	
10 October 2001	New York City	United States	CMJ Music Marathon	
28 November 2001	Providence	United States	WBRU's 32nd Birthday Bash	
1 December 2001	Fairfax	United States	WHFS HFSmas Nutcracker	
3 December 2001	Boston	United States	WNYR Holiday Hoedown	
7 December 2001	Seattle	United States	Deck the Hall Ball	
8 December 2001	San Diego	United States	Frosty the Show, Man	
9 December 2001	Los Angeles	United States	KROQ Almost Acoustic Christmas	
22 June 2002	London	England	Meltdown	
28 June 2002	Pilton	England	Glastonbury Festival	
30 June 2002	Werchter	Belgium	Rock Werchter	
3 July 2002	Ringe	Denmark	Midtfyns Festival	
6 November 2002	Paris	France	Les Inrockuptibles Festival	
8 December 2002	Los Angeles	United States	KROQ Almost Acoustic Christmas	
9 December 2002	San Francisco	United States	KLLC Alice in Winterland	
11 December 2002	Boston	United States	WBCN Christmas Rave	
12 December 2002	Uniondale	United States	K-Rock Claus Fest	
13 December 2002	Washington, D.C.	United States	WHFS HFSmas Nutcracker	
15 December 2002	Philadelphia	United States	WRNB Y100 Feastival	
15 March 2003	London	England	One Big No ‡	
24 May 2003	George	United States	Sasquatch! Music Festival	
20 June 2003	Scheeßel	Germany	Hurricane Festival	
21 June 2003	Neuhausen ob Eck	Germany	Southside Festival	
23 June 2003	Rome	Italy	Cornetto Free Music Festival	
24 June 2003	Fano	Italy	Il Violino e la Selce	
27 June 2003	Roskilde	Denmark	Roskilde Festival	
29 June 2003	Werchter	Belgium	Rock Werchter	
1 July 2003	Nijmegen	Netherlands	Nijmegen Festival	
3 July 2003	Kristiansand	Norway	Quart Festival	
12 July 2003	County Kildare	Ireland	Witnness	
13 July 2003	Kinross	Scotland	T in the Park	
20 July 2003	Byron Bay	Australia	Splendour in the Grass	
26 July 2003	Yuzawa	Japan	Fuji Rock Festival	
16 August 2003	Chelmsford	England	V Festival	
17 August 2003	Weston-under-Lizard	England	V Festival	
12 March 2005	Santa Monica	United States	KCRW A Sounds Eclectic Evening	
30 April 2005	Indio	United States	Coachella	
14 May 2005	Baltimore	United States	HFStival	
25 June 2005	Pilton	England	Glastonbury Festival	
2 July 2005	London	England	Live 8	
10 July 2005	Mank	Austria	Nuke Festival	
13 July 2005	Locarno	Switzerland	Moon&Stars	
14 July 2005	Six-Fours-les-Plages	France	Les Voix du Gaou	
29 July 2005	Yuzawa	Japan	Fuji Rock Festival	
25 September 2005	Austin	United States	Austin City Limits Music Festival	
11 December 2005	Los Angeles	United States	KROQ Almost Acoustic Christmas	
11 June 2006	Newport	England	Isle of Wight Festival	
27 November 2006	London	England	Little Noise Sessions ‡	
27 July 2008	Pemberton	United States	Pemberton Festival	
9 August 2008	Osaka	Japan	Summer Sonic Festival	
10 August 2008	Chiba	Japan	Summer Sonic Festival	
2 July 2009	Arras	France	Main Square Festival	
3 July 2009	Werchter	Belgium	Rock Werchter	
5 July 2009	Roskilde	Denmark	Roskilde Festival	
1 August 2009	Montreal	Canada	Osheaga Festival	
2 August 2009	Jersey City	United States	All Points West Music & Arts Festival	
24 October 2009	Mountain View	United States	Bridge School Benefit ‡	
25 October 2009	Mountain View	United States	Bridge School Benefit ‡	
19 December 2009	Exeter	England	Little Noise Sessions	
3 June 2011	Nuremberg	Germany	Rock im Park	
4 June 2011	Nürburg	Germany	Rock am Ring	
9 June 2011	Venice	Italy	Heineken Jammin' Festival	
11 June 2011	Landgraaf	Netherlands	Pinkpop Festival	
25 June 2011	Pilton	England	Glastonbury Festival	
28 June 2011	Gothenburg	Sweden	Where the Action Is	
30 June 2011	Gdynia	Poland	Open'er Festival	
2 July 2011	Werchter	Belgium	Rock Werchter	
3 July 2011	Arras	France	Main Square Festival	
6 July 2011	Oeiras	Portugal	Optimus Alive	
7 July 2011	Bilbao	Spain	Bilbao BBK Live	
9 July 2011	Kinross	Scotland	T in the Park	
10 July 2011	Naas	Ireland	Oxegen	
22 July 2011	London	England	iTunes Festival	
29 July 2011	Niigata	Japan	Fuji Rock Festival	
31 July 2011	Woodford	Australia	Splendour in the Grass	
5 August 2011	Chicago	United States	Lollapalooza	
16 September 2011	Austin	United States	Austin City Limits Music Festival	
23 September 2011	Paradise	United States	iHeartRadio Music Festival	
24 September 2011	Atlanta	United States	Music Midtown	
1 October 2011	Rio de Janeiro	Brazil	Rock in Rio	
24 November 2011	London	England	Little Noise Sessions ‡	
4 March 2012	New York City	United States	The Secret Policeman's Ball	
5 May 2012	Irvine	United States	KROQ Weenie Roast	
9 June 2012	London	England	Summertime Ball	
11 March 2014	Austin	United States	iTunes Festival	
24 May 2014	Glasgow	Scotland	BBC Radio 1's Big Weekend	
19 September 2014	Paradise	United States	iHeartRadio Music Festival	
18 September 2015	Paradise	United States	iHeartRadio Music Festival	
26 September 2015	New York City	United States	Global Citizen Festival	
5 December 2015	London	England	Jingle Bell Ball	
29 May 2016	Exeter	England	BBC Radio 1's Big Weekend	
26 June 2016	Pilton	England	Glastonbury Festival	
4 September 2016	Philadelphia	United States	Made in America Festival	
24 September 2016	New York City	United States	Global Citizen Festival ‡	
19 November 2016	Mumbai	India	Global Citizen Festival	
4 June 2017	Manchester	England	One Love Manchester	
6 July 2017	Hamburg	Germany	Global Citizen Festival	
22 September 2017	Paradise	United States	iHeartRadio Music Festival	
24 September 2017	Charlottesville	United States	A Concert for Charlottesville	
2 December 2018	Johannesburg	South Africa	Global Citizen Festival: Mandela 100 ‡	
18 January 2020	Inglewood	United States	iHeartRadio ALTer Ego	
9 May 2020 (Note: The concert in Los Angeles on 9 May 2020 was a pre-recorded performance broadcast on the internet due to the COVID-19 pandemic.)	Los Angeles	United States	320 Festival	
18 September 2020 (Note: The concert in London on 18 September 2020 was a pre-recorded performance broadcast on the internet due to the COVID-19 pandemic.)	London	England	iHeartRadio Music Festival	
22 May 2021	Pilton	England	Live at Worthy Farm	
28 May 2021	Whitby	England	BBC Radio 1's Big Weekend	
18 September 2021	Paradise	United States	iHeartRadio Music Festival	
25 September 2021	New York City	United States	Global Citizen Live	
23 October 2021	Los Angeles	United States	We Can Survive	
15 January 2022	Los Angeles	United States	iHeartRadio ALTer Ego	
10 September 2022	Rio de Janeiro	Brazil	Rock in Rio	
10 December 2022	London	England	Jingle Bell Ball	
26 May 2024	Luton	England	BBC Radio 1's Big Weekend	
29 June 2024	Pilton	England	Glastonbury Festival	
21 September 2024	Paradise	United States	iHeartRadio Music Festival ‡	
28 September 2024	New York City	United States	Global Citizen Festival ‡	
7 December 2024	London	England	Jingle Bell Ball	
1 November 2025	Belém	Brazil	Global Citizen Festival ‡	

== Award shows ==
List of award show performances
Air date	Country	Name	Performed songs	Ref.
12 September 2000	England	2000 Mercury Prize	"Yellow" †	
26 February 2001	England	2001 Brit Awards	"Trouble"	
14 November 2002	Spain	2002 MTV Europe Music Awards	"In My Place"	
20 February 2003	England	2003 Brit Awards	"Clocks"	
23 February 2003	United States	45th Annual Grammy Awards	"Politik"	
23 August 2003	United States	2003 MTV Video Music Awards	"The Scientist"	
28 August 2005	United States	2005 MTV Video Music Awards	"Speed of Sound"	
29 October 2005	Denmark	2005 Nordic Music Awards	"Fix You"	
3 November 2005	Portugal	2005 MTV Europe Music Awards	"Talk"	
21 January 2006	France	2006 NRJ Music Awards	"Talk"	
8 February 2006	United States	48th Annual Grammy Awards	"Talk"	
14 February 2006	England	2006 Brit Awards	"Square One"	
2 April 2006	Canada	2006 Juno Awards	"Talk"	
1 June 2008	United States	2008 MTV Movie Awards	"Viva la Vida"	
23 November 2008	United States	2008 American Music Awards	"Lovers in Japan"	
17 January 2009	France	2009 NRJ Music Awards	"Life in Technicolor II" ‡	
6 February 2009	United States	2009 MusiCares Person of the Year	"I'm a Believer"	
8 February 2009	United States	51st Annual Grammy Awards	"Lost!" · "Viva la Vida"	
18 February 2009	England	2009 Brit Awards	"Viva la Vida"	
6 November 2011	Northern Ireland	2011 MTV Europe Music Awards	"Every Teardrop Is a Waterfall"	
28 November 2011	Netherlands	2011 Prince Bernhard Culture Fund Prize	"Viva la Vida" ‡	
28 January 2012	France	2012 NRJ Music Awards	"Paradise"	
10 February 2012	United States	2012 MusiCares Person of the Year	"We Can Work It Out"	
12 February 2012	United States	54th Annual Grammy Awards	"We Found Love" · "Princess of China" · "Paradise"	
21 February 2012	England	2012 Brit Awards	"AKA... What a Life!" (Note: Performed by Martin with Noel Gallagher's High Flying Birds.) · "Charlie Brown"	
21 October 2013	United States	17th Hollywood Film Awards	"Atlas"	
10 April 2014	United States	2014 Rock and Roll Hall of Fame	"Washing of the Water" ‡	
14 June 2014	Japan	2014 MTV Video Music Awards Japan	"Magic" · "A Sky Full of Stars"	
11 December 2014	England	2014 BBC Music Awards	"A Sky Full of Stars"	
13 December 2014	France	2014 NRJ Music Awards	"A Sky Full of Stars"	
8 February 2015	United States	57th Annual Grammy Awards	"Heart Is a Drum" ‡	
7 November 2015	France	2015 NRJ Music Awards	"Adventure of a Lifetime"	
22 November 2015	United States	2015 American Music Awards	"Adventure of a Lifetime"	
17 February 2016	England	2016 NME Awards	"Viva la Vida" · "Charlie Brown" · "Clocks" · "Yellow" · "Adventure of a Lifetime" · "Fix You"	
24 February 2016	England	2016 Brit Awards	"Hymn for the Weekend"	
12 November 2016	France	2016 NRJ Music Awards	"Everglow"	
12 December 2016	England	2016 BBC Music Awards	"Everglow"	
22 February 2017	England	2017 Brit Awards	"A Different Corner" (Note: Performed by Martin alone as a tribute to George Michael.) · "Something Just Like This"	
5 March 2017	United States	2017 iHeartRadio Music Awards	"Something Just Like This"	
14 March 2019	United States	2019 iHeartRadio Music Awards	"Rainbow" ‡	
14 March 2021	United States	63rd Annual Grammy Awards	"You'll Never Walk Alone" ‡	
11 May 2021	England	2021 Brit Awards	"Higher Power"	
17 October 2021	England	2021 Earthshot Prize	"My Universe"	
20 November 2021	France	2021 NRJ Music Awards	"My Universe"	
21 November 2021	United States	2021 American Music Awards	"My Universe"	
27 March 2023	United States	2023 iHeartRadio Music Awards	"My Universe"	
12 December 2024	United States	2024 Billboard Music Awards	"All My Love"	
2 February 2025	United States	67th Annual Grammy Awards	"All My Love" ‡	

== Television shows and specials ==
List of television show and special performances
Air date	Country	Name	Performed songs	Ref.
6 May 2000	England	Later... with Jools Holland	"Yellow" · "Shiver"	
8 May 2000	England	Five Night Stand	"Yellow" · "High Speed" · "Don't Panic" · "Trouble" · "Spies" · "Shiver"	
26 June 2000 (Note: Not to be confused with the general public performance, held on the same day at Paradiso as part of the Parachutes Tour.)	Netherlands	2 Meter Sessions	"Yellow" · "Don't Panic" · "Trouble" · "Shiver" · "Harmless" · "High Speed" · "You Only Live Twice" · "We Never Change"	
7 July 2000	England	Top of the Pops	"Yellow"	
1 August 2000	England	The Barfly Sessions	"Spies" · "Shiver" · "Everything's Not Lost" · "Yellow" · "Trouble"	
3 November 2000	England	Top of the Pops	"Trouble"	
6 November 2000	Italy	Sonic	"Shiver" · "Yellow" · "Trouble" · "Don't Panic"	
8 November 2000	England	The Priory	"Trouble"	
14 November 2000	France	Nulle Part Ailleurs	"Yellow"	
15 November 2000	France	Live at MCM Café	"Spies" · "Trouble" · "Bigger Stronger" · "High Speed" · "Shiver" · "Sparks" · "Don't Panic" · "Yellow" · "We Never Change" · "Everything's Not Lost" · "You Only Live Twice"	
31 December 2000	England	Jools' Annual Hootenanny	"Yellow" · "Trouble" · "Don't Panic"	
30 January 2001	Australia	Live at the Chapel	"Shiver" · "Sparks" · "Yellow" · "Trouble" · "Everything's Not Lost"	
16 February 2001	United States	Late Night with Conan O'Brien	"Yellow"	
7 April 2001	United States	Saturday Night Live	"Yellow" · "Don't Panic"	
27 June 2001	United States	Late Show with David Letterman	"Trouble"	
1 August 2001	United States	Music Choice Live	"Spies" · "Shiver" · "Trouble" · "Don't Panic" · "Animals" · "Yellow"	
8 August 2001	United States	Reverb	"Shiver" · "Don't Panic" · "Spies" · "Yellow" · "Everything's Not Lost" · "Trouble"	
26 July 2002	England	Top of the Pops	"In My Place"	
2 August 2002	United States	$2 Bill Show	"Politik" · "God Put a Smile upon Your Face" · "Trouble" · "Daylight" · "Yellow" · "In My Place" · "The Scientist" · "Hot in Here" · "Shiver" · "Spies" · "Clocks" · "The Scientist" · "Life Is for Living" · "Don't Panic" · "Lips Like Sugar" · "Everything's Not Lost" · "See You Soon"	
4 August 2002	Canada	Live at MusiquePlus	"Politik" · "God Put a Smile upon Your Face" · "Trouble" · "Daylight" · "Yellow" · "In My Place" · "The Scientist" · "Life Is for Living"	
30 August 2002	England	Top of the Pops	"Daylight"	
12 September 2002	United States	The Tonight Show with Jay Leno	"Clocks" · "In My Place"	
22 September 2002	Canada	Intimate and Interactive	"Politik" · "God Put a Smile upon Your Face" · "Trouble" · "Don't Panic" · "One I Love" · "Clocks" · "Yellow" · "In My Place" · "The Scientist" · "Life Is for Living"	
26 September 2002	United States	Late Night with Conan O'Brien	"In My Place"	
16 November 2002	England	CD:UK	"In My Place" · "The Scientist"	
22 November 2002	England	Top of the Pops	"The Scientist"	
6 December 2002	England	Later... with Jools Holland	"In My Place" · "God Put a Smile upon Your Face" · "The Scientist" · "Clocks"	
16 December 2002	United States	Late Show with David Letterman	"In My Place"	
26 January 2003	United States	Jimmy Kimmel Live!	"Clocks" · "Yellow" · "In My Place" · "Trouble"	
10 February 2003	United States	The Tonight Show with Jay Leno	"Clocks"	
13 February 2003	United States	AOL Sessions	"Clocks" · "The Scientist" · "Yellow" · "Don't Panic" · "Warning Sign"	
14 March 2003	England	Comic Relief	"In My Place"	
1 April 2003	Germany	Die Harald Schmidt Show	"Clocks"	
4 April 2003	England	Top of the Pops	"Clocks"	
22 July 2003	Australia	Rove	"God Put a Smile upon Your Face" ‡	
9 September 2003	Mexico	Otro Rollo	"Clocks"	
27 November 2004	Australia	The MAX Sessions	"Politik" · "Don't Panic" · "Clocks" · "The Scientist" · "God Put a Smile upon Your Face" · "In My Place" · "Yellow"	
20 May 2005	England	Top of the Pops	"Speed of Sound"	
21 May 2005	United States	Saturday Night Live	"Speed of Sound" · "Fix You"	
3 June 2005	England	Friday Night with Jonathan Ross	"Speed of Sound" · "In My Place" · "Fix You"	
5 June 2005	United States	MTV Live Leak	"Square One" · "Low" · "What If" · "Speed of Sound" · "Til Kingdom Come" · "A Message" · "Fix You" · "Clocks"	
8 June 2005	United States	VH1 Storytellers	"Square One" · "Politik" · "Yellow" · "Speed of Sound" · "Warning Sign" · "Clocks" · "The Scientist" · "In My Place" · "Fix You" · "Til Kingdom Come"	
11 June 2005	England	CD:UK	"What If" · "Square One" · "A Message" · "Fix You" · "Speed of Sound"	
17 June 2005	England	Later... with Jools Holland	"Square One" · "What If" · "White Shadows"	
17 June 2005	England	Top of the Pops	"What If"	
28 August 2005	England	Top of the Pops	"Fix You"	
10 September 2005	United States	ReAct Now: Music & Relief	"Fix You"	
13 November 2005	Italy	Che Tempo Che Fa	"Talk"	
2 December 2005	England	Friday Night with Jonathan Ross	"Talk"	
7 December 2005	United States	Late Night with Conan O'Brien	"Talk" · "Have Yourself a Merry Little Christmas"	
12 December 2005	United States	The Tonight Show with Jay Leno	"Talk"	
17 December 2005	United States	Austin City Limits	"Square One" · "Yellow" · "Speed of Sound" · "X&Y" · "White Shadows" · "Til Kingdom Come" · "Ring of Fire" · "Clocks" · "In the Sun" · "Nightswimming" · "Talk" · "In My Place" · "Fix You"	
4 June 2008	United States	Jimmy Kimmel Live!	"Clocks" · "Violet Hill" · "Viva la Vida" · "Fix You"	
13 June 2008	England	Friday Night with Jonathan Ross	"Violet Hill" · "Viva la Vida"	
18 June 2008	England	Coldplay at the BBC	"Life in Technicolor" · "Violet Hill" · "Clocks" · "In My Place" · "Viva la Vida" · "42" · "Trouble" · "Lost!" · "Yellow" · "Fix You" · "Lovers in Japan"	
25 June 2008	United States	The Daily Show with Jon Stewart	"Lost!" · "42"	
27 June 2008	France	Concert Privé	"Violet Hill" · "Clocks" · "42" · "Viva la Vida" · "The Scientist" · "Fix You" · "Lovers in Japan"	
27 June 2008	United States	The Today Show	"Clocks" · "Viva la Vida" · "Lost!" · "In My Place" · "42"	
17 July 2008	United States	The Tonight Show with Jay Leno	"Viva la Vida" · "Lost!"	
8 September 2008	Japan	SMAP×SMAP	"Viva la Vida"	
10 September 2008	France	Le Grand Journal	"Viva la Vida"	
7 October 2008	England	Later... with Jools Holland	"Viva la Vida" · "Lost!"	
10 October 2008	England	Later... with Jools Holland	"Violet Hill" · "Lovers in Japan" · "42" · "Viva la Vida"	
25 October 2008	United States	Saturday Night Live	"Viva la Vida" · "Lost!" · "Yellow" · "Lovers in Japan"	
30 November 2008	England	4Music Presents... Coldplay	"Viva la Vida" · "Lost!" · "Lovers in Japan" · "Glass of Water" · "Fix You"	
25 December 2008	England	Top of the Pops	"Viva la Vida"	
31 December 2008	England	Top of the Pops	"Life in Technicolor II"	
24 January 2009	Germany	Wetten, dass..?	"Viva la Vida"	
14 March 2009	Australia	Sound Relief	"Life in Technicolor" · "Yellow" · "Lost!" · "Clocks" · "Viva la Vida" · "You're the Voice" · "Fix You"	
22 January 2010	England	Hope for Haiti Now	"A Message" · "Halo"	
25 December 2010	England	Top of the Pops	"Christmas Lights"	
3 August 2011	United States	Jimmy Kimmel Live!	"Charlie Brown" · "Every Teardrop Is a Waterfall"	
20 September 2011	United States	Late Show with David Letterman	"Paradise"	
21 September 2011	Canada	Live in the Lot	"Mylo Xyloto" · "Hurts Like Heaven" · "Yellow" · "In My Place" · "Major Minus" · "Paradise" · "God Put a Smile upon Your Face" · "Viva la Vida" · "Charlie Brown" · "The Scientist" · "Clocks" · "Fix You" · "Every Teardrop Is a Waterfall" · "Us Against the World"	
15 October 2011	England	The Jonathan Ross Show	"Paradise"	
20 October 2011	United States	The Colbert Report	"Paradise" · "Up in Flames"	
21 October 2011	France	Taratata	"Paradise" · "Viva la Vida" · "Every Teardrop Is a Waterfall"	
21 October 2011	United States	The Today Show	"Yellow" · "Charlie Brown" · "Paradise" · "Viva la Vida" · "Every Teardrop Is a Waterfall" · "Fix You"	
25 October 2011	England	Later... with Jools Holland	"Hurts Like Heaven" · "Paradise" · "Charlie Brown" · "Every Teardrop Is a Waterfall"	
27 October 2011	United States	The Ellen DeGeneres Show	"Viva la Vida" · "Paradise" · "Clocks" · "Fix You" · "Every Teardrop Is a Waterfall"	
2 November 2011	France	Le Grand Journal	"Paradise" · "Charlie Brown"	
12 November 2011	United States	Saturday Night Live	"Paradise" · "Every Teardrop Is a Waterfall"	
17 November 2011	England	Children in Need Rocks Manchester	"Every Teardrop Is a Waterfall" · "Paradise" · "Viva la Vida"	
21 November 2011	Italy	Il Più Grande Spettacolo Dopo Il Weekend	"Yellow" · "Clocks" · "Every Teardrop Is a Waterfall" · "Paradise"	
23 November 2011	Norway	Senkveld	"Mylo Xyloto" · "Hurts Like Heaven" · "Yellow" · "In My Place" · "Major Minus" · "The Scientist" · "Violet Hill" · "God Put a Smile upon Your Face" · "Paradise" · "Up in Flames" · "Viva la Vida" · "Charlie Brown" · "Clocks" · "Fix You" · "Every Teardrop Is a Waterfall"	
7 December 2011	United States	Late Night with Jimmy Fallon	"Charlie Brown"	
9 December 2011	England	The Graham Norton Show	"Paradise"	
11 December 2011	England	The X Factor	"Charlie Brown" · "Paradise"	
31 December 2011	United States	Austin City Limits	"Mylo Xyloto" · "Hurts Like Heaven" · "Yellow" · "In My Place" · "Major Minus" · "Lost!" · "The Scientist" · "Violet Hill" · "God Put a Smile upon Your Face" · "Up in Flames" · "Us Against the World" · "Politik" · "Viva la Vida" · "Charlie Brown" · "Paradise" · "Clocks" · "Fix You" · "Every Teardrop Is a Waterfall"	
26 February 2012	United States	Jimmy Kimmel Live!	"Charlie Brown" · "Paradise"	
2 March 2012	United States	Good Morning America	"Yellow" · "Charlie Brown" · "Paradise"	
3 May 2012	United States	American Idol	"Paradise" · "Every Teardrop Is a Waterfall"	
7 September 2012	United States	Stand Up to Cancer	"Paradise"	
9 September 2012	England	2012 Summer Paralympics Closing Ceremony	"Life in Technicolor" · "Politik" · "Us Against the World" · "Yellow" · "Up in Flames" · "Paradise" · "42" · "God Put a Smile upon Your Face" · "Clocks" · "Charlie Brown" · "Princess of China" · "Strawberry Swing" · "We Found Love" · "Viva la Vida" · "Run This Town" · "Paradise" (Reprise) · "The Scientist" · "Every Teardrop Is a Waterfall"	
15 November 2012	Australia	Sunrise	"Yellow" · "Charlie Brown" · "Viva la Vida" · "Paradise"	
12 December 2012	United States	12-12-12: The Concert for Sandy Relief	"Viva la Vida" · "Losing My Religion" · "Us Against the World" ‡	
24 April 2014	France	Le Grand Journal	"Magic"	
30 April 2014	England	Later... with Jools Holland	"Magic" · "Oceans" · "A Sky Full of Stars"	
3 May 2014	United States	Saturday Night Live	"Magic" · "A Sky Full of Stars"	
6 May 2014	United States	The Tonight Show Starring Jimmy Fallon	"Magic" · "Always in My Head"	
20 May 2014	United States	The Voice	"A Sky Full of Stars"	
21 May 2014	United States	The Ellen DeGeneres Show	"Magic" · "A Sky Full of Stars"	
30 May 2014	England	The Graham Norton Show	"A Sky Full of Stars"	
13 June 2014	Japan	Music Station	"Viva la Vida" · "A Sky Full of Stars"	
23 June 2014	Australia	The Voice	"A Sky Full of Stars" · "Magic"	
24 June 2014	Australia	Sunrise	"Magic" · "Paradise" · "A Sky Full of Stars"	
9 August 2014	Australia	The MAX Sessions	"Always in My Head" · "Charlie Brown" · "Paradise" · "Magic" · "Clocks" · "Ink" · "True Love" · "Viva la Vida" · "Oceans" · "A Sky Full of Stars" · "Fix You"	
5 December 2014	Germany	The Voice of Germany	"A Sky Full of Stars"	
6 November 2015	England	TFI Friday	"Adventure of a Lifetime" · "Amazing Day" · "Clocks" · "A Sky Full of Stars"	
4 December 2015	United States	The Ellen DeGeneres Show	"Adventure of a Lifetime" · "Everglow"	
5 December 2015	England	The Jonathan Ross Show	"Adventure of a Lifetime" · "Christmas Lights" (Note: Performed on 5 December 2015 but aired on 26 December 2015.)	
7 December 2015	United States	The Late Late Show with James Corden	"Adventure of a Lifetime" · "A Head Full of Dreams"	
8 December 2015	Germany	Telekom Street Gigs	"A Head Full of Dreams" · "Yellow" · "Adventure of a Lifetime" · "Paradise" · "Everglow" · "Magic" · "Charlie Brown" · "Clocks" · "Fix You" · "Hymn for the Weekend" · "Viva la Vida" · "Amazing Day" · "A Sky Full of Stars" · "Up&Up"	
9 December 2015	France	Le Grand Journal	"Adventure of a Lifetime" · "Everglow" · "A Head Full of Dreams"	
10 December 2015	Italy	X Factor Italia	"Adventure of a Lifetime" · "A Head Full of Dreams"	
13 December 2015	England	The X Factor	"Adventure of a Lifetime"	
15 December 2015	United States	The Voice	"Adventure of a Lifetime"	
17 December 2015	Germany	The Voice of Germany	"Adventure of a Lifetime"	
25 December 2015	England	Top of the Pops	"Adventure of a Lifetime"	
2 February 2016	United States	The Late Late Show with James Corden	"Adventure of a Lifetime" · "Yellow" · "Hymn for the Weekend" · "Viva la Vida" · "Heroes" · "Us Against the World" · "Paradise" ‡	
7 February 2016	United States	Super Bowl 50 Halftime Show	"Yellow" · "Viva la Vida" · "Paradise" · "Adventure of a Lifetime" · "Uptown Funk" · "Formation" · "Fix You" / "Up&Up"	
14 March 2016	United States	The Today Show	"Hymn for the Weekend" · "A Sky Full of Stars" · "Up&Up" · "Adventure of a Lifetime" · "Yellow"	
15 March 2016	United States	The Tonight Show Starring Jimmy Fallon	"Up&Up" · "A Head Full of Dreams"	
17 May 2016	United States	The Late Show with Stephen Colbert	"Hymn for the Weekend" · "Up&Up"	
18 May 2016	United States	Good Morning America	"Hymn for the Weekend" · "Up&Up"	
27 October 2016	United States	Conan	"Yellow" · "Hymn for the Weekend" ‡	
11 November 2016	England	The Graham Norton Show	"Everglow"	
13 November 2016	Italy	Che Tempo Che Fa	"Everglow" · "Hymn for the Weekend" · "Up&Up"	
14 October 2017	United States	One Voice: Somos Live!	"Many Rivers to Cross" ‡	
10 April 2018	United States	Elton John: I'm Still Standing – A Grammy Salute	"We All Fall in Love Sometimes" ‡	
2 November 2019	United States	Saturday Night Live	"Orphans" · "Everyday Life"	
9 December 2019	France	Quotidien	"Orphans"	
13 December 2019	England	The Graham Norton Show	"Everyday Life"	
15 January 2020	United States	The Ellen DeGeneres Show	"Cry Cry Cry" · "Orphans"	
11 April 2020	United States	Saturday Night Live at Home	"Shelter from the Storm" ‡	
21 April 2020	United States	Let's Go Crazy: The Grammy Salute to Prince	"Manic Monday" ‡	
25 May 2020	Various	Wan Music Show	"A Sky Full of Stars" ‡	
27 June 2020	Various	Global Goal: Unite for Our Future	"Paradise"	
9 May 2021	United States	American Idol	"Higher Power"	
16 June 2021	United States	The Tonight Show Starring Jimmy Fallon	"Higher Power"	
17 June 2021	United States	The Today Show	"Clocks" · "Higher Power"	
30 June 2021	Canada	Etalk Open House	"Higher Power"	
4 July 2021	United States	Macy's 4th of July Fireworks	"Viva la Vida" · "Higher Power"	
11 July 2021	Philippines	ASAP Natin 'To	"Higher Power"	
13 September 2021	United States	The Kelly Clarkson Show	"Green Eyes" · "Since U Been Gone" · "Pony" · "I Wanna Dance with Somebody (Who Loves Me)" · "Yellow" · "My Universe" (Note: Performed on 13 September 2021 but aired on 24 September 2021.) ‡	
5 October 2021	France	Quotidien	"My Universe" · "Higher Power" · "Clocks"	
12 October 2021	Germany	In Concert	"Higher Power" · "Clocks" · "Fix You" · "Viva la Vida" · "Human Heart" · "People of the Pride" · "My Universe" · "Yellow" · "A Sky Full of Stars" · "Coloratura"	
15 October 2021	England	The Graham Norton Show	"My Universe"	
18 October 2021	United States	The Late Late Show with James Corden	"Let Somebody Go"	
19 October 2021	United States	The Late Late Show with James Corden	"My Universe"	
20 October 2021	United States	The Late Late Show with James Corden	"Human Heart"	
21 October 2021	United States	The Late Late Show with James Corden	"Higher Power"	
26 November 2021	France	Taratata	"Higher Power" · "Yellow" · "The Scientist" · "People of the Pride" · "My Universe"	
9 December 2021	Italy	X Factor Italia	"Higher Power" · "My Universe"	
14 December 2021	United States	The Voice	"My Universe"	
26 January 2022	United States	The Ellen DeGeneres Show	"My Universe" · "Let Somebody Go"	
10 June 2022	United States	The Tonight Show Starring Jimmy Fallon	"Biutyful" ‡	
16 January 2023	England	The Mayfair Hotel Megabuild	"Have Yourself a Merry Little Christmas" (Note: Only a small portion of the performance was exhibited, since the documentary is focused on the renovation of Claridge's.) ‡	
23 January 2023	United States	Jimmy Kimmel Live!	"Clocks"	
4 February 2023	United States	Saturday Night Live	"The Astronaut" · "Human Heart" · "Fix You"	
2 October 2024	United States	Q Sessions Live	"Feelslikeimfallinginlove" · "Jupiter" · "All My Love" · "Candy's Song" · "We Pray"	
5 October 2024	United States	Saturday Night Live	"All My Love" · "We Pray"	
8 October 2024	United States	The Today Show	"Good Feelings" · "Feelslikeimfallinginlove" · "Something Just Like This" · "All My Love" · "We Pray"	
18 October 2024	United States	The Kelly Clarkson Show	"All My Love" ‡	
6 December 2024	England	The Graham Norton Show	"All My Love"	
8 February 2025	Canada	2025 Invictus Games Opening Ceremony	"Invictus Games Anthem" · "Higher Power" · "Viva la Vida" ‡	
14 February 2025	United States	SNL50: The Homecoming Concert	"I Can't Make You Love Me" ‡	
13 July 2025	United States	2025 FIFA Club World Cup Halftime Show	"Desire" · "Mi Gente" · "Reggaeton" · "Love Me JeJe" · "Woman" · "A Sky Full of Stars"	
19 July 2026	United States	2026 FIFA World Cup Final Halftime Show	"Music" · "Seven Nation Army" · "Dynamite" · "Everything Hallelujah" · "Dai Dai" · "We Dance"	

== Radio shows and specials ==
List of radio show and special performances
Air date	Country	Name	Performed songs	Ref.
3 January 1999	England	Evening Session	"Bigger Stronger" · "Shiver" · "Brothers & Sisters"	
13 January 2000	England	Evening Session	"Trouble" · "You Only Live Twice" · "Shiver" · "Sparks"	
5 July 2000	England	Live at XFM	"Yellow" · "Don't Panic" · "Trouble"	
24 July 2000	England	Lamacq Live	"Spies" · "Bigger Stronger" · "Don't Panic" · "High Speed" · "Yellow" · "Trouble" · "Shiver" · "We Never Change" · "Everything's Not Lost" · "You Only Live Twice"	
4 September 2000	England	Live Lounge	"Yellow" · "Shiver"	
10 November 2000	France	Les Inrockuptibles Session	"Don't Panic" · "Trouble" · "Yellow"	
16 November 2000	Netherlands	Denk aan Henk	"Yellow" · "Don't Panic" · "Trouble"	
20 December 2000	United States	Morning Becomes Eclectic	"Don't Panic" · "Spies" · "Shiver" · "We Never Change" · "Yellow" · "Trouble" · "Have Yourself a Merry Little Christmas"	
2 April 2001	Australia	By Demand	"Shiver" · "Trouble" · "Yellow"	
1 June 2001	United States	World Cafe	"Shiver" · "Don't Panic" · "Yellow" · "Trouble" · "Warning Sign" · "In My Place"	
10 December 2001	United States	Morning Becomes Eclectic	"Yellow" · "A Ghost" · "Have Yourself a Merry Little Christmas" ‡	
13 December 2001	United States	The Cane Show	"Trouble"	
10 July 2002	Germany	1Live Radiokonzert	"Politik" · "Shiver" · "Trouble" · "Don't Panic" · "In My Place" · "God Put a Smile upon Your Face" · "Yellow" · "The Scientist" · "Hunting High and Low"	
31 July 2002	England	Live Lounge	"In My Place" · "I Bloom Blaum" · "God Put a Smile upon Your Face"	
20 August 2002	United States	Morning Becomes Eclectic	"The Scientist" · "In My Place" · "Yellow"	
5 December 2002	Japan	Viva! Access	"Green Eyes"	
8 February 2003	United States	Dave Pratt's Private Reserve	"In My Place" · "Don't Panic" · "Green Eyes" · "Warning Sign" · "Yellow" · "Shiver" · "The Scientist"	
13 February 2003	United States	Star Lounge	"In My Place" · "The Scientist" · "Don't Panic" · "Warning Sign" · "Clocks" · "Yellow"	
25 March 2003	England	The Mark & Lard Show	"Clocks" · "All the Things She Said" · "In My Place" · "The Scientist" · "Yellow"	
3 June 2003	United States	Kevin and Bean	"In My Place" · "Don't Panic" · "Clocks" · "The Scientist"	
12 July 2003	United States	Up Close and Personal	"In My Place" · "Yellow" · "Don't Panic" · "The Scientist" · "Clocks" · "Amsterdam"	
27 August 2003	United States	The Julie Slater Show	"God Put a Smile upon Your Face" · "Moses" ‡	
9 May 2005	Canada	The Edge Acoustic Session	"A Message" · "Til Kingdom Come" · "Clocks" · "Don't Panic" · "Yellow" · "Shiver" · "The Scientist"	
7 October 2005	United States	World Cafe	"Warning Sign" · "Swallowed in the Sea" · "Til Kingdom Come" · "A Message"	
13 February 2006	England	Live & Exclusive	"Square One" · "Politik" · "Yellow" · "White Shadows" · "Swallowed in the Sea" · "How You See the World No. 2" · "Don't Panic" · "Clocks" · "Talk" · "Til Kingdom Come" · "The Hardest Part" · "In My Place" · "Fix You"	
30 August 2008	England	In Concert	"Life in Technicolor" · "Violet Hill" · "Clocks" · "Viva la Vida" · "42" · "The Hardest Part" · "Chinese Sleep Chant" · "God Put a Smile upon Your Face" · "Yellow" · "Lost!" · "Trouble" · "The Scientist" · "Lovers in Japan" · "Death and All His Friends" · "Strawberry Swing"	
29 January 2009	England	The Edith Bowman Show	"Viva la Vida" · "The Scientist" · "Back for Good" · "Life in Technicolor II" ‡	
29 January 2009	England	Live at XFM	"Fix You" · "Life in Technicolor II" · "Talk" · "Viva la Vida" ‡	
29 January 2009	England	The Lucio Show	"Viva la Vida" · "Life in Technicolor II" ‡	
30 January 2009	England	Zoo Session	"Viva la Vida" · "Life in Technicolor II" · "The Scientist" · "Violet Hill" ‡	
30 January 2009	England	The Steve Lamacq Show	"Life in Technicolor II" · "Shiver" · "Death and All His Friends" ‡	
31 January 2009	England	The Jonathan Ross Show	"Viva la Vida" · "Life in Technicolor II" · "Back on TV" ‡	
10 November 2009	United States	Stripped	"Lost!" · "Strawberry Swing" · "Viva la Vida" · "Death Will Never Conquer" · "Billie Jean"	
17 December 2010	England	Fearne Cotton	"Christmas Lights"	
27 March 2011	England	Jo Whiley's Last Radio 1 Show with Dave Grohl	"Stay Another Day"	
18 October 2011	United States	Kevin and Bean	"Yellow" · "Paradise" · "Viva la Vida" · "Charlie Brown" · "Fix You" · "Every Teardrop Is a Waterfall"	
27 October 2011	England	Live Lounge	"Hurts Like Heaven" · "We Found Love" · "Paradise"	
2 November 2011	Germany	1Live Radiokonzert	"Mylo Xyloto" · "Hurts Like Heaven" · "Yellow" · "In My Place" · "Major Minus" · "The Scientist" · "Violet Hill" · "God Put a Smile upon Your Face" · "Paradise" · "Up in Flames" · "Viva la Vida" · "Charlie Brown" · "Clocks" · "Fix You" · "Speed of Sound" · "Every Teardrop Is a Waterfall"	
9 November 2011	United States	The Howard Stern Show	"Yellow" · "Clocks" · "The Scientist" · "Viva la Vida" · "Paradise"	
15 December 2011	England	In Concert	"Mylo Xyloto" · "Hurts Like Heaven" · "Yellow" · "In My Place" · "What If" · "Major Minus" · "Us Against the World" · "God Put a Smile upon Your Face" · "The Scientist" · "Up in Flames" · "Viva la Vida" · "Charlie Brown" · "Paradise" · "Clocks" · "Fix You" · "Christmas Lights"	
19 December 2013	England	Live Lounge	"Christmas Lights" · "White Christmas"	
23 April 2014	England	Live Lounge	"Magic" · "Oceans"	
26 April 2014	Germany	SWR3 Hautnah	"Always in My Head" · "Clocks" · "Magic" · "Don't Panic" · "Paradise" · "Another's Arms" · "Oceans" · "Viva la Vida" · "Til Kingdom Come" · "Midnight"	
9 August 2014	United States	Artist Confidential	"Always in My Head" · "Clocks" · "Viva la Vida" · "A Sky Full of Stars" · "Fly On" ‡	
8 December 2014	England	In Concert	"Always in My Head" · "Charlie Brown" · "Paradise" · "Magic" · "Clocks" · "The Scientist" · "Ink" · "True Love" · "Viva la Vida" · "Midnight" · "Every Teardrop Is a Waterfall" · "Fix You" · "A Sky Full of Stars" · "Christmas Lights"	
22 May 2015	England	Fearne Cotton	"Gone But Not F. Cotton"	
3 December 2015	England	Live Lounge	"Adventure of a Lifetime" · "Christmas Lights"	
3 December 2015	England	Annie Mac	"A Head Full of Dreams" · "Clocks" · "Paradise" · "Magic" · "A Sky Full of Stars" · "Everglow" · "Charlie Brown" · "Fix You" · "Hymn for the Weekend" · "Viva la Vida" · "Adventure of a Lifetime" · "Up&Up" · "Happy Birthday to You" · "Christmas Lights" · "White Christmas"	
7 December 2016	Australia	Nova's Red Room	"Yellow" · "A Sky Full of Stars" · "Everglow" · "Viva la Vida" · "Hymn for the Weekend" · "Adventure of a Lifetime" · "Christmas Lights"	
4 September 2017	England	Live Lounge Month	"Yellow" · "Hymn for the Weekend" · "Graceland" ‡	
27 November 2019	England	Future Sounds	"Guns" · "Orphans" · "Daddy" · "Lovers in Japan" · "Arabesque" · "Gypsy Woman (She's Homeless)" · "Everyday Life"	
28 November 2019	England	The Jo Whiley Show	"Trouble in Town" · "Cry Cry Cry" · "Everyday Life" · "When I Need a Friend"	
15 January 2020	United States	Live at SiriusXM Studios	"Orphans" · "Viva la Vida" · "Daddy" · "Fix You" · "Cry Cry Cry" · "Champion of the World"	
22 September 2021	United States	The Howard Stern Show	"Fix You" · "Viva la Vida" · "Coloratura"	
23 September 2021	United States	Small Stage	"Higher Power" · "Clocks" · "Fix You" · "Viva la Vida" · "Human Heart" · "People of the Pride" · "Adventure of a Lifetime" · "The Scientist" · "Paradise" · "Yellow" · "My Universe" · "A Sky Full of Stars" · "Coloratura"	
26 October 2021	England	Live Lounge	"My Universe" · "The Scientist" · "Human Heart" · "Just for Me"	
7 December 2021	England	In Concert	"Higher Power" · "Clocks" · "Fix You" · "Viva la Vida" · "Human Heart" · "People of the Pride" · "Yellow" · "My Universe" · "A Sky Full of Stars" · "Coloratura" · "Magic" · "Christmas Lights"	
3 February 2025	England	Piano Room	"Paradise" · "The Karate Kid" "Feelslikeimfallinginlove" · "Viva la Vida" · "All My Love" · "Sunshine on Leith"	

== Other live performances ==
=== 1990s ===
List of concerts in the 1990s
Date	Venue	City (Note: All concerts held in England except for 9 and 10 November 1999, which were held in Scotland.)	Description	Ref.
1 October 1997	Covent Garden	London	Impromptu performance †	
16 January 1998	The Laurel Tree	London	Debut performance	
22 February 1998	Dublin Castle	London	Second performance	
14 March 1998	The Laurel Tree	London	Third performance	
25 May 1998	Dingwalls	London	First performance after Phil Harvey began to manage the band	
20 July 1998	12 Bar Club	London	Co-headlined with the Fantastic Super Foofs, Keane and Will Shield	
1 September 1998	The Camden Falcon	London	One-off performance	
7 December 1998	The Barfly	London	Co-headlined with the Fantastic Super Foofs	
18 January 1999	Bull & Gate	London	One-off performance	
5 February 1999	The Point	Oxford	Co-headlined with Papanappy	
4 March 1999	The Borderline	London	One-off performance	
31 March 1999	Bull & Gate	London	One-off performance	
1 April 1999	Bull & Gate	London	Private performance for Fierce Panda	
5 April 1999	The Forum	London	Opening slot for Catatonia	
1 June 1999	University of London Union	London	First performance after the band signed with Parlophone	
5 June 1999	Trinity College	Oxford	Trinity 99 Commemoration Ball	
1 July 1999	The Roadhouse	Manchester	First time the band signed autographs	
2 July 1999	Telford's Warehouse	Chester	One-off performance	
26 October 1999	The Roadhouse	Manchester	Co-headlining tour with Bellatrix	
30 October 1999	Esquires Bedford	Bedford	Co-headlining tour with Bellatrix	
2 November 1999	The Louisiana	Bristol	Co-headlining tour with Bellatrix	
3 November 1999	Princess Charlotte	Leicester	Co-headlining tour with Bellatrix	
4 November 1999	Shepherd's Bush Empire	London	Opening slot for Shack and Witness	
5 November 1999	The Little Civic	Wolverhampton	Co-headlining tour with Bellatrix	
7 November 1999	Duchess of York	Leeds	Co-headlining tour with Bellatrix	
9 November 1999	Attic	Edinburgh	Co-headlining tour with Bellatrix	
10 November 1999	King Tut's Wah Wah Hut	Glasgow	Co-headlining tour with Bellatrix	
12 November 1999	Tunbridge Wells Forum	Tunbridge Wells	Co-headlining tour with Bellatrix	

=== 2000s ===
List of concerts in the 2000s
Date	City	Country	Description	Ref.
17 January 2000	Glasgow	Scotland	NME Premier Tour	
18 January 2000	Leeds	England	NME Premier Tour	
19 January 2000	Newcastle	England	NME Premier Tour	
21 January 2000	Leicester	England	NME Premier Tour	
22 January 2000	Manchester	England	NME Premier Tour	
23 January 2000	Sheffield	England	NME Premier Tour	
25 January 2000	Cardiff	Wales	NME Premier Tour	
26 January 2000	Bristol	England	NME Premier Tour	
27 January 2000	Oxford	England	NME Premier Tour	
29 January 2000	Norwich	England	NME Premier Tour	
30 January 2000	London	England	NME Premier Tour	
13 March 2000	London	England	Opening slot for Ocean Colour Scene	
14 March 2000	Nottingham	England	Co-headlining tour with Terris (Note: The concerts in Bristol, Wolverhampton and Liverpool on 21, 22 and 23 March 2000 were cancelled due to illness.)	
15 March 2000	Leicester	England	Co-headlining tour with Terris	
16 March 2000	Oxford	England	Co-headlining tour with Terris	
17 March 2000	Tunbridge Wells	England	Co-headlining tour with Terris	
18 March 2000	Exeter	England	Co-headlining tour with Terris	
20 March 2000	Brighton	England	Co-headlining tour with Terris	
25 March 2000	Glasgow	Scotland	Co-headlining tour with Terris	
26 March 2000	Edinburgh	Scotland	Co-headlining tour with Terris	
27 March 2000	Middlesbrough	England	Co-headlining tour with Terris	
28 March 2000	Manchester	England	Co-headlining tour with Terris	
29 March 2000	Stoke-on-Trent	England	Co-headlining tour with Terris	
31 March 2000	Blackwood	Wales	Co-headlining tour with Terris	
1 April 2000	Bedford	England	Co-headlining tour with Terris	
2 April 2000	Southampton	England	Co-headlining tour with Terris	
3 April 2000	Norwich	England	Co-headlining tour with Terris	
5 April 2000	Northampton	England	Co-headlining tour with Terris	
6 April 2000	Colchester	England	Co-headlining tour with Terris	
7 April 2000	London	England	Co-headlining tour with Terris	
8 April 2000	Cardiff	Wales	Opening slot for Idlewild	
5 May 2000	Blackpool	England	Opening slot for Embrace	
25 May 2000 (Note: The concert in Harlow on 25 May 2000 was broadcast on radio by BBC Radio 1.)	Harlow	England	One-off performance	
29 May 2000	Portsmouth	England	Opening slot for Muse	
30 May 2000	Liverpool	England	Opening slot for Muse	
31 May 2000	Newcastle	England	Opening slot for Muse	
2 June 2000	Glasgow	Scotland	Opening slot for Muse	
3 June 2000	Sheffield	England	Opening slot for Muse	
4 June 2000	Wolverhampton	England	Opening slot for Muse	
6 June 2000	London	England	Opening slot for Muse	
7 June 2000	London	England	Opening slot for Muse	
14 September 2002	Atlanta	United States	Impromptu performance at the Masquerade	
29 October 2002	London	England	Charity performance for Make Trade Fair	
6 December 2002	Tokyo	Japan	Private performance for J-Wave	
5 March 2003	Oxford	United States	Private performance for 97X	
24 March 2003	London	England	Charity performance for Teenage Cancer Trust	
27 January 2005	London	England	Private performance for Parlophone ‡	
4 March 2005	London	England	Private performance for family, friends and select fans	
11 March 2005	West Hollywood	United States	Secret performance at the Troubadour	
6 April 2005	Amsterdam	Netherlands	Secret performance at the Melkweg	
7 April 2005	Cologne	Germany	Secret performance at the Gloria-Theater	
11 April 2005	Madrid	Spain	Secret performance at Sala Pachá	
19 April 2005 (Note: The concert in London on 19 April 2005 was broadcast on television by MTV Live.)	London	England	Secret performance at the Round Chapel	
29 April 2005	Paradise	United States	Warm-up performance for the Twisted Logic Tour	
4 May 2005	San Francisco	United States	Warm-up performance for the Twisted Logic Tour	
6 May 2005	Chicago	United States	Warm-up performance for the Twisted Logic Tour	
11 May 2005	Toronto	Canada	Warm-up performance for the Twisted Logic Tour	
13 May 2005	Boston	United States	Warm-up performance for the Twisted Logic Tour	
17 May 2005	New York City	United States	Warm-up performance for the Twisted Logic Tour	
25 May 2005	New York City	United States	Charity performance for the Robin Hood Foundation with Stevie Wonder ‡	
6 June 2005	London	England	Warm-up performance for the Twisted Logic Tour	
9 June 2005	Paris	France	Warm-up performance for the Twisted Logic Tour	
26 September 2006	London	England	Guest performance at Jay-Z's Royal Albert Hall concert ‡	
5 June 2008 (Note: The concert in Amsterdam on 5 June 2008 was broadcast on radio by NPO 3FM.)	Amsterdam	Netherlands	Private performance for select fans	
13 June 2008	London	England	Private performance for family, friends and select fans	
16 June 2008 (Note: The concert in London on 16 June 2008 was broadcast on radio by BBC Radio 1.)	London	England	Private performance for select fans	
17 June 2008	Barcelona	Spain	Private performance for select fans	
23 June 2008	New York City	United States	Private performance for select fans	
17 July 2008	Los Angeles	United States	Private performance for KROQ-FM	
18 February 2009	London	England	Charity performance for War Child	
15 October 2009	New York City	United States	Charity performance for Keep a Child Alive ‡	

=== 2010s ===
List of concerts in the 2010s
Date	City	Country	Description	Ref.
1 September 2010	San Francisco	United States	Guest performance at the Apple Special Event ‡	
13 September 2010	New York City	United States	Guest performance at Jay-Z and Eminem's Home & Home Tour ‡	
19 December 2010	Liverpool	England	Charity performance for Crisis	
20 December 2010	Newcastle	England	Charity performance for Crisis	
31 December 2010	Paradise	United States	New Year's Eve performance with Jay-Z	
13 April 2011	London	England	Secret performance at the Boogaloo ‡	
31 May 2011	London	England	Private performance for family, friends and select fans	
3 August 2011 (Note: The concert in Los Angeles on 3 August 2011 was partially broadcast on Jimmy Kimmel Live!.)	Los Angeles	United States	Charity performance for the Grammy Foundation	
5 October 2011 (Note: The concert in Cape Town on 5 October 2011 grossed $2.82 million from 46,670 tickets sold.)	Cape Town	South Africa	One-off performance at the Cape Town Stadium with the Parlotones	
8 October 2011 (Note: The concert in Johannesburg on 8 October 2011 grossed $3.29 million from 60,095 tickets sold.)	Johannesburg	South Africa	One-off performance at the FNB Stadium with the Parlotones	
19 October 2011	Cupertino	United States	Memorial performance for Steve Jobs	
27 October 2011 (Note: Not to be confused with the performance held at the Live Lounge, which happened on the same day as part of its namesake radio show.)	London	England	BBC Radio 1 Student Tour	
10 December 2011	London	England	Charity performance for Kids Company	
31 December 2011	Abu Dhabi	United Arab Emirates	New Year's Eve performance	
8 February 2012	Los Angeles	United States	Charity performance for iHeartMedia	
15 November 2012 (Note: The concert in Sydney on 15 November 2012 was broadcast on the internet by 2Day FM.)	Sydney	Australia	Private performance for Huawei	
6 June 2013	London	England	Guest performance at the Ormeley Dinner ‡	
27 June 2013	Old Windsor	England	Charity performance for the Elton John AIDS Foundation ‡	
5 November 2013	Hollywood	United States	Secret performance at Hotel Café ‡	
9 November 2013	New York City	United States	Charity performance for the Michael J. Fox Foundation ‡	
16 December 2013	London	England	Impromptu performance at Ring O' Bells	
19 December 2013	London	England	Charity performance for Kids Company	
21 March 2014 (Note: The concerts in Culver City on 21, 22 and 23 March 2014 were recorded for Ghost Stories Live 2014.)	Culver City	United States	Private performance for family, friends and select fans	
22 March 2014	Culver City	United States	Private performance for family, friends and select fans	
23 March 2014	Culver City	United States	Private performance for family, friends and select fans	
17 June 2014	Sydney	Australia	Music video performance for "A Sky Full of Stars"	
6 August 2014	New York City	United States	Private performance for WRRV ‡	
10 September 2014	Minneapolis	United States	Private performance for Target with Taylor Swift	
17 September 2014	Los Angeles	United States	Private performance for CBS Radio	
1 December 2014	New York City	United States	Guest performance at U2's World AIDS Day concert ‡	
14 December 2014	New York City	United States	Guest performance at the Unbroken release party ‡	
10 January 2015	Beverly Hills	United States	Charity performance for the Community Organized Relief Effort ‡	
6 June 2015	Wilmington	United States	Funeral performance for Beau Biden ‡	
1 July 2015	New Delhi	India	Impromptu performance at the Summerhouse Café ‡	
13 November 2015	Los Angeles	United States	Impromptu performance at the Belasco Theater	
9 December 2015	Paris	France	Private performance for select fans	
24 February 2016	London	England	Charity performance for War Child	
24 April 2016	Santa Monica	United States	Charity performance for Chords 2 Cure ‡	
30 April 2016	Oakland	United States	Charity performance for Notes & Words	
19 May 2016	Orlando	United States	Private performance for SAP	
4 June 2016 (Note: Not to be confused with the general public performance, held on the same day and venue as part of the Head Full of Dreams Tour.)	Manchester	England	Nova Red Room Global Tour	
21 June 2016	Antibes	France	Private performance for iHeartMedia ‡	
28 June 2016	London	England	Charity performance for Sentebale	
30 July 2016	Cape Cod	United States	Private performance for WWBX ‡	
7 August 2016	East Hampton	United States	Charity performance for the Wounded Warrior Project	
17 September 2016	London	England	Charity performance for Lumos ‡	
22 October 2016	Malibu	United States	Charity performance for the Boys & Girls Club of America ‡	
11 November 2016	London	England	Private performance for Absolute Radio	
14 November 2016	London	England	Private performance for Spotify	
21 December 2016	New York City	United States	Charity performance for the Bowery Mission ‡	
27 December 2016	London	England	Charity performance for Crisis ‡	
16 February 2017	Beverly Hills	United States	Charity performance for the Women's Cancer Research Foundation ‡	
30 April 2017	Newport Beach	United States	Charity performance for the Charlize Theron Africa Outreach Project ‡	
6 May 2017	Los Angeles	United States	Charity performance for UCLA Mattel Children's Hospital ‡	
13 October 2017	Beverly Hills	United States	Charity performance for AmfAR ‡	
15 May 2017	New York City	United States	Charity performance for the Robin Hood Foundation	
26 April 2018	London	England	Charity performance for the Rhythm Studio Foundation †	
15 September 2018	Sonoma	United States	Charity performance for the Leonardo DiCaprio Foundation ‡	
27 September 2018	Los Angeles	United States	Guest performance at the Los Angeles Philharmonic Anniversary Gala ‡	
6 October 2018	Los Angeles	United States	Guest performance at Will Ferrell's Best Night of Your Life concert ‡	
28 June 2019	Pilton	England	Guest performance at Stormzy's Glastonbury Festival concert ‡	
30 June 2019	Pilton	England	Guest performance at Kylie Minogue's Glastonbury Festival concert ‡	
24 July 2019	Antibes	France	Charity performance for the Elton John AIDS Foundation ‡	
29 July 2019	Castelvetrano	Italy	Private performance for Google ‡	
12 October 2019	Los Angeles	United States	Charity performance for Gorillapalooza ‡	

=== 2020s ===
List of concerts in the 2020s
Date	City	Country	Description	Ref.
17 January 2020	Los Angeles	United States	Guest performance at KROQ-FM's HD Radio Sound Space	
20 January 2020	Los Angeles	United States	Charity performance for Reform LA Jails	
16 March 2020	Los Angeles	United States	Livestream performance on Instagram for Together at Home ‡	
8 May 2020	Los Angeles	United States	Livestream performance on Instagram for Together at Home ‡	
14 October 2020	Berlin	Germany	Livestream performance on Instagram for Every Vote Counts	
5 May 2021	Malibu	United States	Livestream performance on Dell Technologies World 2021 ‡	
15 May 2021	London	England	Livestream performance on Twitch for Drumathon †	
24 May 2021	London	England	Livestream performance on TikTok for Red Nose Day	
22 June 2021	London	England	Livestream performance on Instagram	
14 August 2021	New York City	United States	Private performance for Spotify ‡	
5 September 2021	London	England	Livestream performance on Joytopia for BMW	
26 October 2021	Dubai	United Arab Emirates	Guest performance at Giorgio Armani's One Night Only ‡	
18 November 2021	Los Angeles	United States	Private performance for Audacy	
2 December 2021	Inglewood	United States	Guest performance at BTS' Permission to Dance on Stage ‡	
4 December 2021	London	England	Livestream performance on Coupang Play	
7 January 2022	Los Angeles	United States	Livestream performance on YouTube for Hal Walker ‡	
15 February 2022	Dubai	United Arab Emirates	Guest performance at the Programme for People and Planet	
20 March 2022	Melbourne	Australia	Funeral performance for Shane Warne ‡	
21 May 2022	London	England	Livestream performance on Twitch for Drumathon †	
26 June 2022	Hinton Charterhouse	England	Impromptu performance at the Stag Inn ‡	
24 February 2024	Rancho Santa Fe	United States	Charity performance for the Challenged Athletes Foundation ‡	
5 March 2024	Los Angeles	United States	Charity performance for the Community Organized Relief Effort ‡	
10 June 2024	Athens	Greece	Music video performance for "Feelslikeimfallinginlove"	
28 August 2024	Dublin	Ireland	Music video performance for "We Pray" ‡	
21 September 2024	Paradise	United States	Lyric video performance for "All My Love" ‡	
24 September 2024	Malibu	United States	Private performance for KROQ-FM ‡	
8 October 2024	New York City	United States	Impromptu performance at Rough Trade	
24 October 2024	London	England	Livestream performance on Fortnite	
9 December 2024	London	England	Guest performance at Jacob Collier's O2 Arena concert ‡	
10 December 2024	London	England	Charity performance for Crisis ‡	
2 April 2025	Los Angeles	United States	Guest performance at the Sierra Club Trail Blazers Ball ‡	
14 August 2025	Sowerby Bridge	England	Impromptu performance at the Puzzle Hall Inn ‡	
22 September 2025	Exeter	England	Charity performance for InFocus ‡	
2 November 2025	Buenos Aires	Argentina	Guest performance at Tini's Tecnópolis concert ‡	
3 December 2025	London	England	Charity performance for Crisis and War Child ‡	
5 December 2025	Paris	France	Charity performance for Le Projet Imagine ‡	
13 December 2025	Rugeley	England	Impromptu performance at Blithfield Lakeside Barns ‡	
16 December 2025	London	England	Impromptu performance at the Choose Love Store ‡	
14 March 2026	Los Angeles	United States	Private performance for select fans	
18 April 2026	Culver City	United States	Charity performance for the Venice Family Clinic ‡	
27 April 2026	San Francisco	United States	Charity performance for Bring Change to Mind ‡	
30 April 2026	London	England	Private performance for select fans	
1 May 2026	London	England	Private performance for select fans	
23 August 2026	Los Angeles	United States	Guest performance at Gustavo Dudamel's Concert for Venezuela ‡	
15 December 2026	London	England	Charity performance for Crisis and Choose Love ‡	

== See also ==
- List of highest-grossing live music artists
- List of highest-grossing concert tours
- List of highest-grossing concert series at a single venue
- List of most-attended concert tours
- List of most-attended concert series at a single venue
- List of most-attended concerts
