= Parachutes Tour =

2000–2001 concert tour by Coldplay

- Tour by Coldplay
- Promotional poster
- Location: Asia; Europe; North America; Oceania
- Associated album: Parachutes
- Start date: 8 June 2000
- End date: 9 December 2001
- No. of shows: 131
- Attendance: 262,140
- Box office: $4.2 million (Note: $7.64 million in 2025 dollars.)
- Website: coldplay.com

Coldplay concert chronology
- Parachutes Tour (2000–2001); A Rush of Blood to the Head Tour (2002–2003)

The Parachutes Tour was the first concert tour undertaken by British rock band Coldplay. It was announced on 1 June 2000 in support of their debut album, Parachutes (2000), following the unnamed concert run they co-headlined with Welsh band Terris. They mostly performed at clubs, theatres and festivals, while the set list included all tracks from the concert run's namesake album along with songs from The Blue Room (1999), covers and unreleased material.

== Background ==
After numerous one-off performances and a few shows with Bellatrix in support of The Blue Room (1999), Coldplay was part of the NME Premier Tour in January 2000 and embarked on a co-headlining run with Terris in March. On 27 April 2000, the band announced their first headlining tour would be coming to the United Kingdom right after supporting Muse at Showbiz Tour.

== Opening acts ==
Except for London, English band Lowgold were the supporting act for all October 2000 performances. On 18 December, the guests included Bettina Motive and the Fantastic Super Foofs. During the first North American leg, Lily Frost was the opener in Vancouver and remaining dates had Powderfinger. Grandaddy was invited for the continent's second run. Mercedes, JJ72 and Swan Lee were featured in the shows at Club Ifor Bach, Ancienne Belgique, and Vega, respectively.

== Reception ==
In total, the tour grossed $4,201,871 from 262,140 tickets sold. Billboard also commented the performances held in 2001 earned an average of $52,743 from 2,507 tickets per date.

== Set list ==
This set list was taken from the 23 October 2000 concert in London, England. It does not represent all shows throughout the tour.

1. "Spies"
2. "Trouble"
3. "Bigger Stronger"
4. "High Speed"
5. "Shiver"
6. "Animals"
7. "Sparks"
8. "Don't Panic"
9. "Help Is Round the Corner"
10. "Yellow"
11. "Everything's Not Lost"

Encore

12. "We Never Change"
13. "In My Place"

== Tour dates ==
List of 2000 concerts
Date (2000)	City	Country	Venue
8 June	Leeds	England	The Cockpit
10 June	Oxford	England	The Zodiac
11 June	Southampton	England	The Joiners
14 June	Exeter	England	Cavern Club
15 June	Leicester	England	Princess Charlotte
18 June	Manchester	England	University of Manchester
19 June	London	England	Scala
21 June	Bristol	England	The Fleece
22 June	Cardiff	Wales	Club Ifor Bach
24 June (Note: The concert in Pilton on 24 June 2000 was part of the Glastonbury Festival.)	Pilton	England	Worthy Farm
26 June	Amsterdam	Netherlands	Paradiso
7 July (Note: The concert in Belfort on 7 July 2000 was part of the Eurockéennes festival.)	Belfort	France	Presqu'île de Malsaucy
9 July (Note: The concert in Kinross on 9 July 2000 was part of the T in the Park festival.)	Kinross	Scotland	Balado
11 July (Note: The concert in Paris on 11 July 2000 was originally planned for 28 May 2000 at La Maroquinerie, but it was rescheduled due to unknown reasons.)	Paris	France	La Scène Bastille
14 July (Note: The concert in Villafranca di Verona on 14 July 2000 was part of the Rockaforte Festival.)	Villafranca di Verona	Italy	Castello Scaligero
16 July (Note: The concert in Misterbianco on 16 July 2000 was part of the Sonica Festival.)	Misterbianco	Italy	Piazza Pertini
27 July (Note: The concert in Barcelona on 27 July 2000 was a free promotional performance.)	Barcelona	Spain	La Zeleste
30 July (Note: The concert in Birmingham on 30 July 2000 was part of the Ronnie Scott's Songwriters Festival.)	Birmingham	England	Ronnie Scott's
31 July (Note: The concert in Norwich on 31 July 2000 was originally planned for 23 May 2000, but it was rescheduled due to unknown reasons.)	Norwich	England	Norwich Arts Centre
5 August (Note: The concert in Fujiyoshida on 5 August 2000 was part of the Summer Sonic Festival.)	Fujiyoshida (Note: Labelled as Tokyo in promotional material.)	Japan	Fujikyu Conifer Forest
13 August (Note: The concert in Paredes de Coura on 13 August 2000 was part of the Paredes de Coura Festival.)	Paredes de Coura	Portugal	Praia Fluvial do Taboão
18 August (Note: The concert in Weeze on 18 August 2000 was part of the Bizarre Festival.)	Weeze	Germany	Weeze Airport
19 August (Note: The concerts in Chelmsford and Weston-under-Lizard on 19 and 20 August 2000 were part of the V Festival.)	Chelmsford	England	Hylands Park
20 August	Weston-under-Lizard (Note: Labelled as Staffordshire in promotional material.)	England	Weston Park
25 August (Note: The concert in Biddinghuizen on 25 August 2000 was part of the Lowlands festival.)	Biddinghuizen	Netherlands	Spijk en Bremerberg
26 August (Note: The concert in Hasselt on 26 August 2000 was part of the Pukkelpop festival.)	Hasselt	Belgium	Kiewit
1 September (Note: The concert in Pilton on 1 September 2000 was part of the Pilton Party festival.)	Pilton	England	Pilton Playing Field
26 September (Note: The concert in London on 26 September 2000 was a free performance co-headlined with Mansun, Placebo, Reef and Toploader.)	London	England	Millennium Dome Skyscape
2 October	Cambridge	England	The Junction
3 October	Oxford	England	Oxford Brookes University
4 October	Leicester	England	De Montfort University
6 October	Liverpool	England	Royal Court Theatre
8 October	Belfast	Northern Ireland	Ulster Hall
9 October	Dublin	Ireland	The Olympia Theatre
10 October	Glasgow	Scotland	Barrowland Ballroom
12 October	Newcastle	England	Newcastle University
14 October	Sheffield	England	The Leadmill
15 October	Manchester	England	Manchester Academy
16 October	Leeds	England	Leeds Metropolitan University
18 October	Wolverhampton	England	Wulfrun Hall
19 October	Bristol	England	Anson Rooms
20 October	Portsmouth	England	Portsmouth Pyramids Centre
22 October	London	England	Shepherd's Bush Empire
23 October	London	England	Shepherd's Bush Empire
25 October (Note: The concert in Cardiff on 25 October 2000 was part of BBC Radio 1's Sound City.)	Cardiff	Wales	Cardiff University
3 November	Brussels	Belgium	Ancienne Belgique
4 November (Note: The concert in Amsterdam on 4 November 2000 was part of the Crossing Border Festival.)	Amsterdam	Netherlands	Melkweg The Max
7 November	Milan	Italy	Alcatraz
9 November (Note: The concerts in Lille, Paris, Nantes and Toulouse on 9, 10, 11 and 13 November 2000 were part of the Les Inrockuptibles Festival.)	Lille	France	L'Aeronef
10 November	Paris	France	La Cigale
11 November	Nantes	France	L'Olympic
13 November	Toulouse	France	Le Bikini
14 November (Note: The concert in Paris on 14 November 2000 was a free promotional performance for Virgin Megastores.)	Paris	France	Virgin Megastore Champs Elysees
16 November	Barcelona	Spain	Bikini
17 November (Note: The concert in Barcelona on 17 November 2000 was part of the Pop Attack Festival.)	Barcelona	Spain	Sala Apolo
29 November	Stockholm	Sweden	Kägelbanan
30 November	Bergen	Norway	Garage
1 December (Note: The concert in Oslo on 1 December 2000 was originally planned to be held at John Dee, but it was moved to Rockefeller Music Hall due to high demand.)	Oslo	Norway	Rockefeller Music Hall
3 December	Copenhagen	Denmark	Vega
5 December (Note: The concerts in Hamburg and Berlin on 5 and 6 December 2000 were part of the Rolling Stone Roadshow.)	Hamburg	Germany	Große Freiheit 36
6 December	Berlin	Germany	Columbiahalle
14 December (Note: The concert in Edinburgh on 14 December 2000 was originally planned for 11 October 2000, but it was rescheduled due to illness.)	Edinburgh	Scotland	The Liquid Room
16 December (Note: The concert in Los Angeles on 16 December 2000 was part of the KROQ Almost Acoustic Christmas festival.)	Los Angeles	United States	Universal Amphitheatre
18 December	London	England	The Forum

List of 2001 concerts (Note: The concerts in the United States in November and December 2001 were originally planned for September 2001, but they were rescheduled due to the September 11 attacks.)
Date (2001)	City	Country	Venue
19 January (Note: The concerts in Auckland, Gold Coast, Sydney, Melbourne, Adelaide and Perth on 19, 21, 26, 28 January and 2, 4 February 2001 were part of the Big Day Out festival.)	Auckland	New Zealand	Ericsson Stadium
21 January	Gold Coast	Australia	Gold Coast Parklands
24 January	Sydney	Australia	Metro Club
26 January	Sydney	Australia	Sydney Showground Stadium
28 January	Melbourne	Australia	RAS Showgrounds
29 January	Melbourne	Australia	Prince of Wales Hotel
2 February	Adelaide	Australia	RA&HS Showgrounds
4 February	Perth	Australia	Bassendean Oval
8 February	Vancouver	Canada	Commodore Ballroom
9 February	Seattle	United States	The Showbox
10 February	Portland	United States	Roseland Theatre
12 February	San Francisco	United States	The Fillmore
13 February	Los Angeles	United States	Mayan Theater
14 February	Los Angeles	United States	Mayan Theater
19 February	Chicago	United States	Riviera Theater
9 April (Note: The concert in New York City on 9 April 2001 was originally planned to be held at Irving Plaza on 16 February 2001, but it was cut short and rescheduled due to illness.)	New York City	United States	Roseland Ballroom
25 March (Note: The concert in Aberdeen on 25 March 2001 was originally planned for 15 December 2000 at The Lemon Tree, but it was rescheduled due to appointment conflicts.)	Aberdeen	Scotland	Live City Hall
23 April	Aberdeen	Scotland	Music Hall
24 April	Edinburgh	Scotland	Edinburgh Corn Exchange
26 April	Manchester	England	Manchester Apollo
27 April	Manchester	England	Manchester Apollo
29 April	Brixton	England	Brixton Academy
30 April (Note: The concert in Brixton on 30 April 2001 was broadcast on radio by BBC Radio 1.)	Brixton	England	Brixton Academy
24 May	Boston	United States	Avalon
26 May (Note: The concert in Foxborough on 26 May 2001 was part of the WBCN River Rave festival.)	Foxborough (Note: Labelled as Boston in promotional material.)	United States	Foxboro Stadium
27 May (Note: The concerts in Washington, D.C. on 27 and 28 May 2001 were part of the HFStival.)	Washington, D.C.	United States	RFK Stadium
28 May	Washington, D.C.	United States	RFK Stadium
30 May	Atlanta	United States	The Tabernacle
2 June (Note: The concert in Philadelphia on 2 June 2001 was filmed for Reverb.)	Philadelphia	United States	The Electric Factory
4 June	Montreal	Canada	Métropolis
5 June (Note: The concert in Toronto on 5 June 2001 was originally planned for 20 February 2001, but it was rescheduled due to illness.)	Toronto	Canada	The Warehouse
7 June	Detroit	United States	State Theatre
8 June	Chicago	United States	Aragon Ballroom
10 June	Dallas	United States	Bronco Bowl
11 June	Austin	United States	The Backyard
13 June	Denver	United States	Fillmore Auditorium
16 June	Portland	United States	Arlene Schnitzer Concert Hall
17 June	Vancouver	Canada	Orpheum Theatre
18 June	Seattle	United States	Benaroya Hall
20 June	San Francisco	United States	The Warfield
23 June (Note: The concert in Irvine on 23 June 2001 was part of the KROQ Weenie Roast festival.)	Irvine	United States	Verizon Amphitheater
24 June	Los Angeles	United States	Wiltern Theatre
28 June	New York City	United States	Radio City Music Hall
3 July (Note: The concert in Kristiansand on 3 July 2001 was part of the Quart Festival.)	Kristiansand	Norway	Idrettsplassen
8 July (Note: The concert in Kinross on 8 July 2001 was part of the T in the Park festival.)	Kinross	Scotland	Balado
29 July (Note: The concert in Singapore on 29 July 2001 was co-headlined with Travis.)	Singapore		Singapore Indoor Stadium
2 August	Fremantle	Australia	Metropolis Fremantle
4 August	Adelaide	Australia	Thebarton Theatre
5 August	Melbourne	Australia	Festival Hall
7 August	Sydney	Australia	Enmore Theatre
8 August	Sydney	Australia	Hordern Pavilion
10 August	Brisbane	Australia	Brisbane Festival Hall
12 August	Auckland	New Zealand	St. James Theatre
18 August (Note: The concerts in Chelmsford and Weston-under-Lizard on 18 and 19 August 2001 were part of the V Festival.)	Chelmsford	England	Hylands Park
19 August	Weston-under-Lizard	England	Weston Park
22 August	Reykjavík	Iceland	Laugardalshöll
25 August (Note: The concert in Slane on 25 August 2001 was part of the Slane Festival.)	Slane	Ireland	Slane Castle
2 September (Note: The concert in Leicester on 2 September 2001 was part of BBC Radio 1's One Big Sunday.)	Leicester	England	Victoria Park
28 November (Note: The concert in Providence on 28 November 2001 was part of WBRU's 32nd Birthday Bash.)	Providence	United States	Veterans Memorial Auditorium
30 November	Chicago	United States	Chicago Theatre
1 December (Note: The concert in Fairfax on 1 December 2001 was part of the WHFS HFSmas Nutcracker festival.)	Fairfax	United States	Patriot Center
3 December (Note: The concert in Boston on 3 December 2001 was part of the WNYR Holiday Hoedown festival.)	Boston	United States	FleetCenter
4 December	New York City	United States	Irving Plaza
5 December	New York City	United States	Irving Plaza
7 December (Note: The concert in Seattle on 7 December 2001 was part of the Deck the Hall Ball.)	Seattle	United States	Paramount Theatre
8 December (Note: The concert in San Diego on 8 December 2001 was part of the 91X Frosty the Show, Man festival.)	San Diego	United States	4th and B
9 December (Note: The concert in Los Angeles on 9 December 2001 was part of the KROQ Almost Acoustic Christmas festival.)	Los Angeles	United States	Universal Amphitheatre

== Cancelled shows ==
List of cancelled concerts
Date	City	Country	Venue	Reason	Ref.
2 September 2000 (Note: The concert in Bologna on 2 September 2000 was originally planned to be part of the Independent Days Festival.)	Bologna	Italy	Arena Parco Nord	Illness	
11 November 2000	Nantes	France	FNAC Nantes	Unknown	
13 November 2000	Toulouse	France	FNAC Toulouse Wilson	Unknown	
7 December 2000 (Note: The concerts in Leipzig, Munich, Cologne and Offenbach on 7, 8, 10 and 11 December 2000 were originally planned to be part of the Rolling Stone Roadshow.)	Leipzig	Germany	Haus Auensee	Exhaustion	
8 December 2000	Munich	Germany	Colosseum	Exhaustion	
10 December 2000	Cologne	Germany	Live Music Hall	Exhaustion	
11 December 2000	Offenbach	Germany	Capital	Exhaustion	
17 February 2001	Boston	United States	Avalon	Illness	
23 February 2001	Miami	United States	Hard Rock Cafe	Illness	
1 April 2001	Paris	France	Le Bataclan	Illness	
2 April 2001	Bordeaux	France	Krakatoa	Illness	
3 April 2001	Madrid	Spain	La Riviera	Illness	
11 April 2001	Munich	Germany	Babylon	Illness	
13 April 2001	Berlin	Germany	Columbiahalle	Illness	
14 April 2001	Hamburg	Germany	Docks	Illness	
15 April 2001 (Note: The concert in Düsseldorf on 15 April 2001 was originally planned to be part of the WDR Festival.)	Düsseldorf	Germany	Philips Halle	Illness	
17 April 2001	Modena	Italy	Vox Club	Illness	
18 April 2001	Marseille	France	Espace Julien	Illness	
14 June 2001	Salt Lake City	United States	Bricks	Illness	
1 July 2001 (Note: The concert in Werchter on 1 July 2001 was originally planned to be part of the Rock Werchter festival.)	Werchter	Belgium	Festivalpark Werchter	Unknown	

== Boxscores ==
List of reported boxscores
City	Venue	Attendance	Revenue
Vancouver	Commodore Ballroom	900 / 900	$10,843
Seattle	The Showbox	1,114 / 1,114	$14,075
Portland	Roseland Theatre	1,338 / 1,338	$16,825
San Francisco	The Fillmore	1,250 / 1,250	$18,750
Los Angeles	Mayan Theater	3,198 / 3,198 (Note: Report based on two shows instead of one.)	$47,970
Chicago	Riviera Theater	2,500 / 2,500	$35,193
New York City	Roseland Ballroom	3,416 / 3,679	$56,423
Boston	Avalon	1,904 / 1,920	$24,276
Toronto	The Warehouse	2,456 / 2,456	$29,690
Detroit	State Theatre	2,989 / 2,989	$62,419
Chicago	Aragon Ballroom	4,500 / 4,500	$90,000
Austin	The Backyard	3,626 / 4,250	$67,760
Portland	Arlene Schnitzer Concert Hall	1,766 / 2,616	$39,897
Vancouver	Orpheum Theatre	2,543 / 2,543	$54,988
Seattle	Benaroya Hall	2,302 / 2,302	$57,638
San Francisco	The Warfield	2,250 / 2,250	$50,625
Los Angeles	Wiltern Theatre	2,109 / 2,200	$45,344
New York City	Radio City Music Hall	5,955 / 5,955	$177,595
Chicago	Chicago Theatre	3,377 / 3,377	$96,245
New York City	Irving Plaza	2,100 / 2,200	$73,500
Total		51,593 / 53,537 (96.3%)	$1,070,056

== See also ==
- List of Coldplay live performances
- List of highest-grossing live music artists

== Notes ==
Cities

Others
