= Charlie Brown (Coldplay song) =

2011 song by Coldplay

Single by Coldplay

from the album Mylo Xyloto
- Released: 14 November 2011
- Recorded: November 2008
- Genre: Alternative rock; pop rock; power pop
- Length: 4:45 (album version); 3:46 (radio edit)
- Label: Parlophone; Capitol
- Songwriters: Guy Berryman; Jonny Buckland; Will Champion; Brian Eno; Chris Martin
- Producers: Markus Dravs; Daniel Green; Rik Simpson

Coldplay singles chronology
"Paradise" (2011)	"Charlie Brown" (2011)	"Princess of China" (2012)

Music videos
- "Charlie Brown" on YouTube; "Charlie Brown" (live) on YouTube

"Charlie Brown" is a song by British rock band Coldplay. The song was released as the third single from their fifth studio album Mylo Xyloto. The single was listed by Q magazine as their track of the day on 2 December 2011. The music video for the song was released on 3 February 2012, as well as a live version on 6 December 2011. Despite the name, the lyrics have no relation to the Peanuts franchise.

== Background ==
According to the band, "Charlie Brown" was the first song recorded during sessions for the band's then-upcoming fifth studio album, with the intention of being included on what later became Mylo Xyloto.

The lyrics of an early version of the song included a mention of the famous Peanuts character. The character's name, however, "was left out of the final recording but the name stuck as the band couldn't think of an alternative." During the writing and recording sessions of Mylo Xyloto, the song took on other names, such as "Cartoon Heart", before eventually being titled "Charlie Brown". It was written by Chris Martin in his daughter's doll's house. The doll's house was converted into a studio when Martin's daughter said she didn't like it.

== Development ==
During an online interview with the Australian publication Sunday Herald Sun, Coldplay said they were making two records, describing "Charlie Brown" as the centre-piece of the stripped down album the band intended to make along with the electric one they were already calling Mylo Xyloto. They then decided to combine both of the albums because bassist Guy Berryman said that he "will not allow this song to be played on an accordion," as it was originally planned to be.

Coldplay first performed "Charlie Brown" at a "friends and family" gig at The Forum, Kentish Town, London on 31 May 2011. They then continued to play it at multiple shows in 2011, beginning with the Rock im Park festival in Nürnberg, Germany on 3 June 2011 and again at Rock am Ring festival the following day, which was the first live broadcast of the song officially authorised by the band and management. The song became very popular among the festivals crowd. Drummer Will Champion said it had happy memories of playing it over the summer.

== Critical reception ==
=== Reviews ===
"Charlie Brown" received generally positive reviews from critics. In an article published by Q magazine on 10 October 2011 entitled "First Impressions of... Coldplay's Mylo Xyloto", they wrote that "'Charlie Brown' is one of the best things Coldplay have done" and likened the song to the style of U2's The Joshua Tree and "the heady holler-alongs of Arcade Fire". They also named it as their track of the day on 2 December 2011. BBC called Charlie Brown "one of those Coldplay-patented sun-breaking-through-clouds moments" and gave praise to Buckland's guitar riff. Billboard called the song one of the album's best tracks.

Under The Radar praised the song and said "Mylo Xyloto's finest anthem, 'Charlie Brown,' shoots for The Suburbs with the clumsy line 'Stole the key/took a car downtown to where the lost boys meet/took what they offered me' but redeems itself with a massive, ascending guitar hook that I can't help feeling would have sound-tracked any climactic scene from Friday Night Lights beautifully". PopMatters said that the song "absolutely crackled with energy" and felt "it shows the band having stumbled upon one of those great, instantly recognisable melodies that sounds better with each reiteration—who would’ve thought a guitar and a xylophone could sound so epic when paired together".

Will Hermes of Rolling Stone had mixed feelings for the song, and gave the song two and a half stars out of five in his preview of numerous songs from Mylo Xyloto, saying that the song "triangulates Springsteen, U2 and Arcade Fire in a hood-rat oratorio that roars even if Chris Martin's delivery feels too gentle". "Charlie Brown" was later chosen for ESPN's commercials and coverage of Euro 2012. The track was later nominated for Grammy Award for Best Rock Performance at the 2013 Grammy Awards.

=== Rankings ===
List of critic rankings
Publication	Year	Description	Result	Ref.
3voor12	2012	Songs of the Year 2012	26	
La Repubblica	2019	The Key Songs of the 2010s	Placed	
Radio X	2026	Best of British 500	342	

== Music videos ==
On 6 December 2011 Coldplay uploaded a promotional, music video for "Charlie Brown" to their official YouTube account, which utilised footage from a collection of concerts they had performed throughout the band's 2011 Summer Festival Tour. The video was directed by Mat Whitecross and Mark Rowbotham. In the description section of the music video, the band's drummer Will Champion announced that a "proper" video would be released at a later stage.

Screenshot from the final video, showing Antonia Thomas and Elliott Tittensor.

The official music video for "Charlie Brown", to which Champion was referring was filmed with director Mat Whitecross throughout November and December 2011. Additional filming was made in mid to late January 2012. The "Xylobands" conceptual creator for the Mylo Xyloto Tour posted on Twitter that there would be photos from the video uploaded on 2 February 2012 and that the official music video would be posted on VEVO the following morning on 3 February 2012.

The video was released on VEVO, YouTube, Facebook, Twitter, Google+ and their own website at 03.00 am on 3 February 2012. On YouTube, the video received over 700,000 views within the first 24 hours of its release. The video was also met with acclaim from critics, who praised its visuals, themes and fast-paced editing. The video features Shameless star Elliott Tittensor and Misfits star Antonia Thomas.

== Track listing ==
Promotional CD single
No.	Title	Length
1.	"Charlie Brown" (Radio Edit)	3:49
2.	"Charlie Brown" (Album Version)	4:48

Digital download - Remix
No.	Title	Length
1.	"Charlie Brown" (David Audé remix)	6:43

Digital download - Remix
No.	Title	Length
1.	"Charlie Brown" (Jacques Lu Cont remix)	6:18

Digital download - live version
No.	Title	Length
1.	"Charlie Brown" (Live from the BRITs)	3:50

== Credits and personnel ==
Recording

- Recorded at The Bakery and The Beehive, London, UK and Electric Lady Studios, New York.

Mastering

- Mastered at Gateway Studios, United States.

Personnel

- Guy Berryman – composer, bass, backing vocals
- Jonny Buckland – composer, lead guitar, backing vocals
- Will Champion – composer, drums, backing vocals
- Chris Martin – composer, acoustic guitar, piano, lead vocals
- Markus Dravs – producer, programmer
- Daniel Green – producer
- Rik Simpson – producer
- Brian Eno – "enoxification" and additional composition, backing vocals
- Mark "Spike" Stent – mixer
- Matt McGinn – dulcimer
- Davide Rossi – strings

Credits adapted from promotional single liner notes.

- Matt Green – assistant mixer
- Pierre Eiras – assistant mixer
- Dave Emery – assistant mixer
- Olga Fitzroy – assistant mixer
- Robin Baynton – editor, programmer
- Andy Rugg – studio assistant
- Christian Green – studio assistant
- Noah Goldstein – studio assistant
- Ian Shea – studio assistant
- Luis Jardim – percussion
- Bob Ludwig – mastering engineer

== Charts ==
=== Weekly charts ===
Weekly chart performance
Chart (2011–2024)	Peak position
Australia (ARIA)	78
Belgium (Ultratip Bubbling Under Flanders)	2
Belgium (Ultratip Bubbling Under Wallonia)	2
Brazil (Billboard Brasil Hot 100)	41
Brazil Hot Pop Songs	11
CIS Airplay (TopHit)	127
France (SNEP)	148
Hungary (Rádiós Top 40)	11
Iceland (RÚV)	7
Ireland (IRMA)	20
Israel International Airplay (Media Forest)	4
Italy (FIMI)	31
Italy Airplay (EarOne)	2
Mexico Ingles Airplay	7
Netherlands (Dutch Top 40)	25
Netherlands (Single Tip)	20
Portugal (AFP)	149
Scottish Singles Sales (Official Charts)	16
Singapore (RIAS)	22
Slovakia Airplay (ČNS IFPI)	52
South Korea International (Gaon)	24
Sweden Heatseeker (Sverigetopplistan)	5
Switzerland Airplay (Schweizer Hitparade)	9
UK Singles (Official Charts)	22
US Bubbling Under Hot 100 (Billboard)	10
US Adult Alternative Airplay (Billboard)	4
US Alternative Airplay (Billboard)	15
US Hot Rock & Alternative Songs (Billboard)	23
Venezuela Pop Rock General (Record Report)	11

=== Year-end charts ===
Year-end chart performance
Chart (2012)	Position
Italy Airplay (EarOne)	25
US Hot Rock & Alternative Songs (Billboard)	73

== Certifications ==
Certifications
Region	Certification	Certified units/sales
Italy (FIMI)	Gold	15,000^{*}
New Zealand (RMNZ)	Gold	15,000^{‡}
United Kingdom (BPI)	Platinum	600,000^{‡}
^{*} Sales figures based on certification alone.^{‡} Sales+streaming figures based on certification alone.

== Release history ==
Release dates and formats
Region	Date	Format	Label
Worldwide	14 November 2011	Contemporary hit radio	Parlophone
United Kingdom	14 November 2011	Digital Download	Parlophone
Italy	23 January 2012	Contemporary hit radio	Warner Music
United States	23 January 2012	Adult album alternative radio	Capitol
United States	24 January 2012	Modern rock radio	Capitol
United Kingdom	22 February 2012	Digital download (Brit Awards performance)	Brit Awards Ltd.
United Kingdom	25 February 2012	Digital download (David Audé remix)	EMI
