= KROQ Almost Acoustic Christmas =

Annual concert

- Genre: Rock, Metal, Punk, Post-hardcore, Ska, Alternative rock
- Dates: mid-December
- Locations: Universal Amphitheatre (1989–1997, 2000–2012) Shrine Auditorium (1998, 2013); Honda Center (1999, 2019) Kia Forum (2014–2018, 2022–present)
- Years active: 1989–2019, 2022–present
- Founders: KROQ-FM
- Website: KROQ Almost Acoustic Christmas

Almost Acoustic Christmas is an annual concert run by the Los Angeles radio station KROQ-FM. Like the radio station's other festivals (including the Weenie Roast, LA Invasion and Epicenter), it is a festival organized by KROQ-FM to raise money for a charity, and promotes a variety of rock music from the radio station's format, including alternative, indie, punk, pop, dance and hard rock/heavy metal. Since its first show in 1989, the Acoustic Christmas has traditionally been held either the second or third weekend of December, with the exception of a three-year hiatus between 2019 and 2022 due to the COVID-19 pandemic.

== Overview ==
The festival's origins trace back to a December 1989 concert that was called the KROQ Xmas Bash. By the mid-1990s, the festival had become bigger and attracted increasingly popular alternative rock bands and singers. The Almost Acoustic Christmas takes place over a weekend in mid-December, and has in recent years been broadcast for free on KROQ-FM's website. The festival started off as a one-day event, and every year between 1992 and 2019 (with the exception of 1999, which was a one-day event), it was held as a two-day festival. Since its return in 2022 after a three-year hiatus, the Almost Acoustic Christmas has been held as a one-day event.

From 1989 through 2012 the show took place at the Universal Amphitheatre in Universal City, except for 1998 where it was held at the Shrine Auditorium in Los Angeles, and in 1999 where it was held at the Arrowhead Pond in Anaheim. After the Universal Amphitheatre closed in September 2013, the show performed again at the Shrine Auditorium in December 2013. In 2014 the event was moved to Kia Forum (then-The Forum) in Inglewood. In 2019, the show took place at the Honda Center in Anaheim. Due to the COVID-19 pandemic, KROQ Almost Acoustic Christmas did not take place in 2020 and 2021. The show returned to the Kia Forum on December 10, 2022 and has taken place every year since.

KROQ Almost Acoustic Christmas concerts benefit Para Los Ninos and the Al Wooten Jr Heritage Center.

In 1999, a compilation of live recordings, The Best of KROQ's Almost Acoustic Christmas, was released.

On December 18, 2009, KROQ-FM released a compilation called KROQ Almost Acoustic Christmas 2009, a benefit album with proceeds benefiting Para Los Ninos and the Al Wooten Heritage Center.

== Line-ups ==
Bands listed in reverse order of night's performance.

| Date | Lineup |
|---|---|
| December 1, 1990 | Dramarama, Social Distortion, Chris Isaak, the Posies, Soho, the Trash Can Sinatras, the Havalinas |
| December 21, 1991 | Siouxsie and the Banshees, the Smithereens, the Wonder Stuff, Ian McCulloch, Alison Moyet, School of Fish, This Picture |
| December 12–13, 1992 | Night 1 (Saturday): Duran Duran, Soul Asylum, the Violent Femmes, Toad the Wet Sprocket, David Byrne, Suzanne Vega, EMF, the Farm, Cause and Effect Night 2 (Sunday): Duran Duran, the Cult, Adam Ant, Toad the Wet Sprocket, Seal, the Soup Dragons, Michael Penn, the Rembrandts, dada |
| December 11–12, 1993 | Night 1 (Saturday): General Public, Nick Heyward, Billy Idol, the Cranberries, They Might Be Giants, 4 Non Blondes, Tony Bennett, the Lemonheads, Belly, Bad Religion Night 2 (Sunday): Blind Melon, Porno for Pyros, the Smashing Pumpkins, Henry Rollins, the Violent Femmes, Rage Against the Machine, Belly, Primus, the Cranberries, Cracker, US3 |
| December 10–11, 1994 | Night 1 (Saturday): Stone Temple Pilots, Hole, Bad Religion, Mazzy Star, Live, Veruca Salt, the Jesus and Mary Chain, Meat Puppets, Liz Phair, Sunny Day Real Estate, Luscious Jackson Night 2 (Sunday): Simple Minds, the Cranberries, Seal, the Black Crowes, Live, Candlebox, Weezer, Sheryl Crow, Dinosaur Jr., Love Spit Love, Brian Setzer Orchestra |
| December 17–18, 1995 | Night 1 (Sunday): Alanis Morissette, Porno for Pyros, Foo Fighters, Booty Quake, Sonic Youth, the Presidents of the United States of America, Joan Osborne, Wesley Willis, Radiohead, Garbage, Toadies, No Doubt Night 2 (Monday): Bush, Alanis Morissette, Lenny Kravitz, Oasis, Goo Goo Dolls, Radiohead, Joan Osborne, Garbage, Tripping Daisy, the Rentals |
| December 13–14, 1996 | Night 1 (Friday): Natalie Merchant, Sarah McLachlan, Tori Amos, Sheryl Crow, Garbage, Jewel, the Cardigans, Fiona Apple, Poe, Tracy Bonham Night 2 (Saturday): Bush, 311, the Presidents of the United States of America, Beck, Orbital, Cake, Eels, Republica, the Wallflowers |
| December 5–6, 1997 | Night 1 (Friday): Jane's Addiction, No Doubt, Scott Weiland, Sarah McLachlan, Beck, Matchbox Twenty, Rancid, Fiona Apple, Smash Mouth, Blink-182, Sneaker Pimps, Chumbawamba Night 2 (Saturday): David Bowie, Green Day, 311, Live, Sugar Ray, Third Eye Blind, Portishead, Save Ferris, Everclear, the Aquabats |
| December 11–12, 1998 | Night 1 (Friday): Korn, the Offspring, Hole, Sugar Ray, Blink-182, Barenaked Ladies, Reel Big Fish, the Cardigans Night 2 (Saturday): Depeche Mode, Billy Corgan, Garbage, Brian Setzer Orchestra, Goo Goo Dolls, Cake, Soul Coughing, Semisonic, Everlast |
| December 11, 1999 | Bush, Blink-182, Rob Zombie, Beck, Tori Amos, Foo Fighters, 311, Oasis, Fiona Apple, Save Ferris, Powerman 5000 |
| December 16–17, 2000 | Night 1 (Saturday): Papa Roach, No Doubt, Deftones, Weezer, Moby, Incubus (w/ orchestra), Fuel, 3 Doors Down, Coldplay, At the Drive-In Night 2 (Sunday): Green Day, Papa Roach, No Doubt, Deftones, Weezer, Moby, Incubus (w/ orchestra), Everclear, Disturbed, Linkin Park |
| December 8–9, 2001 | Night 1 (Saturday):Linkin Park, Blink-182, Staind, System of a Down, Bad Religion, P.O.D., Sum 41, Puddle of Mudd, Alien Ant Farm Night 2 (Sunday):Linkin Park, Staind (acoustic), Bush, Foo Fighters, 311, No Doubt, Coldplay, Nickelback, Pete Yorn, Remy Zero, Travis (canceled) |
| December 7–8, 2002 | Night 1 (Saturday): P.O.D., Disturbed, Audioslave, Queens of the Stone Age, Sum 41, the Used, Zwan, New Found Glory, Trust Company, Taproot Night 2 (Sunday): Creed, Coldplay, Beck (w/ the Flaming Lips), Jack Johnson, Dashboard Confessional, Good Charlotte, Jimmy Fallon, the Vines, Jurassic 5 |
| December 13–14, 2003 | Night 1 (Saturday): Linkin Park (headliner), the Offspring, P.O.D., AFI, Pennywise, Puddle of Mudd, Chevelle, Thrice, the Distillers Night 2 (Sunday): Korn (headliner), Blink-182, Jane's Addiction, 311, Staind, Rancid, Brand New, Jet, Trapt |
| December 11–12, 2004 | Night 1 (Saturday): Jimmy Eat World, Interpol, the Killers, Franz Ferdinand, Gwen Stefani (special guest), Modest Mouse, Muse, Taking Back Sunday, the Shins, Keane, Snow Patrol, the Music Night 2 (Sunday): Green Day (headliner), Velvet Revolver, Incubus, Social Distortion, Papa Roach, Sum 41, Good Charlotte, the Used, Chevelle, My Chemical Romance, Hoobastank (canceled) |
| December 10–11, 2005 | Night 1 (Saturday): System of a Down (headliner), Nine Inch Nails, Korn, Fall Out Boy, Avenged Sevenfold, Thrice, Rise Against Night 2 (Sunday): Depeche Mode (headliner), Coldplay, the White Stripes, Jack Johnson, the Bravery, Death Cab for Cutie, Hot Hot Heat, Nada Surf |
| December 9–10, 2006 | Night 1 (Saturday): Foo Fighters (headliner), AFI, Incubus, My Chemical Romance, Fall Out Boy, Thirty Seconds to Mars, Papa Roach, +44, Wolfmother, Saosin Night 2 (Sunday): Foo Fighters (headliner), the Killers, Beck, the Raconteurs, Evanescence, Panic! at the Disco, Angels & Airwaves, Gnarls Barkley, Snow Patrol, She Wants Revenge |
| December 8–9, 2007 | Night 1 (Saturday): Linkin Park (headliner), Bad Religion, Avenged Sevenfold, Rise Against, Serj Tankian, Angels & Airwaves, Paramore Night 2 (Sunday): Muse (headliner), Jimmy Eat World, Modest Mouse, the Killers (surprise appearance), the Shins, Silversun Pickups, Feist, Spoon |
| December 13–14, 2008 | Night 1 (Saturday): The Offspring (headliner), Stone Temple Pilots, Rise Against, AFI, Staind, Three Days Grace, Slightly Stoopid, Hollywood Undead Night 2 (Sunday): The Cure (headliner), the Killers, Death Cab for Cutie, Paramore, Kanye West (Surprise Appearance), Franz Ferdinand, Scott Weiland, Snow Patrol, Vampire Weekend |
| December 12–13, 2009 | Night 1 (Saturday): AFI (headliner), Rise Against, Alice In Chains, Sublime with Rome (Surprise Appearance), Thirty Seconds to Mars, Three Days Grace, Dead By Sunrise, Anberlin Night 2 (Sunday): Muse (headliner), 311, the Bravery, Slightly Stoopid, Vampire Weekend, Phoenix, Cage the Elephant, Metric, White Rabbits |
| December 11–12, 2010 | Night 1 (Saturday): The Smashing Pumpkins (headliner), Social Distortion, My Chemical Romance, Jimmy Eat World, Bad Religion, Cake, the Dirty Heads, Anberlin, Switchfoot, A Day to Remember Night 2 (Sunday): Phoenix (headliner), Vampire Weekend, Brandon Flowers, the Black Keys, Florence and the Machine, Neon Trees, the Temper Trap, Broken Bells, Edward Sharpe & the Magnetic Zeros |
| December 10–11, 2011 | Night 1 (Saturday): Blink-182 (headliner), 311, Social Distortion, Sublime with Rome, Bush, Chevelle, Young the Giant, New Found Glory (Cancelled: Incubus) Night 2 (Sunday): Jane's Addiction (headliner), the Black Keys, Mumford & Sons, Death Cab for Cutie, Florence and the Machine, Noel Gallagher's High Flying Birds, Cage the Elephant, Foster the People, the Naked and Famous, Grouplove |
| December 8–9, 2012 | Night 1 (Saturday): Linkin Park (headliner), Rise Against, Bush, Garbage, Slightly Stoopid, Awolnation, the Lumineers, Walk the Moon, the Gaslight Anthem, Two Door Cinema Club, Youngblood Hawke Night 2 (Sunday): The Killers (headliner), Jack White, No Doubt (surprise appearance), fun., M83, Neon Trees, Passion Pit, Grouplove, Of Monsters and Men, Alex Clare, Imagine Dragons |
| December 7–8, 2013 | Night 1 (Saturday): Kings of Leon (headliner), Vampire Weekend, Queens of the Stone Age, AFI, Arctic Monkeys, Cage the Elephant, Grouplove, Foals, New Politics Night 2 (Sunday): Arcade Fire (headliner), Phoenix, Lorde, The Neighbourhood, Capital Cities, Fitz and the Tantrums, Portugal. The Man with special guest Curt Smith of Tears for Fears, Bastille, Atlas Genius |
| December 13–14, 2014 | Night 1 (Saturday): System of a Down (headliner), Linkin Park, Incubus, Fall Out Boy, Bush, Rise Against, Walk the Moon, New Politics, Royal Blood Night 2 (Sunday): No Doubt (headliner), The Smashing Pumpkins, Weezer, Tears for Fears, Imagine Dragons, Modest Mouse, Interpol, Alt-J, Vance Joy (Canceled: U2) |
| December 12–13, 2015 | Night 1 (Saturday): Disclosure (DJ set), Weezer, Twenty One Pilots, Cage the Elephant, Bastille, Silversun Pickups, Awolnation, X Ambassadors, Foals, Halsey, The Struts Night 2 (Sunday): Fall Out Boy (headliner), Of Monsters and Men, Chris Cornell, Cold War Kids, Panic! at the Disco, The Neighbourhood, The 1975, George Ezra, Elle King, James Bay, Andrew McMahon in the Wilderness |
| December 10–11, 2016 | Night 1 (Saturday): blink-182 (headliner), Kings of Leon, Jimmy Eat World, AFI, M83, X Ambassadors, The Strumbellas Night 2 (Sunday): Green Day (headliner), Beck, Weezer, Bastille, Andrew McMahon in the Wilderness, Phantogram, Bishop Briggs, The Head and the Heart |
| December 9–10, 2017 | Night 1 (Saturday): Muse (headliner), Thirty Seconds to Mars, Queens of the Stone Age, Rise Against, Prophets of Rage, Run The Jewels, Cold War Kids, Judah and the Lion, Royal Blood Night 2 (Sunday): The Killers (headliner), Weezer, The Lumineers, Foster the People, Phoenix, Walk the Moon, Franz Ferdinand, X Ambassadors, Vance Joy (Cancelled: Morrissey) |
| December 8–9, 2018 | Night 1 (Saturday): The Smashing Pumpkins, Thirty Seconds to Mars, Third Eye Blind, Greta Van Fleet, Bad Religion, The Interrupters, AFI, AJR, Badflower Night 2 (Sunday): Florence + The Machine, Death Cab for Cutie, Bastille, Mike Shinoda, Billie Eilish, Young the Giant, Chvrches, Mike Posner, Lovelytheband |
| December 7–9, 2019 | Night 1 (Saturday): Cage the Elephant, Beck, Jimmy Eat World, Young the Giant, Angels & Airwaves, Cold War Kids, The Head and the Heart, Catfish and the Bottlemen Night 2 (Sunday): Twenty One Pilots, Mumford & Sons, The 1975, The Raconteurs, Of Monsters and Men, The Interrupters, Lovelytheband, Matt Maeson |
| December 10, 2022 | Imagine Dragons, The Black Keys, Social Distortion (replaced Yeah Yeah Yeahs), Death Cab For Cutie, Jimmy Eat World, Yungblud, Måneskin, The Interrupters, Wet Leg |
| December 9, 2023 | The Offspring, 311, Garbage, Portugal. The Man, Bleachers, Cannons, Lovejoy, Bakar, The Beaches (Red Hot Chili Peppers were slated to headline; however, on December 5, 2023, it was announced that one of the band members (John Frusciante) was injured and unable to perform for six weeks, and the Red Hot Chili Peppers were replaced by 311. The Red Hot Chili Peppers played a makeup show on March 2, 2024 at the Kia Forum dubbed ‘KROQ’s March Two Re-Do’ with openers Alexsucks and Irontom.) |
| December 14, 2024 | The Smashing Pumpkins, Beck, 311, Sublime, Jimmy Eat World, Franz Ferdinand, Awolnation, The Linda Lindas, bby |
| December 13, 2025 | Evanescence, Papa Roach, Rise Against, Social Distortion, The All-American Rejects, Third Eye Blind, Yellowcard, Wet Leg, The Paradox |
