= Little Noise Sessions =

Series of acoustic concerts

The Little Noise Sessions was a series of acoustic charity concerts held annually at the Union Chapel, and at St. John at Hackney from 2011 in November, although one was held in Exeter in December 2009. The proceeds of ticket sales were donated to the charity, Mencap. The concerts were hosted by Jo Whiley.

The line-up varies for each night (headline act in bold).

== 2006 ==
- 19 November 2006 - **KT Tunstall**
- 20 November 2006 - **The Kooks** / Plan B / Get Cape. Wear Cape. Fly
- 21 November 2006 - **Paolo Nutini** / M Craft
- 22 November 2006 - **Guillemots** / Mystery Jets / Jamie T
- 23 November 2006 - **The Fratellis** / The View / Mohair
- 24 November 2006 - **Amy Winehouse** / Bat for Lashes / Mika
- 25 November 2006 - **Noel Gallagher**
- 26 November 2006 - **James Morrison** / The Automatic / Newton Faulkner / Lily Allen

== 2007 ==
- 20 November 2007 - **Jack Penate** / Laura Marling / The Young Knives / Joe Lean and the Jing Jang Jong
- 21 November 2007 - **Athlete** / The Hoosiers / Palladium / Cass Lowe
- 22 November 2007 - **Will Young** / David Jordan / Adele / Newton Faulkner
- 23 November 2007 - **Biffy Clyro** / We Are Scientists / The Courteeners / U2*
- 24 November 2007 - **The Kooks** / The Pigeon Detectives / The Metros / One Night Only
- 25 November 2007 - **Snow Patrol** / Declan O'Rourke / Róisín Murphy / Cajun Dance Party
- 26 November 2007 - **Kate Nash** / Robyn / The Ting Tings / Special Guest Billy Bragg
- 27 November 2007 - **The Enemy** / The Wombats / Noah and the Whale
- 28 November 2007 - **Keane** / Rilo Kiley / Duffy
- U2 were unannounced surprise guests. Bono & The Edge played "Stay", "Desire", "Angel of Harlem" and "Wave of Sorrow".

== 2008 ==
- 8 November 2008 - **Glasvegas** / White Lies and Cage the Elephant with surprise guests **The Killers**
- 9 November 2008 - **Razorlight**, Florence and the Machine, Esser and Skint & Demoralised
- 10 November 2008 - **Stereophonics** / Seasick Steve / Duke Special and General Fiasco
- 11 November 2008 - **Adele** and **Damien Rice** and Angus and Julia Stone
- 12 November 2008 - **Biffy Clyro** / Friendly Fires and Frank Turner
- 13 November 2008 - **James Morrison** / Katy Perry / Sam Beeton and Dan Black
- 14 November 2008 - **Kasabian** / Reverend and the Makers and The Hours with guest compere **The Edge**
- 15 November 2008 - **Keane** / The Script / Bryn Christopher / Red Light Company and Absent Elk
- 18 November 2008 - **The Fratellis** / Noah and the Whale / Ladyhawke and Sergeant

== 2009 ==
- 16 November 2009 - **Editors** / The Maccabees / Bombay Bicycle Club / Everything Everything (band)
- 17 November 2009 - **Alexandra Burke** / Alphabeat / Marina and the Diamonds / VV Brown
- 18 November 2009 - **Mika** / Paloma Faith / Alex Gardner / Daisy Dares You
- 19 November 2009 - **Richard Hawley** / Corinne Bailey Rae / I Blame Coco / Alex Turner
- 20 November 2009 - **Lostprophets** / The Blackout / The King Blues / Egyptian Hip Hop
- 21 November 2009 - **Taio Cruz** / Tinchy Stryder / Chipmunk (Cancelled)
- 22 November 2009 - **Florence and the Machine** / Golden Silvers / Erik Hassle / Ellie Goulding
- 23 November 2009 - **David Gray** / The Low Anthem / Lisa Mitchell
- 24 November 2009 - **Newton Faulkner** / Scouting for Girls / Little Comets / Stornoway
- 19 December 2009, in Exeter - **Coldplay** / Lily Allen (pulled out due to illness) / La Roux / six members of Tiverton Town Band.

== 2010 ==
- 15 November 2010 - **Ting Tings** / Tom Jones / Lauren Pritchard
- 16 November 2010 - **Jessie J** / Paolo Nutini / Rumer / Daisy Dares You
- 17 November 2010 - **Hurts** / Claire Maguire / Saint Saviour
- 18 November 2010 - **Example** / We Are Scientists
- 20 November 2010 - Ellie Goulding / Lissie / Benjamin Francis Leftwich

== 2011 ==
- 22 November 2011 - **Elbow** / Maverick Sabre
- 23 November 2011 - Marina and the Diamonds / Icona Pop / Spark
- 25 November 2011 - Goldfrapp / Alpines
- 26 November 2011 - **Example** / Ed Sheeran / Birdy
- 27 November 2011 - Sinéad O'Connor / King Creosote

== 2012 ==
- 19 November 2012 - Gary Barlow and guests
- 20 November 2012 - **Olly Murs** / Loveable Rogues / Lawson
- 21 November 2012 - Richard Hawley with First Aid Kit and King Charles
- 23 November 2012 - **Maccabees** / Jessie Ware / Jamie N Commons
- 24 November 2012 - **Noah & The Whale** / Lucy Rose / Villagers / Tom Odell
- 25 November 2012 - **Amy Macdonald** / Newton Faulkner / Karin Park

== 2014 ==
- 22 October 2014 - **Jake Bugg** / Syd Arthur
- 23 October 2014 - **David Gray** / Rhodes
