= Crossing Border Festival =

Annual pop music and literature festival in The Hague, Netherlands

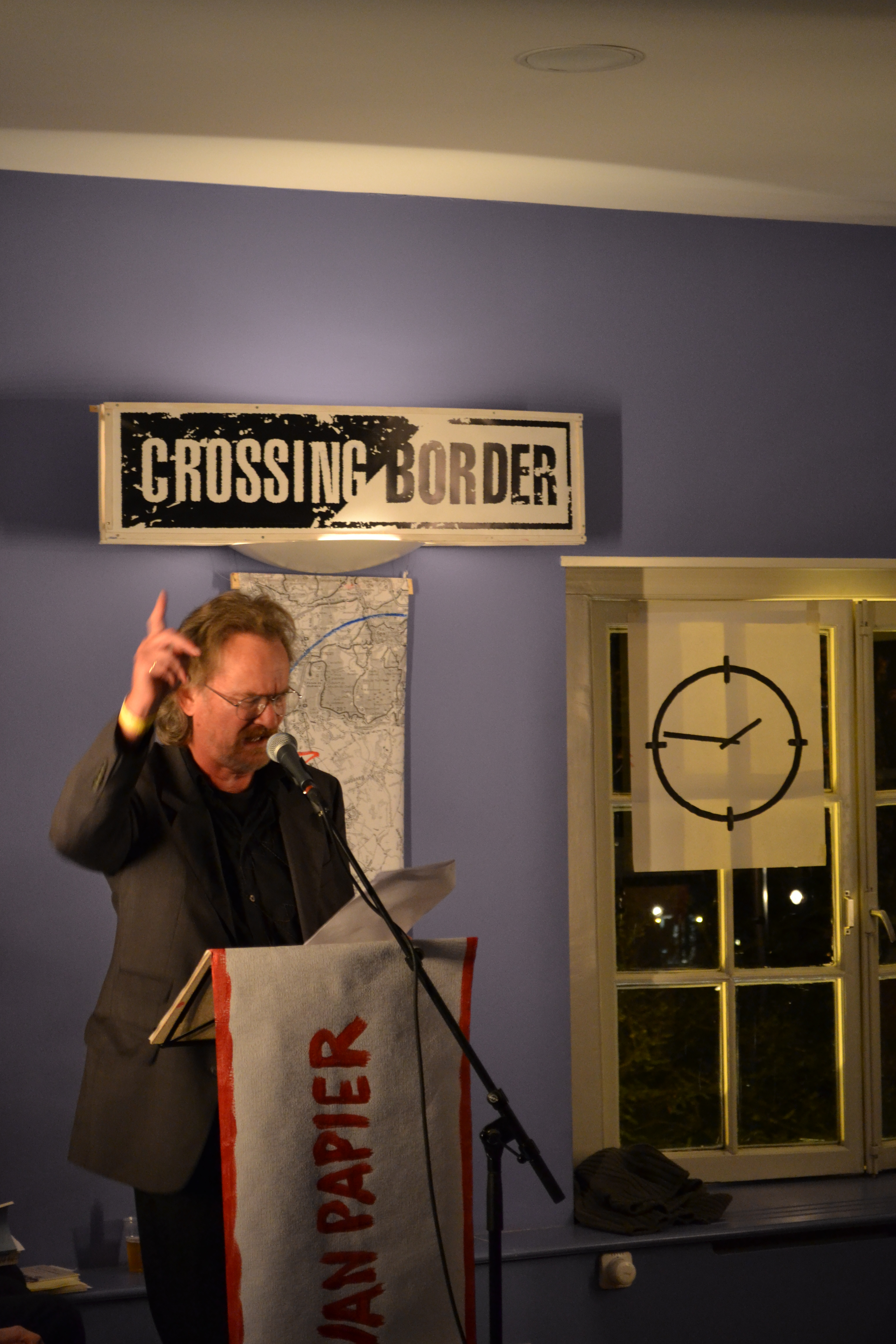
Jan J.B. Kuipers as a member of the Men of Paper during Crossing Border Festival, The Hague, 2011.

Crossing Border Festival is an annual festival in The Hague, Netherlands focusing on new pop music acts and literature. It is one of the largest combined music and literature festivals in Europe. The first edition took place in 1993, as a larger follow-on to the Zuiderstrand Festival held in 1991 and 1992. The festival originated in The Hague; was shifted to Amsterdam, but afterwards shifted back to The Hague. The city government is involved with the fest as part of their support of the arts.

== Border Sessions ==
Starting in 2013, the festival added an affiliated international technology festival, "Border Sessions," bringing in speakers, interviewing technologists and science fiction writers, and setting up meet-up events and workshops.
