= Terris (band) =

- Origin: Newport, Wales
- Genres: Alternative rock, post-Britpop, neo-psychedelia
- Years active: 1998–2002
- Labels: Rough Trade; Blanco y Negro
- Past members: Gavin Goodwin; Alun Bound; Neil Dugmore; Owen Matthews

Terris were a Welsh indie band who had a minor UK hit single in 2001 with "Fabricated Lunacy".

== History ==
Founded in Newport in 1996, they were fronted by Gavin Goodwin, supported by Alun Bound on guitar, Neil Dugmore on bass keyboards, and Owen Matthews on drums.

The band released The Time Is Now, their first EP, in 1999 on Rough Trade. This gained them prominent support from the New Musical Express magazine, which hailed them as a "21st Century Joy Division" and "the best new band in the UK", and featured them on its front cover in January 2000. Also that year, the group co-headlined a tour with Coldplay, at some particularly small venues including the Tunbridge Wells Forum the week of Coldplay's first Top 40 success, and won the "brightest hope" at the 2000 NME Brats.

Journalist Ted Kessler wrote of the band, "Only one band want to make records that blow holes through the limits of what we currently meekly accept as sonically reasonable in the field of rock. Only one band can. And that’s Terris."

They subsequently signed to the Blanco y Negro label, releasing two further singles, the second of which, "Fabricated Lunacy", reached number 62 on the UK Singles Chart. Debut album Learning to Let Go was released in March 2001. Critical reaction was mixed, with Allmusic commenting on "Goodwin's grating, tune-seeking vocal grunts" and the band's "leg-splayed, Bush-styled grunge-metal hooks and glaringly obvious lyrical themes". NME's April Long was more positive, giving it an 8 out of 10 rating and calling it "a vociferous statement of intent from a band dedicated to annihilating clichés". Disappointing sales led to them being dropped in December of that year. The band split up shortly afterwards.

== Discography ==
=== Albums ===
- Learning to Let Go (2001), Blanco y Negro – UK #82

=== Singles, EPs ===
- The Time is Now EP (1999), Rough Trade
- "Cannibal Kids" (2000), Blanco y Negro – UK #80
- "Fabricated Lunacy" (2001), Blanco y Negro – UK #62
