= Bellatrix (band) =

Icelandic rock group

Bellatrix were an Icelandic rock group. The group was founded in 1992 in Keflavík as Kolrassa krókríðandi (Black-ass Hookrider) by four women, all aged sixteen: Elíza M Geirsdóttir (vocals and violin), Sigrún Eiríksdóttir (guitar), Ester Bíbí Ásgeirsdóttir (bass) and Birgitta Vilbersdóttir (drums).

== History ==
The band released the mini-album Drápa (named after the form of skaldic poetry) in 1992. In 1994, they released Kynjasögur ("Family Stories") with Anna Margrét Hraundal (guitar) and Karl Ágúst Guðmundsson (trumpet and keyboard) replacing Birgitta. Two years later, in 1996, they released Köld eru kvennaráð ("Cold are the counsels of women," likely referencing a famous line from Njáls saga).

They also released Stranger Tales in 1995, which featured some English versions of Icelandic songs. This was also their first CD published under the name Bellatrix. This was followed by G in 1998 released on Global Warming Records. In 1999, they moved to London and signed to Fierce Panda. They headlined a mini UK tour in the autumn of 1999, with Coldplay joining them as co-headliner. The following year, they released It's All True with Fierce Panda. Their single, "Jedi Wannabe", peaked at #65 in the UK Singles Chart in September 2000. They broke up the following year, with most of the band returning to Iceland except Elíza, who remained in London to continue studying music.

== Discography ==
- Drápa EP - 1992
- Kynjasögur - 1994
- Stranger Tales - 1995 (U.S. Release)
- Köld Eru Kvennaráð - 1996
- G - 1998 (U.K. Release)
- It's All True - 2000
