= Deck the Hall Ball =

Musical Event

Deck The Hall Ball
- Genre: Alternative rock
- Dates: mid-December
- Location: Seattle
- Years active: 1992 – 2019
- Founders: 107.7 The End KNDD-FM

Deck The Hall Ball is an annual holiday-themed concert run by Seattle radio station 107.7 The End KNDD-FM. It takes place in mid-December and has been held in a number of different venues in the Seattle area.

== Notes ==
In 2001, KNDD split Deck into two nights, the first of which was an all-electric "Plugged In" show, with the following night's bands playing unplugged acoustic sets.

In past years KNDD has streamed the entire concert live on its website 1077TheEnd.com.

== Line-ups ==
Date	Venue	Lineup
December 1992	Seattle Art Museum Steps	Evan Dando, Sarah McLachlan
December 9, 1993	Paramount Theatre	Urge Overkill, Cracker, Teenage Fanclub, Evan Dando, The Posies, Cowboy Junkies, The Wonder Stuff, Catherine Wheel, Redd Kross
December 17, 1994	Seattle Convention Center	Sheryl Crow, The Cramps, Jesus and Mary Chain, Radiohead, Butt Trumpet, Fretblanket
December 2, 1995	Mercer Arena	Porno for Pyros, Sonic Youth, Oasis, Everclear, Jawbreaker, The Rentals, Tripping Daisy
December 7, 1996	Mercer Arena	The Presidents of the United States of America, Orbital, Silverchair, Luscious Jackson (filled in for Butthole Surfers), Stabbing Westward, Fun Lovin' Criminals, Eels, Super Deluxe
December 10, 1997	Mercer Arena	Green Apple Quick Step, Everclear, Sneaker Pimps, The Cure
December 10, 1998	KeyArena	Garbage, Cake, Soul Coughing, Ken Stringfellow, Mark Lanegan, Elliott Smith, Hole, Cherry Poppin' Daddies, Marcy Playground
December 9, 1999	KeyArena	Bush, Beck, Foo Fighters, Run-DMC, 311, Filter, Staind
December 14, 2000	KeyArena	Green Day, Moby, Papa Roach, Orgy, Fuel, Eve 6
December 7, 2001	Paramount Theatre	Staind, Linkin Park, Blink 182, System of a Down
December 8, 2001	Paramount Theatre	Staind, Coldplay, Travis
December 12, 2002	KeyArena	Disturbed, Sum 41, 3 Doors Down, Good Charlotte, Sparta
December 11, 2003	Moore Theatre	Linkin Park, AFI, Rancid, Chevelle, Iggy Pop
December 9, 2004	KeyArena	Modest Mouse, Franz Ferdinand, The Killers, The Shins, Keane, Snow Patrol
December 8, 2005	Showbox at the Market	Death Cab for Cutie, Harvey Danger, Aqueduct, The Saturday Knights
December 7, 2006	KeyArena	Gnarls Barkley, My Chemical Romance, Angels and Airwaves, Jet, Snow Patrol, Taking Back Sunday, Pete Yorn, The Shins
December 6, 2007	Comcast Arena	Modest Mouse, Jimmy Eat World, She Wants Revenge, Coheed & Cambria, Spoon, The Kooks
December 9, 2008	WaMu Theater	The Killers, Death Cab for Cutie, Cold War Kids, Shiny Toy Guns, Aqueduct
December 15, 2009	WaMu Theater	Muse, Thirty Seconds to Mars, Vampire Weekend, Metric, Phoenix, Visqueen
December 8, 2010	WaMu Theater	Broken Bells, The Black Keys, Jimmy Eat World, Cake, The Temper Trap, Sleigh Bells
December 7, 2011	KeyArena	Death Cab for Cutie, Mumford & Sons, Foster the People, Cage The Elephant, Two Door Cinema Club, Young the Giant, Grouplove
December 4, 2012	KeyArena	The Killers, M83, Metric, The Lumineers, Passion Pit, Awolnation, Grouplove, Of Monsters and Men, The Joy Formidable
December 3, 2013	KeyArena	Vampire Weekend, Phoenix, The Head and the Heart, Alt-J, Arctic Monkeys, Lorde, Foals, Chvrches
December 9, 2014	KeyArena	Imagine Dragons, Weezer, Cage The Elephant, Young The Giant, TV On The Radio, KONGOS, Vance Joy, Royal Blood
December 8, 2015	KeyArena	Death Cab For Cutie, Cage The Elephant, Twenty One Pilots, Walk the Moon, Alabama Shakes, Nathaniel Rateliff & The Night Sweats, X Ambassadors, Deep Sea Diver
December 6, 2016	KeyArena	Empire of the Sun, The Head and the Heart, Jimmy Eat World, Phantogram, Glass Animals, Band of Horses, COIN, My Goodness
December 4, 2017	KeyArena	The Killers, The Lumineers, ODESZA, Portugal. The Man, Joywave, J Roddy Walston and the Business, J GRGRY
December 11, 2018	WaMu Theater	Death Cab For Cutie, Bastille, Young the Giant, Billie Eilish, Jenn Champion
December 10, 2019	WaMu Theater	The 1975, The Head and the Heart, Catfish and the Bottlemen, The Regrettes
