= KROQ Weenie Roast =

Annual live music event in California, US

- Status: Inactive
- Genre: Alternative rock, heavy metal, punk rock, hip-hop, reggae, ska
- Frequency: Mid May or mid June annually
- Venue: Irvine Meadows/Verizon Wireless Amphitheatre (1993–1999, 2001–2016); Edison International Field (2000); StubHub Center (2017–2018); Doheny State Beach (2019)
- Locations: Irvine, California (1993–1999, 2001–2016); Anaheim, California (2000); Carson, California (2017–2018); Dana Point, California (2019)
- Country: United States
- Years active: 1993–2019
- Inaugurated: June 12, 1993
- Founders: KROQ-FM
- Most recent: June 8, 2019
- Website: KROQ 106.7 – Weenie Roast

KROQ Weenie Roast was a multi-artist music concert, presented annually in May by the Los Angeles, California modern rock radio station KROQ-FM. Since its beginning in 1993, it has been traditionally held on a Saturday in May or June, but due to the COVID-19 pandemic, there have been no editions of the festival since 2019.

== Overview ==
Every year, the KROQ Weenie Roast had taken place at Irvine Meadows/Verizon Wireless Amphitheatre, in Irvine, California with exception in 2000 when it was held at the Angel Stadium, then-known as the Edison International Field, in Anaheim, California. In 2016 Irvine Meadows Amphitheatre was demolished, and KROQ responded by announcing that the 2017 edition would take place at StubHub Center in Carson.

From 2006 to 2009, the event was re-branded as Weenie Roast y Fiesta with the distribution of complimentary sombreros for its festival attendees. In 2012 in conjunction with Cinco de Mayo it returned to the Weenie Roast y Fiesta name again.

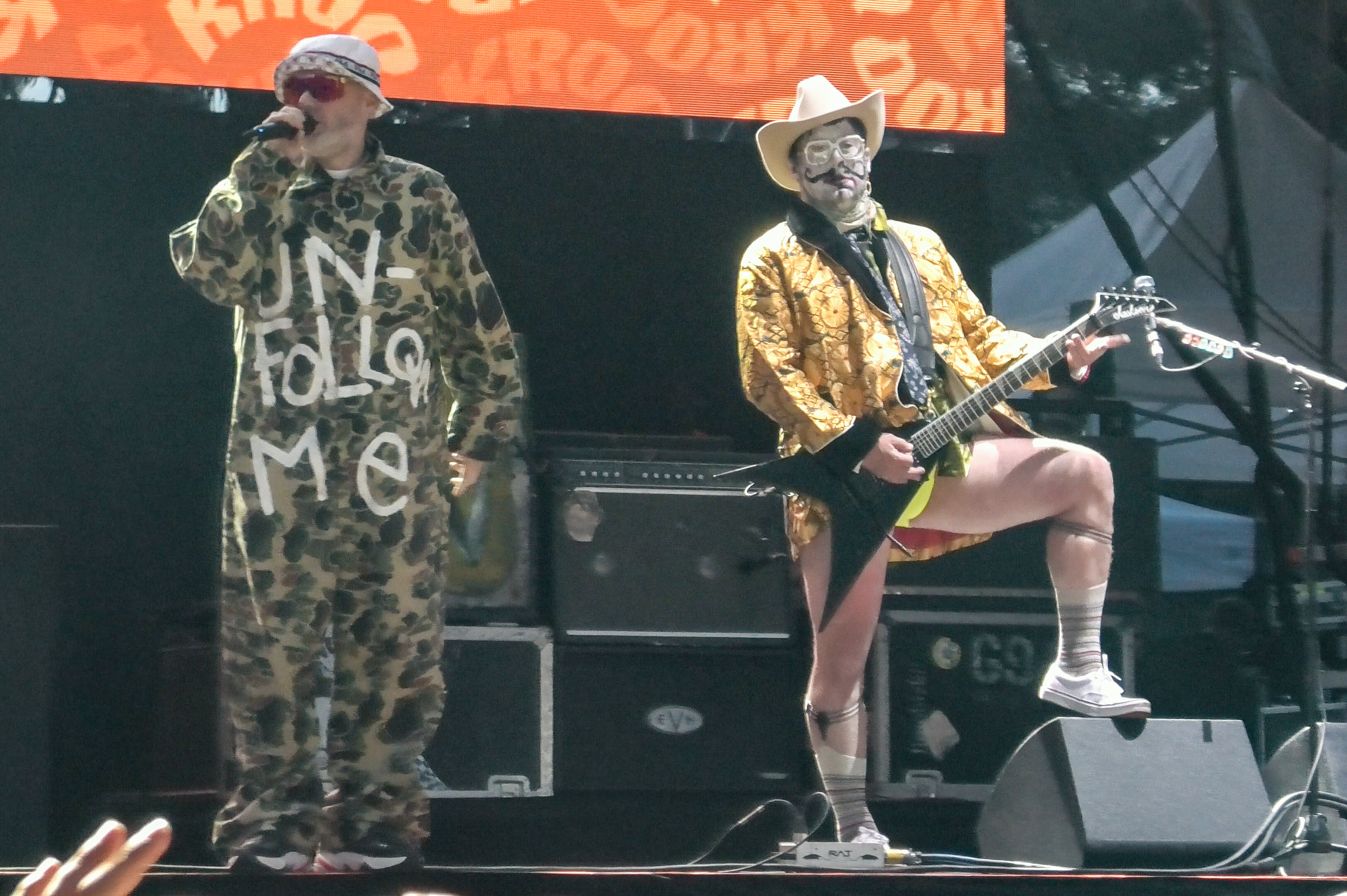
Fred Durst & Wes Borland performing at KROQ Weenie Roast 2019.

Its East Coast "sister" concert, presented by KROQ-FM's Baltimore/Washington, DC affiliate station WHFS, is the HFStival. Its northern California "sister" concert, presented by KROQ-FM's Bay Area affiliate station KITS, is the BFD festival.

With the Irvine Meadows Amphitheatre's land lease due to expire in 2017, KROQ-FM announced that the 2016 event would be the last to be held at the venue. The Red Hot Chili Peppers were forced to cancel their headlining slot at the 2016 Weenie Roast, as singer Anthony Kiedis was rushed to the hospital prior to the band appearing on stage, due to severe stomach pain. His bandmates made the official announcement on the stage as they were due to appear. Weezer replaced them as the headlining act.

Due to the COVID-19 pandemic, and after the lax restrictions of large gatherings and live music venues in late 2021 to mid 2022, there have been no editions of the festival since 2019.

== Lineups ==
Bands listed in reverse order of night's performance.

Date	Lineup
June 12, 1993	X, The The, Dramarama, Terence Trent D'Arby, Suede, Stone Temple Pilots, the Lemonheads, Gin Blossoms, the Posies, Bettie Serveert, Rocket from the Crypt
June 11, 1994	The Violent Femmes, Oingo Boingo, The Pretenders, Counting Crows, Green Day, Rollins Band, The Offspring, James, Beck, The Afghan Whigs, Pavement, Frente!, Candlebox
June 17, 1995	Ramones, Hole, White Zombie, Soul Asylum, Rancid, Rage Against the Machine, Bush, The Orb, Sponge, Elastica, Matthew Sweet, Throwing Muses, Better Than Ezra, Sublime, Chub
June 15, 1996	Kiss, Red Hot Chili Peppers, No Doubt, Korn, Everclear, Garbage, The Verve Pipe, Goldfinger, Lush, The Fugees, 311, Wack Pack
June 14, 1997	Main Stage: The Cure, The Offspring, The Chemical Brothers, Oasis, Foo Fighters, Blur, Social Distortion, The Wallflowers, Third Eye Blind, Radiohead, Echo & the Bunnymen, The Mighty Mighty Bosstones, Reel Big Fish, Don Ho, Squirrel Nut Zippers Side Stage: Descendents, That Dog, Agnes Gooch, Save Ferris, Ozomatli
June 20, 1998	Main Stage: The Prodigy, Green Day, Madness, Third Eye Blind, The Wallflowers, Everclear, Save Ferris, Blink-182, Creed, Cherry Poppin' Daddies, Marcy Playground, Fastball Side Stage: The Crystal Method, Big Bad Voodoo Daddy, Deftones, Ozomatli, Sprung Monkey, Harvey Danger
June 19, 1999	Main Stage: Red Hot Chili Peppers, Metallica, Limp Bizkit, Blink-182, Sugar Ray, Live, Kid Rock, Smash Mouth, Orgy, Pennywise Side Stage: Moby, Lo Fidelity Allstars, The Living End, Freestylers, Lit (Cancelled: Eve 6)
June 17, 2000	Korn, Ozzy Osbourne (w/ Black Sabbath), Limp Bizkit, The Offspring, Creed, Moby, Stone Temple Pilots, No Doubt, Third Eye Blind, Godsmack, Cypress Hill, Everclear, Lit, Incubus (Cancelled: Eminem)
June 23, 2001	Main Stage: Jane's Addiction, Blink-182, Stone Temple Pilots, Staind, 311 (w/ Shaquille O'Neal surprise appearance), Linkin Park, Papa Roach, Coldplay, The Cult, Disturbed, Crazy Town, Stabbing Westward Side Stage: Pennywise, New Found Glory, The Living End, Sum 41
June 15, 2002	Main Stage: System of a Down, P.O.D., Incubus, Moby, The Violent Femmes (surprise appearance), Rob Zombie, Puddle of Mudd, Papa Roach, Jimmy Eat World, The Strokes, Bad Religion, New Found Glory, Mix Master Mike Side Stage: Unwritten Law, Hoobastank, The Vines, Jack Johnson
June 14, 2003	Main Stage: Godsmack, Liam Lynch, Foo Fighters, Deftones, Jane's Addiction (surprise appearance), The White Stripes, Staind, Sum 41, AFI, The Transplants (w/ Pink and Rancid surprise appearances), Blur, The Used, Joel and Benji Madden from Good Charlotte (acoustic), Less Than Jake Side Stage A: Chevelle, Hot Hot Heat, Interpol, Thrice Side Stage B: Pete Yorn, Finch, The Ataris (Cancelled: Evanescence)
June 12, 2004	Main Stage: The Strokes, Beastie Boys, Bad Religion, Velvet Revolver, The Hives, Cypress Hill, Modest Mouse, Yeah Yeah Yeahs, The Killers Side Stage: Hoobastank, New Found Glory, Yellowcard, Story of the Year
May 21, 2005	Main Stage: Mötley Crüe, Foo Fighters, Audioslave, The Killers, Queens of the Stone Age, Interpol, Jimmy Eat World, My Chemical Romance, Hot Hot Heat, MxPx Side Stage: The Mars Volta, Bloc Party, The Transplants, Alkaline Trio, The Bravery, The Dead 60s, Open Air Stereo
May 13, 2006	Main Stage: Red Hot Chili Peppers, Matisyahu, Dave Grohl (surprise appearance), AFI, Angels & Airwaves, Rob Zombie, Dashboard Confessional, She Wants Revenge, Panic! at the Disco, Taking Back Sunday, Damian "Jr. Gong" Marley, HIM Side Stage: Atreyu, Wolfmother, The Academy Is..., Matchbook Romance, Rock Kills Kid
May 19, 2007	Main Stage: Linkin Park, Korn, Social Distortion, Incubus (special appearance), Interpol, Queens of the Stone Age, Bad Religion, Thirty Seconds to Mars, Rise Against, The Bravery, Tiger Army Side Stage: Tim Armstrong, Peter Bjorn and John, Silversun Pickups, Plain White T's (Cancelled: The Killers)
May 17, 2008	Main Stage: Metallica, The Offspring, The Raconteurs, Rise Against, Bad Religion, Pennywise, Scars on Broadway, Seether, Flogging Molly, Atreyu Side Stage (Bud Light Stage Dos): The Bravery, MGMT, Flobots, Ludo
May 16, 2009	Main Stage: Travis Barker + DJ AM (special guests) (w/ Warren G (surprise appearance)), Rancid, Kings of Leon, Jimmy Eat World, Yeah Yeah Yeahs, Weezer, Silversun Pickups, The Airborne Toxic Event, Cage The Elephant, White Lies, Hollywood Undead, Asher Roth, Anberlin, Big B (Cancelled: Blink-182 (surprise appearance))
June 5, 2010	Main Stage: Sublime with Rome, Stone Temple Pilots, Hole, Devo, Paramore, Silversun Pickups, Spoon, Cage the Elephant, The Dirty Heads Side Stage (Bud Light): Deftones, Chevelle, Against Me!, Passion Pit, The Temper Trap
June 4, 2011	Main Stage: Linkin Park, Foo Fighters (surprise appearance), Rise Against, The Strokes, Bad Religion, Cage the Elephant, A Day to Remember, Face to Face Side Stage (Bud Light): Neon Trees, The Airborne Toxic Event, Foster the People, Young the Giant (Cancelled: Lykke Li)
May 5, 2012	Main Stage: Coldplay, Incubus, The Offspring, Soundgarden (surprise appearance), Silversun Pickups, Pennywise, Angels & Airwaves, The Dirty Heads, Garbage Side Stage (Bud Light): Awolnation, Grouplove, Of Monsters and Men, Walk the Moon
May 18, 2013	Main Stage: The Black Keys, Thirty Seconds to Mars, Stone Temple Pilots (surprise appearance; debut with Chester Bennington as lead vocalist), Vampire Weekend, Of Monsters and Men, Jimmy Eat World, Silversun Pickups, Imagine Dragons, Awolnation, Atlas Genius Side Stage (Bud Light): Fitz and the Tantrums, The Neighbourhood, Capital Cities, New Politics, Twenty One Pilots KROQ Festival Broadcast Stage: C2C, DJ Jeremiah Red
May 31, 2014	Main Stage: Avicii, Beck, Foster the People, Fall Out Boy, The Neighbourhood, Bastille, Fitz and the Tantrums, Capital Cities, DJ Jeremiah Red Side Stage (Bud Light): Phantogram, The 1975, American Authors, Kongos, Bleachers, Cherub
May 16, 2015	Main Stage: Muse, Of Monsters And Men, Florence And The Machine, Death Cab For Cutie, Panic! at the Disco, Walk the Moon, AWOLNATION, Vance Joy, Cold War Kids, DJ Jeremiah Red Side Stage (Bud Light): All Time Low, Big Data, Saint Motel, James Bay, X Ambassadors
May 14, 2016	Main Stage: Weezer, Empire of the Sun, Blink-182 (surprise appearance), Panic! at the Disco, The Lumineers, Garbage, Cold War Kids, Fitz and the Tantrums, Miike Snow Side Stage (Bud Light): Lukas Graham, The Strumbellas, Nothing But Thieves, Bishop Briggs, Bear Hands (Cancelled: Red Hot Chili Peppers (Cancelled 30 minutes before they were supposed to go on stage))
May 20, 2017	Main Stage: Lorde, Incubus, Imagine Dragons, Cage the Elephant, 311, Paramore, Lana Del Rey, Dreamcar, Andrew McMahon in the Wilderness Side Stage (Bud Light): Judah & the Lion, New Politics, The Revivalists
May 12, 2018	Main Stage: Blink-182, Panic! at the Disco, Thirty Seconds to Mars, Rise Against, Dirty Heads, Cold War Kids, The War on Drugs, AWOLNATION, Bishop Briggs, Manchester Orchestra Side Stage (Bud Light): Mike Shinoda, James Bay, Alice Merton, Nothing But Thieves, Mt. Joy
June 8, 2019	311, Limp Bizkit, The Lumineers, Silversun Pickups, DJ Snoopadelic, The Revivalists, Catfish and the Bottlemen, X Ambassadors, Flora Cash, Smith & Thell, The Regrettes

== See also ==
- KROQ Top 106.7 Countdowns
