= A Rush of Blood to the Head Tour =

2002–2003 concert tour by Coldplay

- Tour by Coldplay
- Promotional poster
- Location: Asia; Europe; North America; South America; Oceania
- Associated album: A Rush of Blood to the Head
- Start date: 19 June 2002
- End date: 8 September 2003
- No. of shows: 151
- Attendance: 854,424
- Box office: $27.1 million (Note: $47.43 million in 2025 dollars.)
- Website: coldplay.com

Coldplay concert chronology
- Parachutes Tour (2000–2001); A Rush of Blood to the Head Tour (2002–2003); Twisted Logic Tour (2005–2007)

A Rush of Blood to the Head Tour was the second concert tour undertaken by British rock band Coldplay. It was launched in support of their second studio album A Rush of Blood to the Head. They performed a total of 151 shows across Europe, Asia, Oceania and the Americas. Between 21 and 23 July 2003, the band filmed Live 2003 at the Hordern Pavilion, Sydney.

== Background ==
Overall, Coldplay's concerts during this period showcased its progression as a bona fide live act. The band began playing more shows in arenas and amphitheatres, moving away from the club venues that dominated earlier tours. Shows also had more elaborate stage and lighting effects. For example, strobe lighting for the song "Daylight" featured the image of a rotating sun superimposed over the stage. Taking a cue from U2's Elevation Tour and Nine Inch Nails' Fragility Tour, Coldplay also adopted a series of back screens that displayed video footage of each band member simultaneously.

Other highlights included:

- Lead singer Chris Martin sang with Ron Sexsmith on the track, "Gold in Them Hills" during the headline set.
- An ambient, instrumental introduction before the start of "Politik" for every show. This can particularly be heard on the Live 2003 DVD. Note: Not the same as the Brian Eno introduction sometimes used before this intro.
- Guitarist Jonny Buckland regularly played a harmonica solo on the track "Don't Panic". He tossed the harmonica into the crowd after the solo's completion. Buckland also performed an original electric guitar introduction for the track.
- The aforementioned back screens were unfurled mid-concert, usually during the beginning of "One I Love".
- At some shows, Martin sang lyrics after inhaling from a helium balloon.
- Martin usually wore a Make Trade Fair T-shirt during 2002 shows to promote the Oxfam campaign. Make Trade Fair booths were present at venues, where concert-goers could sign petitions and learn about the campaign's objectives.
- An specially created, ambient introduction for "Yellow", featuring a dark and gloomy tone. Martin sings the lyrics, "Your skin... Oh-oh-oh..." during the introduction, which afterwards leads to the regular start of the song.

== Opening acts ==
Most of the tour included at least one supporting act on each concert, with English singer Richard Hawley opening all performances held between 19 and 28 June 2002. Except for the show at Rome's Valle Giulia (which had the Music), all dates from 30 June to 12 July included 1 Giant Leap. For the second North American leg, Coldplay invited Northern Irish band Ash, while the third European run featured Idlewild. In 2003, Ron Sexsmith opened for the band from 21 January to 9 February. He was succeeded by the Music starting from 24 February. As Coldplay returned to Europe for a fourth leg, Feeder was chosen as their support and Ian McCulloch additionally guested in the United Kingdom. The last North American run counted with Eisley, who were joined by Damien Rice on 25 May, and Sexsmith between 27 May and 13 June. During the tour's final months, Coldplay went to Asia, Oceania and Latin America: the first two continents had Betchadupa, while Mexico featured Jumbo.

== Concert synopsis ==
The tour's concerts were noted for its use of strobe lighting.

The 2002 shows contained a rough 50/50 split in material from Parachutes and A Rush of Blood to the Head. The official tour in 2003 focused on songs from the second album, as well as many unreleased tracks. For example, the future Live 2003 song "Moses" and "Fix You" B-side "Pour Me" were introduced during the tour. Other new songs included future X&Y b-sides, "Gravity" & "Proof", "Your World Turns Upside Down", which would later become a completely different song called "The World Turned Upside Down" as another b-side to "Fix You", and an unreleased piano ballad called "A Ladder to the Sun".

Coldplay also made a habit of covering other artists on the tour, often as outros to their own songs. Covers ranged from a tongue-in-cheek excerpt of Avril Lavigne's "Sk8er Boi" to the Louis Armstrong classic "What a Wonderful World". Coldplay also regularly covered Echo & the Bunnymen's "Lips Like Sugar" in its entirety, in homage to Ian McCulloch's role as a mentor during the recording of A Rush of Blood to the Head.

The musical introduction to the concert featured selections from Brian Eno's Apollo: Atmospheres and Soundtracks.

== Reception ==
In total, the tour grossed $27,152,888 from 854,424 tickets sold. Pollstar also reported that Coldplay sold 341,201 admissions in 2003, which placed them at number 42 on the list of most attended tours of the year. Rolling Stone Australia ranked the shows at Sydney's Hordern Pavilion among the best in the venue's history in 2024.

== Set list ==
This set list was taken from the 22 July 2003 concert in Sydney, Australia. It does not represent all shows throughout the tour.

1. "Politik"
2. "God Put a Smile upon Your Face"
3. "A Rush of Blood to the Head"
4. "Daylight"
5. "Trouble"
6. "One I Love"
7. "Don't Panic"
8. "Shiver"
9. "See You Soon"
10. "Everything's Not Lost"
11. "Moses"
12. "Yellow"
13. "The Scientist"
14. "What a Wonderful World" (Louis Armstrong cover)

Encore

15. "Clocks"
16. "In My Place"
17. "Amsterdam"
18. "Life Is for Living"

== Tour dates ==
List of 2002 concerts
Date (2002)	City	Country	Venue
19 June	Edinburgh	Scotland	Queen's Hall
20 June	Liverpool	England	Mountfield Hall
22 June (Note: The concert in London on 22 June 2002 was part of the Meltdown festival.)	London	England	Royal Festival Hall
24 June	Bath	England	Bath Pavilion
26 June	Truro	England	Hall for Cornwall
28 June (Note: The concert in Pilton on 28 June 2002 was part of the Glastonbury Festival.)	Pilton	England	Worthy Farm
30 June (Note: The concert in Werchter on 30 June 2002 was part of the Rock Werchter festival.)	Werchter	Belgium	Festivalpark Werchter
2 July	Stockholm	Sweden	Göta Källare
3 July (Note: The concert in Ringe on 3 July 2002 was part of the Midtfyns Festival.)	Ringe	Denmark	Ringe Dyrskuepladsen
5 July	Amsterdam	Netherlands	Heineken Music Hall
7 July	Rome	Italy	Valle Giulia
9 July	Hamburg	Germany	Große Freiheit 36
10 July (Note: The concert in Cologne on 10 July 2002 was part of 1Live Radiokonzert.)	Cologne	Germany	Kultkomplex Cafe
12 July	Oslo	Norway	Rockefeller Music Hall
2 August (Note: The concert in Chicago on 2 August 2002 was part of the $2 Bill Show.)	Chicago	United States	The Vic Theatre
6 August	Boston	United States	Paradise Rock Club
7 August	Philadelphia	United States	Theatre of Living Arts
10 August	Washington, D.C.	United States	9:30 Club
12 August	New York City	United States	Bowery Ballroom
14 August	Minneapolis	United States	First Avenue
16 August (Note: The concert in Boulder on 16 August 2002 was part of the R&R Triple A Summit.)	Boulder	United States	Fox Theatre
18 August	San Francisco	United States	Bimbo's 365 Club
20 August	Los Angeles	United States	El Rey Theatre
27 August (Note: The concert in Paris on 27 August 2002 was broadcast on television by MCM.)	Paris	France	L'Olympia
29 August	London	England	London Forum
4 September	Seattle	United States	Paramount Theatre
6 September	Berkeley (Note: Labelled as San Francisco in promotional material.)	United States	Hearst Greek Theatre
7 September	Paradise (Note: Labelled as Las Vegas in promotional material.)	United States	The Joint
9 September	San Diego	United States	SDSU Open Air Theatre
10 September	Los Angeles	United States	Greek Theatre
16 September	Baltimore	United States	Pier Six Pavilion
17 September	Boston	United States	FleetBoston Pavilion
19 September	Wantagh (Note: Labelled as New York City in promotional material.)	United States	Tommy Hilfiger at Jones Beach Theater
21 September	Toronto	Canada	Air Canada Centre
24 September	Chicago	United States	UIC Pavilion
4 October	Glasgow	Scotland	SEC Centre
5 October	Newcastle	England	Telewest Arena
7 October	Birmingham	England	National Indoor Arena
8 October	Nottingham	England	Nottingham Arena
11 October	Manchester	England	Manchester Evening News Arena
14 October	Brighton	England	Brighton Centre
15 October	Bournemouth	England	Bournemouth International Centre
17 October	Plymouth	England	Plymouth Pavilions
18 October	Port Talbot	Wales	Afan Lido Leisure Centre
20 October	London	England	Wembley Arena
21 October	London	England	Wembley Arena
23 October	Belfast	Northern Ireland	Odyssey Centre
25 October	Dublin	Ireland	Point Theatre
27 October	Dublin	Ireland	Point Theatre
3 November	Brussels	Belgium	Forest National
5 November	Rotterdam	Netherlands	Ahoy Rotterdam
6 November (Note: The concert in Paris on 6 November 2002 was part of the Les Inrockuptibles Festival.)	Paris	France	Zénith de Paris
8 November	Cologne	Germany	Palladium
10 November	Munich	Germany	Kulturhalle Zenith
12 November	Montpellier	France	Zénith de Montpellier
15 November	Madrid	Spain	La Riviera
16 November	Barcelona	Spain	Razzmatazz
18 November	Assago (Note: Labelled as Milan in promotional material.)	Italy	FilaForum
20 November	Berlin	Germany	Arena Berlin
21 November	Copenhagen	Denmark	Valby-Hallen
23 November	Stockholm	Sweden	Hovet Ice Hall
24 November	Oslo	Norway	Oslo Spektrum
6 December (Note: The concert in Tokyo on 6 December 2002 was an exclusive performance for the winners of a contest launched by J-Wave.)	Tokyo	Japan	Liquid Room
8 December (Note: The concert in Los Angeles on 8 December 2002 was part of the KROQ Almost Acoustic Christmas festival.)	Los Angeles	United States	Universal Amphitheatre
9 December (Note: The concert in San Francisco on 9 December 2002 was part of the KLLC Alice in Winterland festival.)	San Francisco	United States	Bimbo's 365 Club
11 December (Note: The concert in Boston on 11 December 2002 was part of the WBCN Christmas Rave festival.)	Boston	United States	Orpheum Theatre
12 December (Note: The concert in Uniondale on 12 December 2002 was part of the K-Rock Claus Fest.)	Uniondale	United States	Nassau Coliseum
13 December (Note: The concert in Washington, D.C. on 13 December 2002 was part of the WHFS HFSmas Nutcracker festival.)	Washington, D.C.	United States	MCI Center
15 December (Note: The concert in Philadelphia on 15 December 2002 was part of the WRNB Y100 Feastival.)	Philadelphia	United States	First Union Center
19 December	Reykjavík	Iceland	Laugardalshöll

List of 2003 concerts
Date (2003)	City	Country	Venue
21 January	Orlando	United States	Hard Rock Live
22 January	Coral Gables (Note: Labelled as Miami in promotional material.)	United States	UM Convocation Center
24 January	Birmingham	United States	BJCC Concert Hall
25 January	Charlotte	United States	Grady Cole Center
27 January	New Orleans	United States	Saenger Theatre
28 January	Houston	United States	Verizon Wireless Theater
29 January	Austin	United States	Frank Erwin Center
31 January	Grand Prairie (Note: Labelled as Dallas in promotional material.)	United States	NextStage Performance Theater
1 February	Oklahoma City	United States	Oklahoma City Music Hall
3 February	St. Louis	United States	Savvis Center
4 February	Kansas City	United States	Memorial Hall
6 February	Denver	United States	Fillmore Auditorium
7 February	Salt Lake City	United States	Salt Air Pavilion
9 February	Phoenix	United States	Dodge Theatre
24 February	Ottawa	Canada	Corel Centre
25 February	Montreal	Canada	Bell Centre
27 February	Wallingford (Note: Labelled as Hartford in promotional material.)	United States	careerbuilder.com Oakdale Theatre
28 February	Camden (Note: Labelled as Philadelphia in promotional material.)	United States	Tweeter Center
2 March	Pittsburgh	United States	A.J. Palumbo Center
3 March	Detroit	United States	Fox Theatre
4 March	Indianapolis	United States	Murat Theatre
6 March	Duluth (Note: Labelled as Atlanta in promotional material.)	United States	Gwinnett Civic Center Arena
7 March	Nashville	United States	Ryman Auditorium
9 March	Columbus	United States	PromoWest Pavilion
10 March	Louisville	United States	Palace Theatre
12 March	Milwaukee	United States	Eagles Ballroom
13 March	Minneapolis	United States	Target Center
24 March (Note: The concert in London on 24 March 2003 was a one-off charity performance for Teenage Cancer Trust.)	London	England	Royal Albert Hall
27 March	Lille	France	Zénith de Lille
30 March	Paris	France	Zénith de Paris
31 March	Frankfurt	Germany	Jahrhunderthalle
2 April	Münster	Germany	Halle Münsterland
3 April	Düsseldorf	Germany	Philipshalle
5 April	Böblingen	Germany	Sporthalle
6 April	Zürich	Switzerland	Hallenstadion
9 April	Lisbon	Portugal	Pavilhão Atlântico
10 April	Madrid	Spain	Palacio Vistalegre
11 April	Badalona (Note: Labelled as Barcelona in promotional material.)	Spain	Pavelló Olímpic de Badalona
14 April	Manchester	England	Manchester Evening News Arena
16 April	London	England	Earls Court Exhibition Centre
17 April	London	England	Earls Court Exhibition Centre
20 May	Edmonton	Canada	Shaw Conference Centre
21 May	Calgary	Canada	Pengrowth Saddledome
23 May	Vancouver	Canada	General Motors Place
24 May (Note: The concert in George on 24 May 2003 was part of the Sasquatch! Music Festival.)	George	United States	The Gorge Amphitheatre
25 May	Bend	United States	Les Schwab Amphitheater
27 May	Boise	United States	Bank of America Centre
28 May	Wheatland (Note: Labelled as Sacramento in promotional material.)	United States	AutoWest Amphitheatre
30 May	Mountain View	United States	Shoreline Amphitheatre
31 May	Los Angeles	United States	Hollywood Bowl
2 June	Los Angeles	United States	Hollywood Bowl
3 June	San Diego	United States	Cox Arena
5 June	Morrison (Note: Labelled as Denver in promotional material.)	United States	Red Rocks Amphitheatre
6 June	Morrison	United States	Red Rocks Amphitheatre
9 June	Chicago	United States	UIC Pavilion
10 June	Cleveland	United States	Tower City Amphitheater
11 June	Toronto	Canada	Molson Canadian Amphitheatre
13 June	New York City	United States	Madison Square Garden
20 June (Note: The concert in Scheeßel on 20 June 2003 was part of the Hurricane Festival.)	Scheeßel	Germany	Eichenring
21 June (Note: The concert in Neuhausen ob Eck on 21 June 2003 was part of the Southside Festival.)	Neuhausen ob Eck	Germany	Flugplatz Neuhausen ob Eck
23 June (Note: The concert in Rome on 23 June 2003 was part of the Cornetto Free Music Festival.)	Rome	Italy	Centrale del Tennis
24 June (Note: The concert in Fano on 24 June 2003 was part of the Il Violino e la Selce festival.)	Fano	Italy	Piazza XX Settembre
27 June (Note: The concert in Roskilde on 27 June 2003 was part of the Roskilde Festival.)	Roskilde	Denmark	Roskilde Dyrskueplads
29 June (Note: The concert in Werchter on 29 June 2003 was part of the Rock Werchter festival.)	Werchter	Belgium	Festivalpark Werchter
1 July (Note: The concert in Nijmegen on 1 July 2003 was part of the Nijmegen Festival.)	Nijmegen	Netherlands	Goffertpark
3 July (Note: The concert in Kristiansand on 3 July 2003 was part of the Quart Festival.)	Kristiansand	Norway	Idrettsplassen
12 July (Note: The concert in County Kildare on 12 July 2003 was part of the Witnness festival.)	County Kildare	Ireland	Punchestown Racecourse
13 July (Note: The concert in Kinross on 13 July 2003 was part of the T in the Park festival.)	Kinross	Scotland	Balado
18 July	Melbourne	Australia	Rod Laver Arena
20 July (Note: The concert in Byron Bay on 20 July 2003 was part of the Splendour in the Grass festival.)	Byron Bay	Australia	Belongil Fields
21 July	Sydney	Australia	Hordern Pavilion
22 July	Sydney	Australia	Hordern Pavilion
24 July	Auckland	New Zealand	Auckland Showgrounds
26 July (Note: The concert in Yuzawa on 26 July 2003 was part of the Fuji Rock Festival.)	Yuzawa	Japan	Naeba Ski Resort
29 July	Bangkok	Thailand	Impact Arena
16 August (Note: The concerts in Chelmsford and Weston-under-Lizard on 16 and 17 August 2003 were part of the V Festival.)	Chelmsford	England	Hylands Park
17 August	Weston-under-Lizard (Note: Labelled as Staffordshire in promotional material.)	England	Weston Park
3 September	São Paulo	Brazil	Via Funchal
4 September	Rio de Janeiro	Brazil	ATL Hall
7 September	Mexico City	Mexico	Palacio de los Deportes
8 September	Mexico City	Mexico	Palacio de los Deportes

== Cancelled shows ==
List of cancelled concerts
Date	City	Country	Venue	Reason	Ref.
25 June 2002	Portsmouth	England	Portsmouth Pyramids Centre	Unknown	
14 September 2002	Atlanta	United States	The Masquerade	Weather conditions	
28 March 2003	Strasbourg	France	Hall Rhénus	Illness	
5 June 2003	Albuquerque	United States	Tingley Coliseum	Unknown	

== Boxscores ==
List of reported boxscores
City	Venue	Attendance	Revenue
Boston	Paradise Rock Club	650 / 650	$5,500
Philadelphia	Theatre of Living Arts	810 / 810	$7,372
Washington, D.C.	9:30 Club	1,102 / 1,102	$11,571
Minneapolis	First Avenue	1,272 / 1,272	$14,554
Boulder	Fox Theatre	625 / 625	$21,875
Seattle	Paramount Theatre	2,857 / 2,857	$78,568
Berkeley	Hearst Greek Theatre	8,700 / 8,700	$254,700
San Diego	SDSU Open Air Theatre	4,425 / 4,798	$118,369
Los Angeles	Greek Theatre	6,138 / 6,138	$167,790
Baltimore	Pier Six Pavilion	3,860 / 4,400	$110,010
Boston	FleetBoston Pavilion	5,137 / 5,137	$146,130
Wantagh	Tommy Hilfiger at Jones Beach Theater	9,181 / 14,029	$265,324
Toronto	Air Canada Centre	6,061 / 6,061	$161,673
Chicago	UIC Pavilion	5,456 / 8,000	$163,680
Manchester	Manchester Evening News Arena	15,096 /15,160	$428,838
Rotterdam	Ahoy Rotterdam	9,765 / 9,765	$287,683
Orlando	Hard Rock Live	2,800 / 2,800	$90,960
Coral Gables	UM Convocation Center	5,947 / 5,947	$194,764
Birmingham	BJCC Concert Hall	2,915 / 2,915	$88,864
Charlotte	Grady Cole Center	2,900 / 2,900	$83,340
New Orleans	Saenger Theatre	2,534 / 2,534	$88,690
Houston	Verizon Wireless Theater	3,127 / 3,127	$96,145
Austin	Frank Erwin Center	4,731 / 6,290	$141,930
Grand Prairie	NextStage Performance Theater	5,952 / 6,333	$208,320
Oklahoma City	Oklahoma City Music Hall	2,263 / 2,263	$73,548
St. Louis	Savvis Center	4,329 / 5,024	$126,752
Kansas City	Memorial Hall	3,128 / 3,153	$95,040
Denver	Fillmore Auditorium	3,600 / 3,600	$108,000
Phoenix	Dodge Theatre	4,781 / 4,781	$139,960
Ottawa	Corel Centre	7,790 / 8,578	$171,736
Montreal	Bell Centre	11,784 / 12,414	$333,765
Wallingford	careerbuilder.com Oakdale Theatre	4,833 / 4,833	$157,760
Camden	Tweeter Center	6,874 / 6,874	$198,353
Pittsburgh	A.J. Palumbo Center	3,536 / 3,810	$107,234
Detroit	Fox Theatre	4,787 / 4,787	$141,585
Indianapolis	Murat Theatre	2,516 / 2,516	$77,708
Duluth	Gwinnett Civic Center Arena	7,084 / 7,084	$238,560
Nashville	Ryman Auditorium	2,179 / 2,179	$74,086
Columbus	PromoWest Pavilion	2,300 / 2,300	$64,400
Louisville	Palace Theatre	2,695 / 2,695	$84,110
Minneapolis	Target Center	8,146 / 9,481	$231,786
Manchester	Manchester Evening News Arena	15,504 / 15,636	$495,989
Edmonton	Shaw Conference Centre	4,497 / 4,500	$113,132
Calgary	Pengrowth Saddledome	9,012 / 9,844	$247,768
Vancouver	General Motors Place	11,955 / 13,628	$313,200
Bend	Les Schwab Amphitheater	5,200 / 5,200	$182,000
Boise	Bank of America Centre	2,408 / 3,100	$72,864
Wheatland	AutoWest Amphitheatre	8,500 / 8,500	$197,733
Mountain View	Shoreline Amphitheatre	20,217 / 21,895	$583,740
San Diego	Cox Arena	9,333 / 9,333	$324,322
Morrison	Red Rocks Amphitheatre	18,188 / 18,890 (Note: Report based on two shows instead of one.)	$617,778
Chicago	UIC Pavilion	8,728 / 8,728	$310,943
Cleveland	Tower City Amphitheater	8,334 / 8,334	$229,600
Toronto	Molson Canadian Amphitheatre	16,328 / 16,328	$324,707
New York City	Madison Square Garden	15,774 / 15,774	$582,760
Melbourne	Rod Laver Arena	10,482 / 10,500	$441,297
Sydney	Hordern Pavilion	10,410 / 10,500	$438,266
São Paulo	Via Funchal	5,642 / 5,642	$146,065
Rio de Janeiro	ATL Hall	7,750 / 7,750	$165,110
Mexico City	Palacio de los Deportes	39,408 / 39,408	$1,088,216
Total		422,336 / 442,212 (95.5%)	$12,536,523

== Personnel ==
Credits adapted from the band's official tour book, which was sold exclusively on merchandise booths and their online store.

Performing members

- Chris Martin – lead vocals, piano, keyboards, rhythm guitar
- Jonny Buckland – lead guitar, backing vocals, keyboards
- Guy Berryman – bass, backing vocals, keyboards, percussion
- Will Champion – drums, backing vocals, percussion

Main crew

- Brian Leitch – lighting designer
- Chris Woods – monitor engineer
- Craig Hope – backline technician
- Dan Green – FoH engineer
- Derek Fudge – production manager
- Dave Holmes – US band manager
- Jeff Dray – tour manager
- Dana White – Dave Holmes assistant
- Miller – gadget technician
- Nick Whitehouse – visual technician
- Sean Buttery – backline technician
- Shari Webber – production assistant
- Thomas Golseth – tour accountant
- Tony Smith – VDOSC technician
- Vicki Taylor – band assistant
- Rocky Hudson – security
- Matt McGinn – backline technician
- Holly Tickett – Estelle Wilkinson assistant
- Estelle Wilkinson – band manager
- Steve Strange – Europe/World agent
- Marty Diamond – US agent

Additional US crew

- Chris Conti
- David Favoritta
- Pat Thompson
- Bryan Kiger
- John Taylor
- Jim Lee
- Steve Capozza
- Glen Jones
- Sam Philips
- Eric Wagner
- Scotty Daum
- Jerry Martin
- Dave Cheek

Additional European crew

- Ben Holdsworth
- Ivan Ellison
- Jim Allison
- Tom James
- Alan Yates
- Stewart Kennet
- Aaron Hopkins
- Nick Davids
- Al McCauly
- Jerry Milichip
- Eddie Monk
- Jim Thompson
- Ian Heath
- Graham Dietricht
- John Burgess
- Matt Clarke
- Steven Connelly
- Ken Needham

Suppliers

- EFM Management – Andy Lovell, Mike Llewellyn
- Tour Tech – PA
- Siyan – lights
- Fly by Nite – trucks
- SilverGrey – buses
- Alistage – stage
- Pitstop – barrier
- XL Video – video
- Lasergrafix – laser
- Depot – rehearsals
- John Henry's – storage
- Matt Snowball Music – anything at any time
- Heidi Varah, Pauline Austin, Ben Albertson – catering
- Merchandising for Life – merchandise

Tour book

- Giles Greenwood, Joe Hosp – designer
- Kevin Westenberg – photographer
- Edwin Ingram – photographic printing
- Matt Wilson Labs – B&W

== See also ==
- List of Coldplay live performances
- List of highest-grossing live music artists

== Notes ==
Cities

Others
