= Viva la Vida Tour =

2008–2010 concert tour by Coldplay

- Tour by Coldplay
- Promotional insignia
- Location: Asia; Europe; North America; South America; Oceania
- Associated albums: Viva la Vida or Death and All His Friends; Prospekt's March
- Start date: 14 July 2008
- End date: 14 March 2010
- No. of shows: 165
- Producer: Live Nation
- Attendance: 3.02 million
- Box office: $222.2 million (Note: $328.06 million in 2025 dollars.)
- Website: coldplay.com/live

Coldplay concert chronology
- Twisted Logic Tour (2005–2007); Viva la Vida Tour (2008–2010); Mylo Xyloto Tour (2011–2012)

The Viva la Vida Tour was the fourth concert tour undertaken by British rock band Coldplay. It was launched in support of their fourth studio album, Viva la Vida or Death and All His Friends (2008), becoming a massive commercial and critical success. The tour visited Europe, Asia, Oceania and the Americas, further establishing the band as one of the biggest touring acts in the world.

The stage setup consisted of a stripped-down main stage and two catwalks; Coldplay also performed amongst audience members at the back of venues in a special acoustic set. Instead of a giant video screen on-stage, the band opted for six hanging giant spheres that displayed images, video and streamed closeups. Lead singer Chris Martin dubbed the fixtures as their "magic balls". During the introduction, "The Blue Danube" by Johann Strauss II was played before the band came into the stage. The tour visited arenas and stadiums in two separate phases: in London, they visited the O2 Arena in 2008 and the Wembley Stadium in 2009, with the latter show featuring a half-dome stage design.

Coldplay were accompanied by Oxfam during the tour. Volunteers were stationed at each venue to tell concert goers how to reduce poverty; the organization's logo and website was featured on one of the light ball fixtures during each show. On 23 July 2008, Coldplay performed their second in two shows at the United Center arena in Chicago. In each of the two shows, the band shot a music video for "Lost!" by performing the song twice. On 19 September 2008, Chris Martin was accompanied by A-ha keyboardist Magne Furuholmen in the encore at the Oslo Spektrum, Oslo, to play a cover of the A-ha song "Hunting High and Low".

== Visuals ==
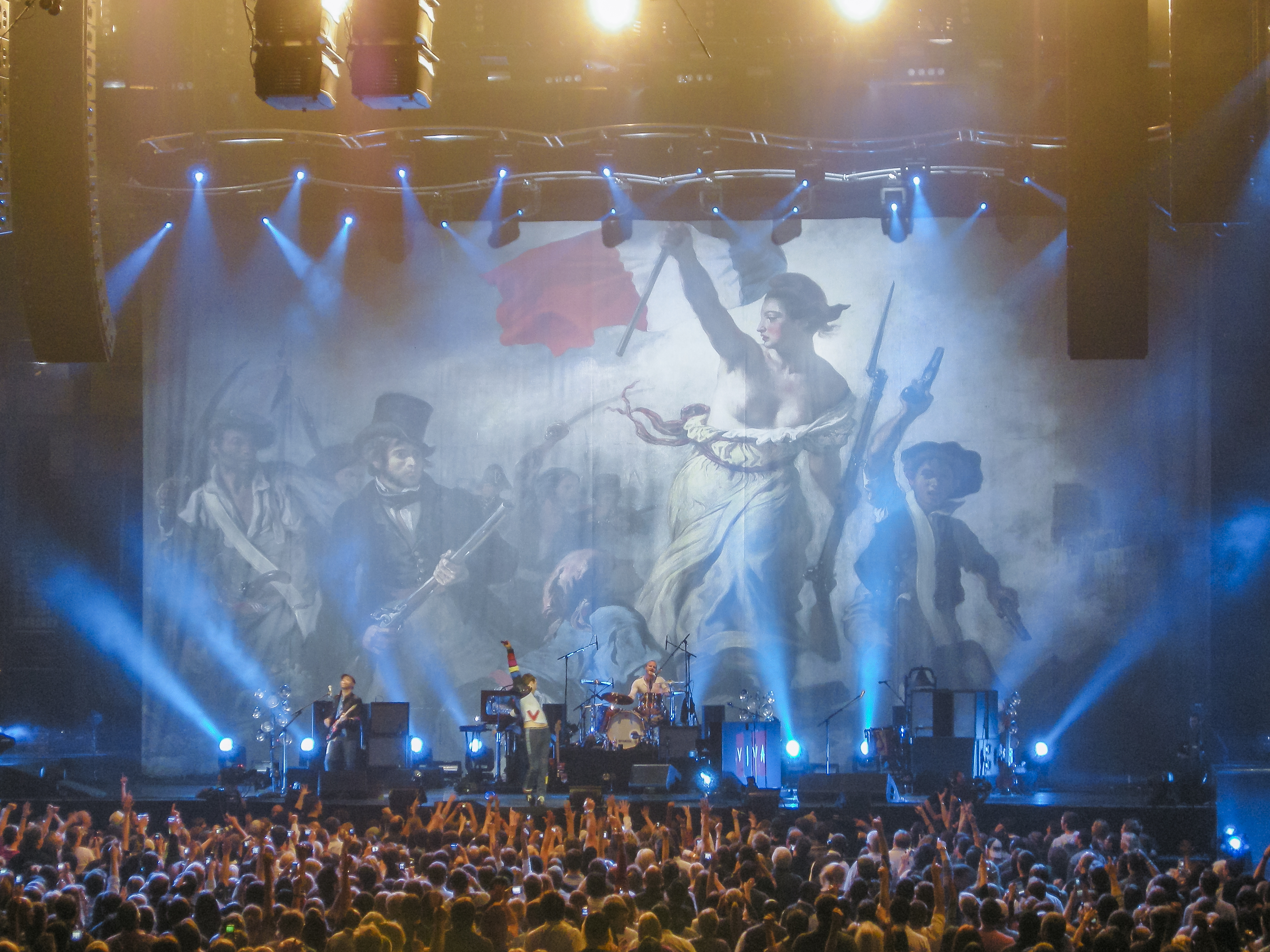
Viva la Vida Tour in Dallas, Texas

The intro of the concert would begin in space before turning to show the Earth and zooming to aerial views of the continent, country, city and then stadium that the show would take place. The idea was to make each show a spectacle of its own, instead of a mere part of the tour. The cosmic motif was repeated in "Speed of Sound" and "Glass of Water", taking attendees on a journey through a solar system where the stars formed an eye shape that went supernova, engulfing the screen in flames.

However, other sections of the show were completely different. "Lovers in Japan" used archive footage and animations across the screen at the back of the stage and butterflies made of confetti rained all over the venue in the end. For the show's closing number, "Life in Technicolor II", the paintings created for the book artwork of Viva la Vida or Death and All His Friends was treated with sprocket and projection effects to create a vibrant, immersive and colorful effect. The tour insignia, used on instruments and promotional material, was designed by the band members together and later painted on a wall by drummer Will Champion at the Bakery.

== Opening acts ==
There were 34 supporting acts for the tour. They are:

- Jon Hopkins (North America—Leg 1, select dates)
- Shearwater (North America—Leg 1, select dates)
- Santigold (North America—Leg 1, select dates) (Japan—February 2009)
- Sleepercar (North America—Leg 1, select dates)
- Duffy (North America—Leg 2, select dates)
- Snow Patrol (North America—Leg 3, select dates)
- Howling Bells (North America—Leg 3, select dates) (Europe—Leg 3, select dates)
- Pete Yorn (North America—Leg 3, select dates)
- Amadou & Mariam (North America—Leg 4, select dates)
- Kitty, Daisy & Lewis (North America—Leg 4, select dates)
- Elbow (North America—Leg 4, select dates) (Ireland—September 2009)
- Albert Hammond Jr (Europe—Leg 1)
- The High Wire (Europe—Leg 2, select dates)
- Eugene Francis Jnr and the Juniors and the Juniors (England—December 2008)
- The Domino State (London—14 December 2008)
- Kilians (Europe—Leg 3, select dates)
- Bat For Lashes (Europe—Leg 3, select dates) (South America)
- The Flaming Lips (Europe—Leg 3, select dates)
- White Lies (Europe—Leg 3, select dates)
- Moi Caprice (Denmark—August 2009)
- Datarock (Norway—August 2009)
- Ministri (Italy—August 2009)
- Pegasus (Switzerland—September 2009)
- The Sunday Drivers (Spain—September 2009)
- Miss Montreal (Netherlands—September 2009)
- Girls Aloud (Britain (Scotland and England)—September 2009)
- Jay-Z (Britain (Scotland and England)—September 2009)
- La Roux (England—December 2009)
- Decoder Ring (Australia)
- Hollie Smith (New Zealand)
- Mercury Rev (Australia) (New Zealand) (Asia—March 2009)
- The Ting Tings (Japan—February 2009)
- Vanguart (Brazil)

== Reception ==
In total, the tour grossed $222,256,153 from 3,022,635 tickets sold. Coldplay also broke the record for most admissions sold on a single tour at Sydney's Acer Arena, with 58,943 units. They later became the first act in history to perform a sold-out concert at Ridgefield's Amphitheater at Clark County. In 2025, Consequence ranked the Viva la Vida Tour among the 100 Best Tours of All Time, at number 82.

== Accolades ==
List of awards and nominations
Year	Ceremony	Category	Result	Ref.
2008	Los40 Music Awards	Best Tour	Nominated	
2008	Parnelli Awards	Tour Manager of the Year (Andy Franks)	Nominated	
2009	Helpmann Awards	Best International Contemporary Concert	Nominated	
2009	Parnelli Awards	Lighting Company of the Year (Upstaging)	Nominated	
2009	Parnelli Awards	Lighting Designer of the Year (Paul Normandale)	Nominated	
2009	Parnelli Awards	Tour Manager of the Year (Andy Franks)	Nominated	
2009	Pollstar Awards	Major Tour of the Year	Nominated	
2010	Pollstar Awards	Major Tour of the Year	Nominated	

== Set list ==
United Center, Chicago, 23 July 2008

Source: Hartford Courant.

Main stage

1. "Life in Technicolor"
2. "Violet Hill"
3. "Clocks"
4. "In My Place"
5. "Viva la Vida"
6. "Yes"
7. "42"
8. "Fix You"
9. "Strawberry Swing"

B-stage

10. "Chinese Sleep Chant"
11. "God Put a Smile upon Your Face"
12. "Speed of Sound"
13. "Yellow"
14. "Lost!"
15. "Lost!" (for the music video)

C-stage

16. "The Scientist"
17. "Death Will Never Conquer"

Encore

18. "Politik"
19. "Lovers in Japan"
20. "Death and All His Friends"
21. "The Dubliners"
22. "Green Eyes"
Wembley Stadium, 18–19 September 2009

Main stage

1. "Life in Technicolor"
2. "Violet Hill"
3. "Clocks"
4. "In My Place"
5. "Glass of Water"
6. "Yellow"
7. "Cemeteries of London"
8. "42"
9. "Fix You"
10. "Strawberry Swing"

B-stage

11. "God Put a Smile Upon Your Face" / "Talk"
12. "The Hardest Part" / "Postcards from Far Away"
13. "Viva la Vida"
14. "Lost+" (with Jay-Z)

C-stage

15. "Rhyming Song"
16. "Death Will Never Conquer"
17. "Trouble"
18. "Billie Jean" (Michael Jackson cover)

Encore

19. "Politik"
20. "Lovers in Japan"
21. "Death and All His Friends"
22. "The Scientist"
23. "Life in Technicolor ii"
Estadio Monumental, Buenos Aires, 26 February 2010

Main stage

1. "Life in Technicolor"
2. "Violet Hill"
3. "Clocks"
4. "In My Place"
5. "Parachutes"
6. "Yellow"
7. "Glass of Water"
8. "42"
9. "Fix You"
10. "Strawberry Swing"

B-stage

11. "God Put a Smile Upon Your Face" / "Talk"
12. "The Hardest Part" / "Postcards from far Away"
13. "Viva La Vida"
14. "Lost!"

C-stage

15. "Death Will Never Conquer"
16. "Billie Jean"
17. "Don Quixote"

Encore

18. "Politik"
19. "Lovers in Japan"
20. "Death and All His Friends"
21. "The Scientist"
22. "Life in Technicolor ii"

== Tour dates ==
List of 2008 concerts
Date (2008)	City	Country	Venue	Opening acts	Attendance	Revenue
14 July	Inglewood (Note: Labelled as Los Angeles in promotional material.)	United States	The Forum	Shearwater	30,085 / 30,438	$2,487,994
15 July	Inglewood	United States	The Forum	Shearwater	30,085 / 30,438	$2,487,994
18 July (Note: The concert in San Jose on 18 July 2008 was originally planned for 24 July 2008, but it was rescheduled due to logistical reasons.)	San Jose	United States	HP Pavilion	Jon Hopkins	15,325 / 15,838	$1,219,849
19 July	Paradise (Note: Labelled as Las Vegas in promotional material.)	United States	MGM Grand Garden Arena	Jon Hopkins	14,058 / 14,058	$1,262,926
22 July	Chicago	United States	United Center	Jon Hopkins	29,815 / 31,056	$2,425,592
23 July (Note: The concert in Chicago on 23 July 2008 was originally planned for 4 August 2008, but it was rescheduled due to logistical reasons.)	Chicago	United States	United Center	Jon Hopkins	29,815 / 31,056	$2,425,592
25 July (Note: The concert in Philadelphia on 25 July 2008 was originally planned for 29 June 2008, but it was rescheduled due to logistical reasons.)	Philadelphia	United States	Wachovia Center	Jon Hopkins	16,738 / 16,738	$1,395,623
27 July (Note: The concert in Pemberton on 27 July 2008 was part of the Pemberton Festival.)	Pemberton	Canada	Mount Currie	—N/a	—N/a	—N/a
29 July (Note: The concert in Montreal on 29 July 2008 was originally planned for 20 October 2008, but it was rescheduled due to logistical reasons.)	Montréal	Canada	Bell Centre	Jon Hopkins	17,259 / 17,259	$1,415,268
30 July (Note: The concerts in Toronto on 30 and 31 July 2008 were originally planned for 29 and 30 October 2008, but they were rescheduled due to logistical reasons.)	Toronto	Canada	Air Canada Centre	Shearwater	33,908 / 33,908	$2,954,646
31 July	Toronto	Canada	Air Canada Centre	Shearwater	33,908 / 33,908	$2,954,646
2 August (Note: The concert in Hartford on 2 August 2008 was originally planned for 3 July 2008, but it was rescheduled due to logistical reasons.)	Hartford	United States	XL Center	Jon Hopkins	12,589 / 12,589	$993,924
3 August (Note: The concert in Washington, D.C. on 3 August 2008 was originally planned for 2 July 2008, but it was rescheduled due to logistical reasons.)	Washington, D.C.	United States	Verizon Center	Jon Hopkins	15,760 / 15,760	$1,354,878
4 August (Note: The concert in Boston on 4 August 2008 was originally planned for 3 November 2008, but it was rescheduled due to logistical reasons.)	Boston	United States	TD Banknorth Garden	Jon Hopkins	14,445 / 14,445	$1,229,417
9 August (Note: The concerts in Osaka and Chiba on 9 and 10 August 2008 were part of the Summer Sonic Festival.)	Osaka	Japan	Maishima Sports Island	—N/a	—N/a	—N/a
10 August	Chiba (Note: Labelled as Tokyo in promotional material.)	Japan	Chiba Marine Stadium	—N/a	—N/a	—N/a
1 September	Strasbourg	France	Zénith de Strasbourg	High Wire; Albert Hammond Jr.	11,074 / 11,074	$673,108
2 September	Mannheim	Germany	SAP Arena	High Wire; Albert Hammond Jr.	12,441 / 12,441	$906,935
4 September	Lyon	France	Halle Tony Garnier	High Wire; Albert Hammond Jr.	16,648 / 16,648	$1,038,147
6 September	Barcelona	Spain	Palau Sant Jordi	High Wire; Albert Hammond Jr.	17,828 / 17,960	$1,221,409
7 September	Madrid	Spain	Palacio de Deportes	High Wire; Albert Hammond Jr.	15,499 / 15,548	$1,058,986
9 September	Paris	France	Palais Omnisports de Paris-Bercy	High Wire; Albert Hammond Jr.	32,800 / 32,800	$2,298,435
10 September	Paris	France	Palais Omnisports de Paris-Bercy	High Wire; Albert Hammond Jr.	32,800 / 32,800	$2,298,435
12 September	Cologne	Germany	Kölnarena	High Wire; Albert Hammond Jr.	16,105 / 16,105	$1,180,183
14 September	Hamburg	Germany	Color Line Arena	High Wire; Albert Hammond Jr.	12,558 / 12,558	$918,045
15 September	Berlin	Germany	O2 World	High Wire; Albert Hammond Jr.	14,362 / 14,362	$1,034,744
17 September	Stockholm	Sweden	Stockholm Globe Arena	High Wire; Albert Hammond Jr.	28,043 / 28,510	$1,873,058
18 September	Stockholm	Sweden	Stockholm Globe Arena	High Wire; Albert Hammond Jr.	28,043 / 28,510	$1,873,058
19 September	Oslo	Norway	Oslo Spektrum	High Wire; Albert Hammond Jr.	8,064 / 8,213	$671,173
22 September	Prague	Czech Republic	O2 Arena	High Wire; Albert Hammond Jr.	14,889 / 15,000	$905,311
23 September	Budapest	Hungary	Budapest Sports Arena	High Wire; Albert Hammond Jr.	11,159 / 11,466	$780,851
24 September	Vienna	Austria	Wiener Stadthalle	High Wire; Albert Hammond Jr.	13,340 / 13,340	$960,526
26 September (Note: The concert in Munich on 26 September 2008 was broadcast on radio by Absolute Radio.)	Munich	Germany	Olympiahalle	High Wire; Albert Hammond Jr.	11,805 / 11,805	$910,652
28 September	Zürich	Switzerland	Hallenstadion	High Wire; Albert Hammond Jr.	Unknown	Unknown
29 September	Bologna	Italy	PalaMalaguti	High Wire; Albert Hammond Jr.	Unknown	Unknown
30 September	Assago (Note: Labelled as Milan in promotional material.)	Italy	DatchForum	High Wire; Albert Hammond Jr.	11,218 / 11,218	$700,365
2 October	Rotterdam	Netherlands	Ahoy Rotterdam	High Wire; Albert Hammond Jr.	21,600 / 21,600	$1,355,736
3 October	Rotterdam	Netherlands	Ahoy Rotterdam	High Wire; Albert Hammond Jr.	21,600 / 21,600	$1,355,736
4 October	Antwerp	Belgium	Sportpaleis	High Wire; Albert Hammond Jr.	16,774 / 16,774	$949,556
20 October (Note: The concert in Ottawa on 20 October 2008 was originally planned for 21 October 2008, but it was rescheduled due to logistical reasons.)	Ottawa	Canada	Scotiabank Place	Snow Patrol	12,121 / 15,082	$943,317
21 October (Note: The concert in Cleveland on 21 October 2008 was originally planned for 6 July 2008, but it was rescheduled due to logistical reasons.)	Cleveland	United States	Quicken Loans Arena	Snow Patrol	Unknown	Unknown
26 October	East Rutherford	United States	Izod Center	Snow Patrol	32,460 / 32,460	$1,382,442
27 October	East Rutherford	United States	Izod Center	Snow Patrol	32,460 / 32,460	$1,382,442
29 October	Boston	United States	TD Banknorth Garden	Snow Patrol	14,559 / 14,559	$1,256,599
31 October	Washington, D.C.	United States	Verizon Center	Snow Patrol	14,158 / 14,158	$1,188,903
1 November	Philadelphia	United States	Wachovia Center	Snow Patrol	16,068 / 16,068	$1,299,252
3 November (Note: The concert in Auburn Hills on 3 November 2008 was originally planned for 5 July 2008, but it was rescheduled due to logistical reasons.)	Auburn Hills (Note: Labelled as Detroit in promotional material.)	United States	The Palace of Auburn Hills	Snow Patrol	13,330 / 13,330	$1,015,289
5 November	Atlanta	United States	Philips Arena	Snow Patrol	28,648 / 28,648 (Note: The concerts in Atlanta on 5 and 11 November 2008 had their data combined into a single boxscore.)	$2,266,353
7 November	Orlando	United States	Amway Arena	Snow Patrol	Unknown	Unknown
9 November	Sunrise (Note: Labelled as Fort Lauderdale in promotional material.)	United States	BankAtlantic Center	Snow Patrol	15,096 / 15,096	$1,258,098
11 November	Atlanta	United States	Philips Arena	Snow Patrol		
13 November (Note: The concert in Kansas City on 13 November 2008 was originally planned for 9 July 2008, but it was rescheduled due to logistical reasons.)	Kansas City	United States	Sprint Center	Pete Yorn	Unknown	Unknown
14 November (Note: The concert in Saint Paul on 14 November 2008 was originally planned for 8 July 2008, but it was rescheduled due to logistical reasons.)	Saint Paul	United States	Xcel Energy Center	Pete Yorn	14,922 / 16,010	$1,245,529
16 November (Note: The concert in Oklahoma City on 16 November 2008 was originally planned for 10 July 2008, but it was rescheduled due to logistical reasons.)	Oklahoma City	United States	Ford Center	Pete Yorn	Unknown	Unknown
18 November	Houston	United States	Toyota Center	Pete Yorn	13,981 / 13,981	$1,192,576
19 November	Dallas	United States	American Airlines Center	Pete Yorn	15,483 / 16,430	$1,308,581
21 November	Denver	United States	Pepsi Center	Pete Yorn	11,656 / 11,656	$1,019,790
22 November	Salt Lake City	United States	EnergySolutions Arena	Pete Yorn	11,598 / 11,598	$935,607
25 November	Anaheim	United States	Honda Center	Pete Yorn	13,649 / 13,649	$1,115,426
26 November	Glendale (Note: Labelled as Phoenix in promotional material.)	United States	Jobing.com Arena	Pete Yorn	13,257 / 13,257	$1,010,272
29 November (Note: The concert in Sheffield on 29 November 2008 was originally planned for 7 December 2008, but it was rescheduled due to "reasons beyond Coldplay's control".)	Sheffield	England	Sheffield Arena	Bat for Lashes; Kilians	Unknown	Unknown
1 December	Birmingham	England	National Indoor Arena	Bat for Lashes; Kilians	Unknown	Unknown
2 December	Birmingham	England	National Indoor Arena	Bat for Lashes; Kilians	Unknown	Unknown
3 December	Birmingham	England	National Indoor Arena	Bat for Lashes; Kilians	Unknown	Unknown
6 December	Glasgow	Scotland	SEC Centre	White Lies	Unknown	Unknown
7 December (Note: The concert in Liverpool on 7 December 2008 was originally planned for 10 December 2008, but it was rescheduled due to "reasons beyond Coldplay's control".)	Liverpool	England	Echo Arena Liverpool	White Lies	Unknown	Unknown
9 December (Note: The concert in Glasgow on 9 December 2008 was originally planned for 5 December 2008, but it was rescheduled due to "reasons beyond Coldplay's control".)	Glasgow	Scotland	SEC Centre	White Lies	Unknown	Unknown
11 December	Manchester	England	Manchester Evening News Arena	Eugene Francis Jnr	30,798 / 31,136	$1,926,622
12 December	Manchester	England	Manchester Evening News Arena	Eugene Francis Jnr	30,798 / 31,136	$1,926,622
14 December	London	England	The O2 Arena	The Domino State	51,294 / 52,500	$2,967,477
15 December	London	England	The O2 Arena	Eugene Francis Jnr	51,294 / 52,500	$2,967,477
16 December	London	England	The O2 Arena	Eugene Francis Jnr	51,294 / 52,500	$2,967,477
19 December	Belfast	Northern Ireland	Odyssey Arena	The Flaming Lips	8,400 / 8,532	$542,752
21 December	Dublin	Ireland	O_{2} Dublin	The Flaming Lips	16,280 / 16,280	$1,087,926
22 December	Dublin	Ireland	O_{2} Dublin	The Flaming Lips	16,280 / 16,280	$1,087,926
23 December (Note: The concert in Belfast on 23 December 2008 was originally planned for 18 December 2008, but it was rescheduled due to "reasons beyond Coldplay's control".)	Belfast	Northern Ireland	Odyssey Centre	The Flaming Lips	Unknown	Unknown

List of 2009 concerts
Date (2009)	City	Country	Venue	Opening acts	Attendance	Revenue
11 February	Saitama	Japan	Saitama Super Arena	Santigold; The Ting Tings	33,000 / 36,000	$2,571,030
12 February (Note: The concert in Saitama on 12 February 2009 was broadcast on television by MTV.)	Saitama	Japan	Saitama Super Arena	Santigold; The Ting Tings	33,000 / 36,000	$2,571,030
14 February	Kobe (Note: Labelled as Osaka in promotional material.)	Japan	Kobe World Kinen Hall	Santigold; The Ting Tings	12,000 / 12,000	$1,202,040
15 February	Kobe	Japan	Kobe World Kinen Hall	Santigold; The Ting Tings	12,000 / 12,000	$1,202,040
27 February	Perth	Australia	Burswood Dome	Decoder Ring; Mercury Rev	29,004 / 32,908	$2,519,941
28 February	Perth	Australia	Burswood Dome	Decoder Ring; Mercury Rev	29,004 / 32,908	$2,519,941
3 March	Melbourne	Australia	Rod Laver Arena	Decoder Ring; Mercury Rev	37,385 / 38,901	$3,244,512
4 March	Melbourne	Australia	Rod Laver Arena	Decoder Ring; Mercury Rev	37,385 / 38,901	$3,244,512
5 March	Melbourne	Australia	Rod Laver Arena	Decoder Ring; Mercury Rev	37,385 / 38,901	$3,244,512
8 March	Brisbane	Australia	Brisbane Entertainment Centre	Decoder Ring; Mercury Rev	22,692 / 22,950	$1,940,206
9 March	Brisbane	Australia	Brisbane Entertainment Centre	Decoder Ring; Mercury Rev	22,692 / 22,950	$1,940,206
11 March	Sydney	Australia	Acer Arena	Decoder Ring; Mercury Rev	59,391 / 60,852	$5,013,032
12 March	Sydney	Australia	Acer Arena	Decoder Ring; Mercury Rev	59,391 / 60,852	$5,013,032
14 March	Sydney	Australia	Acer Arena	Decoder Ring; Mercury Rev	59,391 / 60,852	$5,013,032
15 March	Sydney	Australia	Acer Arena	Decoder Ring; Mercury Rev	59,391 / 60,852	$5,013,032
18 March	Auckland	New Zealand	Vector Arena	Hollie Smith; Mercury Rev	20,808 / 21,562	$1,701,308
19 March	Auckland	New Zealand	Vector Arena	Hollie Smith; Mercury Rev	20,808 / 21,562	$1,701,308
23 March	Singapore		Singapore Indoor Stadium	Mercury Rev	9,474 / 9,503	$1,162,883
25 March	Hong Kong	China	AsiaWorld–Arena	Mercury Rev	11,371 / 11,550	$1,430,719
28 March	Abu Dhabi	United Arab Emirates	Emirates Palace	Mercury Rev	Unknown	Unknown
15 May	West Palm Beach	United States	Cruzan Amphitheatre	N/A	Unknown	Unknown
17 May	Atlanta	United States	Lakewood Amphitheatre	N/A	14,071 / 18,658	$801,194
18 May	Pelham (Note: Labelled as Birmingham in promotional material.)	United States	Verizon Wireless Music Center	N/A	8,230 / 10,259	$650,881
20 May	Virginia Beach	United States	Verizon Wireless Amphitheater	N/A	15,877 / 20,055	$447,086
21 May	Bristow (Note: Labelled as Washington, D.C. in promotional material.)	United States	Nissan Pavilion	N/A	14,157 / 23,241	$624,814
23 May	Hartford	United States	Comcast Theatre	N/A	13,877 / 24,713	$705,687
24 May	Hershey	United States	Hersheypark Stadium	N/A	10,414 / 13,530	$755,940
26 May	Camden (Note: Labelled as Philadelphia in promotional material.)	United States	Susquehanna Bank Center	N/A	13,741 / 25,317	$902,234
30 May	Burgettstown (Note: Labelled as Pittsburgh in promotional material.)	United States	Post-Gazette Pavilion	N/A	13,084 / 23,214	$565,068
1 June	Darien (Note: Labelled as Buffalo in promotional material.)	United States	Darien Lake Performing Arts Center	N/A	12,481 / 21,193	$691,814
2 June	Clarkston	United States	DTE Energy Music Theatre	N/A	13,797 / 15,202	$801,754
4 June	Cincinnati	United States	Riverbend Music Center	N/A	15,375 / 20,383	$812,638
5 June	Noblesville (Note: Labelled as Indianapolis in promotional material.)	United States	Verizon Wireless Music Center	N/A	19,825 / 24,680	$1,021,922
6 June	Nashville	United States	Sommet Center	N/A	13,130 / 13,130	$1,242,039
9 June	New Orleans	United States	New Orleans Arena	N/A	11,574 / 12,247	$898,682
10 June	San Antonio	United States	AT&T Center	N/A	13,152 / 13,152	$964,467
12 June	Des Moines	United States	Wells Fargo Arena	N/A	10,749 / 10,751	$616,158
13 June	Omaha	United States	Qwest Center Omaha	N/A	9,629 / 10,636	$748,532
15 June	Winnipeg	Canada	MTS Centre	N/A	12,619 / 12,619	$1,002,900
17 June	Calgary	Canada	Pengrowth Saddledome	N/A	13,841 / 13,841	$1,146,083
18 June	Edmonton	Canada	Rexall Place	N/A	14,413 / 14,413	$1,126,333
20 June	Vancouver	Canada	General Motors Place	N/A	29,923 / 29,923	$2,382,026
21 June	Vancouver	Canada	General Motors Place	N/A	29,923 / 29,923	$2,382,026
2 July (Note: The concert in Arras on 2 July 2009 was part of the Main Square Festival.)	Arras	France	Grand-Place d'Arras	—N/a	—N/a	—N/a
3 July (Note: The concert in Werchter on 3 July 2009 was part of the Rock Werchter festival.)	Werchter	Belgium	Festivalpark Werchter	—N/a	—N/a	—N/a
5 July (Note: The concert in Roskilde on 5 July 2009 was part of the Roskilde Festival.)	Roskilde	Denmark	Roskilde Dyrskueplads	—N/a	—N/a	—N/a
10 July	Ridgefield (Note: Labelled as Portland in promotional material.)	United States	Amphitheater at Clark County	Amadou and Mariam; Kitty, Daisy & Lewis	17,526 / 17,526	$1,030,852
11 July	George	United States	The Gorge Amphitheatre	Amadou and Mariam; Kitty, Daisy & Lewis	21,939 / 21,939	$1,166,654
13 July	Mountain View (Note: Labelled as San Francisco in promotional material.)	United States	Shoreline Amphitheatre	Amadou and Mariam; Kitty, Daisy & Lewis	22,052 / 22,325	$1,103,165
14 July	Wheatland (Note: Labelled as Sacramento in promotional material.)	United States	Sleep Train Amphitheatre	Amadou and Mariam; Kitty, Daisy & Lewis	13,339 / 18,500	$543,960
16 July	Chula Vista (Note: Labelled as San Diego in promotional material.)	United States	Cricket Wireless Amphitheatre	Amadou and Mariam; Kitty, Daisy & Lewis	19,588 / 19,588	$1,186,216
18 July	Carson	United States	The Home Depot Center	Amadou and Mariam; Kitty, Daisy & Lewis	26,341 / 27,404	$2,105,859
19 July	Irvine	United States	Verizon Wireless Amphitheatre	Amadou and Mariam; Kitty, Daisy & Lewis	14,885 / 14,885	$1,020,168
21 July	Dallas	United States	SuperPages.com Center	Amadou and Mariam; Kitty, Daisy & Lewis	19,878 / 19,938	$1,109,879
22 July	The Woodlands (Note: Labelled as Houston in promotional material.)	United States	Cynthia Woods Mitchell Pavilion	Amadou and Mariam; Kitty, Daisy & Lewis	16,430 / 16,430	$917,266
24 July	Maryland Heights	United States	Verizon Wireless Amphitheater	Amadou and Mariam; Kitty, Daisy & Lewis	19,055 / 21,000	$997,943
25 July	East Troy	United States	Alpine Valley Music Theatre	Kitty, Daisy & Lewis; Elbow	27,123 / 34,883	$1,300,838
27 July (Note: The concert in Saratoga Springs on 27 July 2009 was originally planned for 27 May 2009, but it was rescheduled due to illness.)	Saratoga Springs	United States	Saratoga Performing Arts Center	Kitty, Daisy & Lewis; Elbow	15,200 / 25,277	$816,097
30 July	Toronto	Canada	Rogers Centre	Kitty, Daisy & Lewis; Elbow	45,116 / 45,116	$3,231,201
1 August (Note: The concert in Montreal on 1 August 2009 was part of the Osheaga Festival.)	Montreal	Canada	Parc Jean-Drapeau	—N/a	—N/a	—N/a
2 August (Note: The concert in Jersey City on 2 August 2009 was part of the All Points West Music & Arts Festival.)	Jersey City	United States	Liberty State Park	—N/a	—N/a	—N/a
3 August	Mansfield	United States	Comcast Center	Kitty, Daisy & Lewis; Elbow	19,846 / 19,953	$1,509,579
6 August	Raleigh	United States	Time Warner Cable Music Pavilion	Kitty, Daisy & Lewis; Elbow	19,422 / 19,422	$905,170
7 August	Charlotte	United States	Verizon Wireless Amphitheatre	Kitty, Daisy & Lewis; Elbow	18,830 / 18,830	$1,109,275
16 August	Herning	Denmark	MCH Outdoor Arena	White Lies; Moi Caprice	33,737 / 40,000	$3,247,607
19 August	Bergen	Norway	Koengen	White Lies; Datarock	21,945 / 21,945	$2,418,699
22 August	Stockholm	Sweden	Stockholm Olympic Stadium	White Lies	32,651 / 33,137	$2,335,422
25 August	Hanover	Germany	AWD-Arena	White Lies; Killians	35,007 / 39,118	$2,605,296
27 August	Düsseldorf	Germany	LTU Arena	Howling Bells; Killians	41,859 / 44,991	$3,494,278
29 August	Munich	Germany	Olympia-Reitstadion Riem	Howling Bells; Killians	30,000 / 30,000	$2,228,420
31 August	Udine	Italy	Stadio Friuli	White Lies; Ministri	41,042 / 42,549	$2,350,340
2 September	Bern	Switzerland	Stade de Suisse	Howling Bells; Pegasus	Unknown	Unknown
4 September	Barcelona	Spain	Estadi Olímpic Lluís Companys	Flaming Lips; The Sunday Drivers	63,306 / 64,376	$4,562,424
7 September	Paris	France	Parc des Princes	Flaming Lips; Bat For Lashes	50,335 / 51,241	$4,246,798
9 September	Nijmegen	Netherlands	Goffertpark	Flaming Lips; Bat For Lashes	Unknown	Unknown
10 September	Nijmegen	Netherlands	Goffertpark	White Lies; Miss Montreal	Unknown	Unknown
12 September	Manchester	England	Old Trafford Cricket Ground	Jay-Z; White Lies	Unknown	Unknown
14 September	Dublin	Ireland	Phoenix Park	Jay-Z; White Lies	34,372 / 35,000	$3,441,696
16 September	Glasgow	Scotland	Hampden Park	Jay-Z; White Lies	35,011 / 35,011	$2,452,358
18 September	London	England	Wembley Stadium	Jay-Z; Girls Aloud; White Lies	Unknown	Unknown
19 September	London	England	Wembley Stadium	Jay-Z; Girls Aloud; White Lies	Unknown	Unknown

List of 2010 concerts
Date (2010)	City	Country	Venue	Opening acts	Attendance	Revenue
26 February	Buenos Aires	Argentina	Estadio River Plate	Bat for Lashes; Banda de Turistas; Rosal	53,708 / 59,266	$3,265,556
28 February	Rio de Janeiro	Brazil	Praça da Apoteose	Bat for Lashes; Vanguart	26,821 / 34,960	$2,947,627
2 March	São Paulo	Brazil	Estádio do Morumbi	Bat for Lashes; Vanguart	53,060 / 63,842	$5,257,415
4 March	Bogotá	Colombia	Simón Bolívar Park	Bat for Lashes; Estados Alterados	32,356 / 33,000	$3,458,594
6 March	Mexico City	Mexico	Foro Sol	Bat for Lashes; Le Baron	94,005 / 112,320	$5,400,944
7 March	Mexico City	Mexico	Foro Sol	Bat for Lashes; Le Baron	94,005 / 112,320	$5,400,944
9 March	Zapopan (Note: Labelled as Guadalajara in promotional material.)	Mexico	Estadio Tres de Marzo	Bat for Lashes; Le Baron	27,557 / 28,772	$2,040,743
11 March	San Nicolás (Note: Labelled as Monterrey in promotional material.)	Mexico	Estadio Universitario	Bat for Lashes; Le Baron	34,091 / 37,766	$2,414,466
Total					2,247,811 / 2,440,817 (92%)	$179,056,876

== Cancelled shows ==
List of cancelled concerts
Date (2009)	City	Country	Venue	Reason	Ref.
29 May	Scranton	United States	Toyota Pavilion	Scheduling conflict	
27 July	Wantagh (Note: Labelled as Jones Beach in promotional material.)	United States	Jones Beach Theater	Scheduling conflict	(Note: Tickets for the concert in Wantagh on 27 July 2009 never went on sale.)
9 August	Tampa	United States	Ford Amphitheatre	Illness	

== Personnel ==
Credits adapted from the band's official tour book, which was sold exclusively on merchandise booths and their online store.

Performing members

- Chris Martin – lead vocals, piano, keyboards, rhythm guitar
- Jonny Buckland – lead guitar, backing vocals, keyboards
- Guy Berryman – bass, backing vocals, keyboards, percussion
- Will Champion – drums, backing vocals, percussion

Main crew

- Dave Holmes – manager
- Andy Franks – tour manager
- Phil Harvey – creative director
- Vicki Taylor – artist assistant and instrument painting
- Emma Jane McDonald – artist assistant
- Paul Normandale – production designer
- Craig Finley – production manager
- Dan Green – FoH sound
- Fraser Elisha – lighting director
- Chris Wood – monitor engineer
- Yasmine Kotb – tour accountant
- Kurt Wagner – stage manager
- Marguerite Nguyen – production assistant
- Craig Hope – backline technician
- Matt McGinn – guitar technician
- Sean Buttery – drum technician
- Neil Lambert – backline technician
- Matt Miller – MIDI technician and videographer
- Tony Smith – FoH assistant
- Nick Davis – monitor technician
- Stephanie Thompson – RF technician

Video

- Andy Bramley – video director and content
- Ed Jarman – video engineer and crew chief
- Ben Miles – catalyst and content
- Mathew Vassalo – projectionist

Video crew

- Jason Lowe
- Phil Johnson

Lighting crew

- Dave Favourita (chief)
- Tommy Green
- Wayne Kwiat
- Niall Ogilvy
- David Cox (UK)
- Dave Jolly (UK)
- Marta Iwan (US)
- Jim Michaelis (US)

Sound technicians

- Rob Collett (UK)
- Owen McAuley (UK)
- Simon Rogers (UK)
- Jim Allen (US)
- Stephan Curtain (US)
- Carlos Sallaberry (US)

Stage

- Rick Stucker – head carpenter
- Russell Macias – carpenter
- Gabriel Wood – head rigger
- Charles Anderson – rigger
- Brooke Blomquist – confetti
- Mike Hartle – laser
- Tiffany Henry – dressing rooms and wardrobe

Security

- Jackie Jackson – venue security
- Kelly Samuels – band security
- Geoff Sands – band security

Merchandise

- Dell Furano, Rick Fish, Pete Weber – Signatures Network
- Jeremy Joseph – De-Lux
- Eric Wagner – product development and road manager
- Joe Heden – US Road Merchandise
- Jon Ellis – UK Road Merchandise

Catering

- Heidi Varah – chief
- Darren Shead – head chef
- Pauline Austin – chef
- Sarah Money – FoH
- Jessie Collins – FoH

Management

- Mandi Bursteen, Ivan Entchevitch – Dave Holmes assistant
- Lauren Valencia, Arlene Moon – 3D Management

Booking agents

- Marty Diamond, Larry Webman – North America
- Steve Strange, Josh Javor, Nicki Forestiero – ROW

Suppliers

- Chapman Freeborne – aircraft charter
- Matt Snowball Music – anything at any time
- Stars and Cars – Europe artist transport
- Moorcrofts – UK artist transport
- DPL – US artist transport
- Beat the Street – UK buses
- Celebrity Coaches – US buses
- Global Motion – freight forwarder
- Robertson Taylor Insurance Brokers – insurance brokers
- Lite Alt – UK lighting
- Upstaging – US lighting
- All Access – passes
- Strictly FX – confetti and lasers
- Wigwam – UK sound
- Eighth Day – US sound
- John Henry's – storage
- Celebrity Protection – tour security
- Music by Appointment – UK travel
- Altour – US travel
- Stagetruck – UK trucks
- Upstaging – US trucks
- XL Video – video

77 Million Paintings

- Brian Eno – paintings and music

Website

- Wendy Marvel, Brian Schulmeister – designer
- Chris Salmon – editor
- Debs Wild – ambassador

Creative input

- Brian Eno
- Markus Dravs
- Tim Crompton
- Lee Lodge

Tour book

- Wendy Marvel, Eric Wagner – designer
- Matthew Miller – front cover designer
- William Garland – lithography

Photos courtesy of

- Guy Berryman
- Stephan Crasneanscki
- James Gooding
- Dan Green
- Penny Howle
- Matthew Miller
- Greg Waterman

Others

- Lester Dales, Maul Makin – accounting
- Donna McQueen, Tracy Lawson – assistant
- David Weise – business management
- Gavin Maude – legal
- Pete Lusby – Oxfam UK representative
- Soha Yassine – Oxfam US representative
- Dan Portanier – trainer
- Rik Simpson – additional musical production
- Andy Rugg – additional engineering
- Beth Fenton – stage uniforms designer

Special thanks

- Alison Burton
- Air Studios
- All bus and truck drivers

== See also ==
- List of Coldplay live performances
- List of highest-grossing live music artists

== Notes ==
Cities

Others
