= Twisted Logic Tour =

2005–2007 concert tour by Coldplay

- Tour by Coldplay
- Promotional poster
- Location: Asia; Europe; North America; South America; Oceania
- Associated album: X&Y
- Start date: 15 June 2005
- End date: 4 March 2007
- No. of shows: 139
- Attendance: 2.05 million
- Box office: $105.8 million (Note: $164.12 million in 2025 dollars.)
- Website: coldplay.com

Coldplay concert chronology
- A Rush of Blood to the Head Tour (2002–2003); Twisted Logic Tour (2005–2007); Viva la Vida Tour (2008–2010)

The Twisted Logic Tour was the third concert tour undertaken by British rock band Coldplay. It was launched in support of their third studio album, X&Y (2005), on 15 June 2005 in Hamburg. Before the concert run, they embarked on a series of warm-up shows, which included their first performance at Coachella and an appearance at HFStival.

After the Asian leg, the band decided to rest for an extended period to record Viva la Vida or Death and All His Friends (2008), wrapping the tour with a Latin American run in 2007. It was Coldplay's only tour to not be named after an album; the group chose a song which they never performed live. The tour grossed $105.8 million from 2.05 million tickets sold in 132 reported dates.

== Background ==
The Twisted Logic Tour is noted for its use of extravagant stage effects. Strobe lights and various other fixtures were used to create an elaborate light show. The back of the stage contained a two-story panoramic video panel that displayed live footage and computer generated images, from video of a bear wandering aimlessly during "Talk" to a montage of coloured blocks from the cover of X&Y during the song "Clocks".

Other concert highlights include:

- A digital countdown display shown on the panoramic video screen during the song "Square One" as the band enter the stage. The timer reaches zero at the song's explosive first chorus, followed by the crowd getting showered by red, green, and blue strobe lighting.
- Chris Martin changing a lyric section of "Politik" into something related to the venue or a recent news event. For example, during their 2006 Toronto concert, Chris Martin changed the lyrics to "It's Thursday, March the 23rd, 2006, thank you for giving us your evening, and thanks for coming and being in our film". This line was made in reference to the fact that the concert was later featured in a made for television film. This was also done with the song "God Put a Smile Upon Your Face" in some shows.
- Confetti, and yellow balloons filled with gold glitter showered on the audience during the song "Yellow" (a homage to The Flaming Lips).
- During Coachella 2005 Martin sang the outro to "The Scientist" backwards, reminiscent of the song's music video. During much of the tour, the entire track was played backwards live, after the band had finished playing it regularly. The Charles and Ray Eames video "Powers of Ten" played in the background.
- Martin running into the crowd during "In My Place" to sing with the audience.
- Band members taking photographs before and during the show with disposable cameras before throwing them into the crowd. This was bassist Guy Berryman's idea, and was usually done during the reverse playing of "The Scientist".
- The band taking to the edge of the stage and performing an acoustic set of 2-3 of the following songs: "Til Kingdom Come", "Don't Panic", "Green Eyes", "Trouble" and/or a cover of Johnny Cash's "Ring of Fire" or Bob Dylan's "Simple Twist of Fate".
- Martin sometimes encouraging the audience to let their camera flashes off simultaneously as the band picks up during the bridge of "Talk", but also done during "Low" via a message on the main screen behind the band, resulting in a dramatic explosion of light. "Talk" also featured Martin taking an audience member's mobile phone and singing to the person on the other end, which was a common occurrence.
- Martin swinging a suspended lightbulb above his head after the second chorus of "Fix You", followed, in outdoor shows, by fireworks as the drum fill begins. This would later be featured in the song's music video.
- A laser light show during "Clocks", with red lasers shooting out in different directions. These were reintroduced during the second North American leg of the tour.
- A handwritten list of songs being projected toward the stage during "Swallowed in the Sea". This is presumably an early tracklist of songs during production of X&Y.
- The band gradually increasing the tempo of "Clocks" at the end of its regular performance, until it abruptly concludes at a ridiculously high tempo.
- During the Australian leg of the tour, the band made several references to the Socceroos in the 2006 FIFA World Cup by altering lyrics of the songs. On the second night of the Melbourne concerts and the final night of the Sydney concerts, the group performed the Kylie Minogue hit "Can't Get You Out of My Head" as a tribute to Australia and its music industry.
- At some concerts in Germany, Chris Martin asked the audience in German "Wo geht es zum Bahnhof?" ("How do you get to the train station?"). This may be a reference to the U2 song "Zoo Station".
- During performances of "White Shadows", thermal black and white imagery of the band performing appeared on the panoramic big screen. This was done in homage of the song title, as these kind of images can produce "white shadows" of heat producing sources.

During the tour, the band wore matching outfits consisting of black jackets, black trousers, and white shoes; of this, Chris Martin said: "There's great security in looking over at Jonny and seeing he's wearing the same coloured shoes as me. I suppose it's the same reason the army wears a uniform - so that you feel part of a clan. And when we're all dressed that way, I just feel very much like, it's OK, coz I'm part of this team."

== Opening acts ==
Most of the tour included at least one supporting act on each concert, with English singer Richard Ashcroft opening all the German, Dutch, and Italian performances of the first European leg. He was accompanied by Kettcar, Tomte, and Vertigo in selected dates. Morning Runner became the main guest in Ireland and the United Kingdom, while Interpol (22 and 27 June), Supergrass (28 June to 2 July), Elbow (4 July) and Doves (5 July) featured as additional supports. The first North American leg had Black Mountain until 26 August, as Rilo Kiley took over the remaining dates. For the second European run, Coldplay invited Goldfrapp (mainland) and Ashcroft (United Kingdom). The latter returned in the final North American leg after Fiona Apple played from 25 January to 5 March 2006. The rest of the tour saw the band visiting Asia, Oceania and Latin America: Youth Group opened in Australia, while Saiko, Brian Storming, Papas da Língua, Volován supported in Chile, Argentina, Brazil and Mexico, respectively.

== Concert synopsis ==
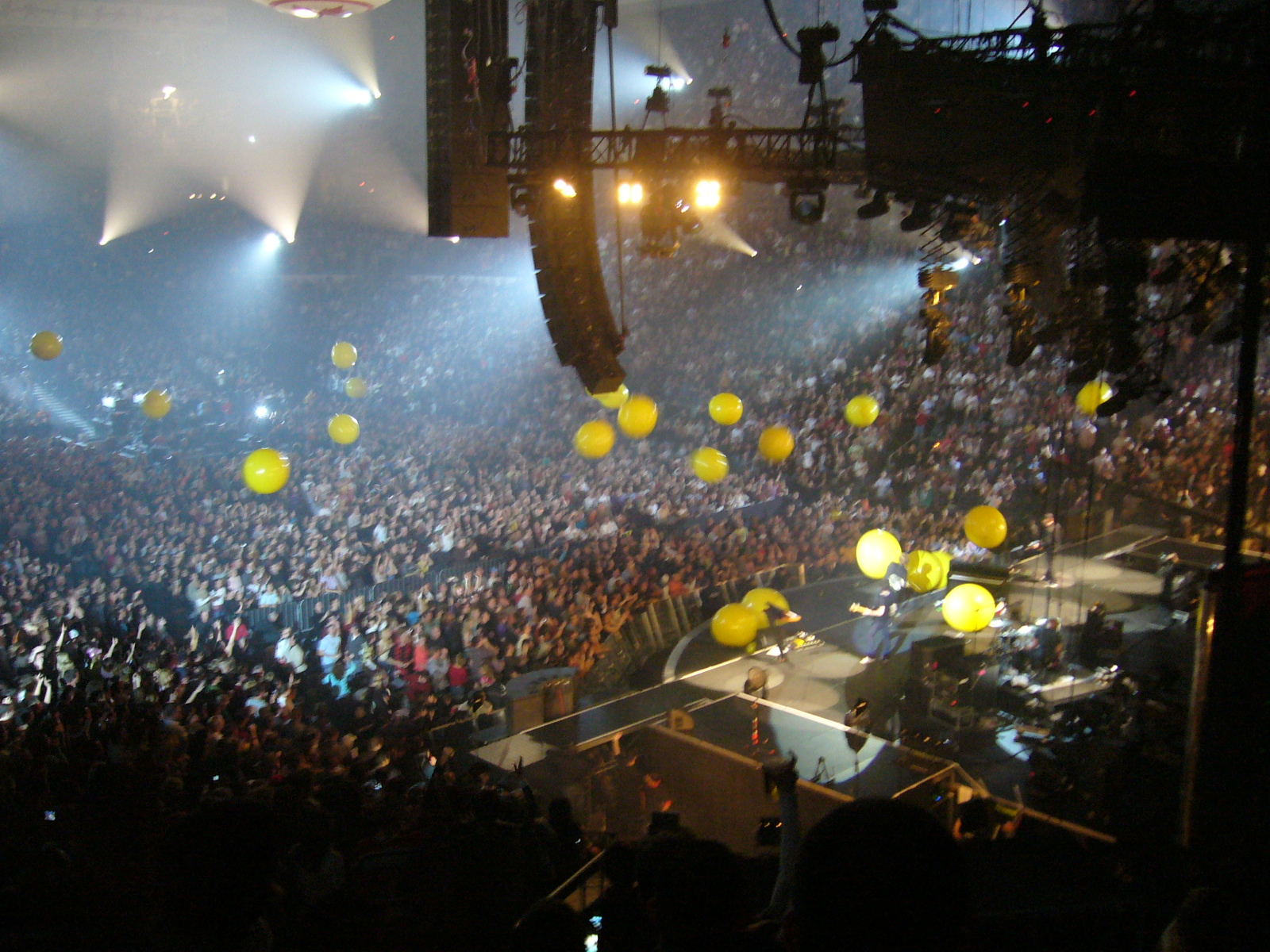
"Yellow" being performed at the Air Canada Centre, 2006

The Twisted Logic Tour's set list was heavily weighted towards tracks from X&Y since the tour promoted the album. The remaining material was mostly from A Rush of Blood to the Head with songs such as "Politik", "In My Place", "Clocks", and "The Scientist", and to a lesser extent "Don't Panic", "Yellow", and "Trouble" being the only holdovers from Parachutes played with regularity. The only new song played on the tour was "How You See the World No. 2" which was from the "Help: A Day in the Life" benefit album. Earlier tours such as those in the Parachutes era debuted work-in-progress versions of tracks that would appear on A Rush of Blood to the Head. Likewise, Coldplay's newest compositions during the Rush of Blood to the Head Tour such as "Gravity", and "Proof" were included as B-sides to X&Y's singles.

The introductory music played at the start of each concert was either Brand Nubian's "Meaning of the 5%" or "Tomorrow Never Knows" by The Beatles. The closing music is "Good Night" by The Beatles. The following is a sample setlist of a concert at the Verizon Wireless Amphitheater in Bonner Springs, Kansas, United States. The major changes to this set for the other tour dates mainly saw "X&Y" and "Low" performed in lieu of "What If". Often, variations of these songs being played with one another occurred, such as "What If" and "Low". Also, "Parachutes" was often performed between "Yellow" and "Speed of Sound", and "Green Eyes" was sometimes added to the B-stage set.

== Reception ==
The tour grossed an average of $801,780 from 15,599 tickets sold each night, leading to $105,834,960 grossed from 2,059,068 admissions in 132 dates. Coldplay moved 608,441 entries with the 2005 shows, securing the eleventh-most-attended run of the year. They also received a nomination for Major Tour of the Year at the 2006 Pollstar Awards, while PRG was shortlisted for Lighting Company of the Year at the 6th Parnelli Awards after working with the band.

== Video release ==
A concert film was shot at the Air Canada Centre in Toronto on 22 and 23 March 2006. The band announced its DVD release in March but it was only shown in television channels like Canada's Much Music, under the name Coldplay: How We Saw the World – Live in Toronto. The airing date was 14 December 2006 at 9 pm and replays occurred at midnight and 3:30 pm on 15 December. Due to the lack of airplay on mainstream channels, the show has been heavily shared illegally on the internet.

== Set list ==
This set list was taken from the 23 March 2006 concert in Toronto, Canada. It does not represent all shows throughout the tour.

Main stage

1. "Square One"
2. "Politik"
3. "Yellow"
4. "Speed of Sound"
5. "God Put a Smile upon Your Face"
6. "What If"
7. "How You See the World No. 2"
8. "Don't Panic"
9. "White Shadows"
10. "The Scientist"

B-stage

11. "Til Kingdom Come"
12. "Ring of Fire" (Johnny Cash cover)
13. "Trouble"

Main stage

14. "Clocks"
15. "Talk"

Encore

16. "Swallowed in the Sea"
17. "In My Place"
18. "Fix You"

== Tour dates ==
List of 2005 concerts
Date (2005)	City	Country	Venue
15 June	Hamburg	Germany	Volkspark
17 June	Cologne	Germany	Fühlinger See
19 June	Berlin	Germany	Parkbühne Wuhlheide
22 June	Dublin	Ireland	Marlay Park
25 June (Note: The concert in Pilton on 25 June 2005 was part of the Glastonbury Festival.)	Pilton	England	Worthy Farm
27 June	London	England	Crystal Palace National Sports Centre
28 June	London	England	Crystal Palace National Sports Centre
1 July	Glasgow	Scotland	Bellahouston Park
2 July	Glasgow	Scotland	Bellahouston Park
4 July	Horwich (Note: Labelled as Bolton in promotional material.)	England	Reebok Stadium
5 July	Horwich	England	Reebok Stadium
7 July	Arnhem	Netherlands	GelreDome
9 July	Munich	Germany	Coubertinplatz
10 July (Note: The concert in Mank on 10 July 2005 was part of the Nuke Festival.)	Mank (Note: Labelled as Sankt Pölten in promotional material.)	Austria	Festivalgelände Pielachtal
11 July	Verona	Italy	Verona Arena
13 July (Note: The concert in Locarno on 13 July 2005 was part of the Moon & Stars festival.)	Locarno	Switzerland	Piazza Grande
14 July (Note: The concert in Six-Fours-les-Plages on 14 July 2005 was part of the Les Voix du Gaou festival.)	Six-Fours-les-Plages	France	Île Gaou
29 July (Note: The concert in Yuzawa on 29 July 2005 was part of the Fuji Rock Festival.)	Yuzawa	Japan	Naeba Ski Resort
2 August	Toronto	Canada	Air Canada Centre
3 August	Montreal	Canada	Bell Centre
4 August	Hartford	United States	New England Dodge Music Center
6 August	Mansfield (Note: Labelled as Boston in promotional material.)	United States	Tweeter Center for the Performing Arts
7 August	Camden (Note: Labelled as Philadelphia in promotional material.)	United States	Tweeter Center at the Waterfront
9 August	Cincinnati	United States	Riverbend Music Center
11 August	Burgettstown (Note: Labelled as Pittsburgh in promotional material.)	United States	Post-Gazette Pavilion
12 August	Noblesville (Note: Labelled as Indianapolis in promotional material.)	United States	Verizon Wireless Music Center
13 August	East Troy	United States	Alpine Valley Music Theatre
16 August	Auburn (Note: Labelled as Seattle in promotional material.)	United States	White River Amphitheatre
17 August	Ridgefield (Note: Labelled as Portland in promotional material.)	United States	The Amphitheater at Clark County
19 August	Mountain View (Note: Labelled as San Francisco in promotional material.)	United States	Shoreline Amphitheatre
20 August	Irvine	United States	Verizon Wireless Amphitheatre
21 August	Irvine	United States	Verizon Wireless Amphitheatre
24 August	Albuquerque	United States	Journal Pavilion
25 August	Phoenix	United States	Cricket Pavilion
26 August	Chula Vista (Note: Labelled as San Diego in promotional material.)	United States	Cricket Wireless Amphitheatre
30 August	Clarkston (Note: Labelled as Detroit in promotional material.)	United States	DTE Energy Music Theatre
31 August	Columbus	United States	Germain Amphitheater
1 September (Note: The concert in Darien Center on 1 September 2005 was originally planned for 4 September 2005, but it was rescheduled due to unknown reasons.)	Darien Center	United States	Darien Lake Performing Arts Center
3 September	Holmdel	United States	PNC Bank Arts Center
6 September	New York City	United States	Madison Square Garden
7 September	New York City	United States	Madison Square Garden
9 September	Charlotte	United States	Verizon Wireless Amphitheatre
10 September	Raleigh	United States	Alltel Pavilion
13 September	West Palm Beach	United States	Sound Advice Amphitheatre
17 September	Maryland Heights (Note: Labelled as St. Louis in promotional material.)	United States	UMB Bank Pavilion
18 September	Nashville	United States	Starwood Amphitheatre
20 September	Minneapolis	United States	Target Center
21 September	Bonner Springs (Note: Labelled as Kansas City in promotional material.)	United States	Verizon Wireless Amphitheater
23 September	Dallas	United States	Smirnoff Music Center
25 September (Note: The concert in Austin on 25 September 2005 was part of the Austin City Limits Music Festival.)	Austin	United States	Zilker Park
28 September	Atlanta	United States	Philips Arena
29 September	Virginia Beach	United States	Verizon Wireless Amphitheater
30 September	Bristow (Note: Labelled as Washington, D.C. in promotional material.)	United States	Nissan Pavilion
26 October	Antwerp	Belgium	Sportpaleis
28 October	Oberhausen	Germany	Arena Oberhausen
30 October	Copenhagen	Denmark	Forum Copenhagen
31 October	Oslo	Norway	Oslo Spektrum
7 November	Stockholm	Sweden	Stockholm Globe Arena
9 November	Leipzig	Germany	Arena Leipzig
10 November	Mannheim	Germany	SAP Arena
12 November	Zürich	Switzerland	Hallenstadion
14 November	Milan	Italy	FilaForum
15 November	Bologna	Italy	PalaMalaguti
17 November	Marseille	France	Le Dôme de Marseille
18 November	Toulouse	France	Zénith de Toulouse
20 November	Barcelona	Spain	Palau Sant Jordi
22 November	Madrid	Spain	Palacio de Deportes
23 November	Lisbon	Portugal	Pavilhão Atlântico
25 November	San Sebastián	Spain	Velódromo de Anoeta
28 November	Lyon	France	Halle Tony Garnier
29 November	Paris	France	Palais Omnisports de Paris-Bercy
30 November	Antwerp	Belgium	Sportpaleis
14 December	London	England	Earls Court Exhibition Centre
15 December	London	England	Earls Court Exhibition Centre
16 December	London	England	Earls Court Exhibition Centre
18 December	Newcastle	England	Telewest Arena
19 December	Manchester	England	Manchester Evening News Arena
21 December	Belfast	Northern Ireland	Odyssey Centre

List of 2006 concerts
Date (2006)	City	Country	Venue
25 January	Seattle	United States	KeyArena
26 January	Vancouver	Canada	General Motors Place
27 January	Vancouver	Canada	General Motors Place
30 January	Sacramento	United States	ARCO Arena
31 January	Oakland	United States	Oakland Arena
1 February	San Jose	United States	HP Pavilion
3 February	Paradise (Note: Labelled as Las Vegas in promotional material.)	United States	MGM Grand Garden Arena
4 February	Inglewood (Note: Labelled as Los Angeles in promotional material.)	United States	The Forum
6 February	Anaheim	United States	Arrowhead Pond of Anaheim
7 February	Anaheim	United States	Arrowhead Pond of Anaheim
19 February	Denver	United States	Pepsi Center
20 February	Omaha	United States	Qwest Center Omaha
22 February	Auburn Hills	United States	The Palace of Auburn Hills
23 February	Louisville	United States	Freedom Hall
25 February	Houston	United States	Toyota Center
26 February	Dallas	United States	American Airlines Center
27 February	Oklahoma City	United States	Ford Center
2 March	Washington, D.C.	United States	MCI Center
4 March	Orlando	United States	TD Waterhouse Centre
5 March (Note: The concert in Tampa on 5 March 2006 was originally planned for 14 September 2005, but it was rescheduled due to illness.)	Tampa	United States	Ford Amphitheatre
17 March	Ottawa	Canada	Scotiabank Place
19 March	Milwaukee	United States	BMO Harris Bradley Center
20 March	Cleveland	United States	Quicken Loans Arena
22 March	Toronto	Canada	Air Canada Centre
23 March	Toronto	Canada	Air Canada Centre
25 March	East Rutherford	United States	Continental Airlines Arena
26 March	Uniondale	United States	Nassau Coliseum
27 March	Uniondale	United States	Nassau Coliseum
30 March	Chicago	United States	United Center
31 March	Chicago	United States	United Center
3 April	Manchester	United States	Verizon Wireless Arena
4 April	Uncasville	United States	Mohegan Sun Arena
6 April	Philadelphia	United States	Wachovia Center
11 June (Note: The concert in Newport on 11 June 2006 was part of the Isle of Wight Festival.)	Newport	England	Seaclose Park
23 June	Brisbane	Australia	Brisbane Entertainment Centre
24 June	Brisbane	Australia	Brisbane Entertainment Centre
26 June	Sydney	Australia	Sydney Entertainment Centre
27 June	Sydney	Australia	Sydney Entertainment Centre
28 June	Sydney	Australia	Sydney Entertainment Centre
1 July	Melbourne	Australia	Rod Laver Arena
2 July	Melbourne	Australia	Rod Laver Arena
3 July	Melbourne	Australia	Rod Laver Arena
5 July	Adelaide	Australia	Adelaide Entertainment Centre
7 July	Perth	Australia	Burswood Dome
10 July (Note: The concert in Singapore on 10 July 2006 was broadcast on television by MTV Asia.)	Singapore		Singapore Indoor Stadium
13 July	Hong Kong	China	AsiaWorld–Arena
15 July	Osaka	Japan	Intex Osaka
17 July	Nagoya	Japan	Nagoya Rainbow Hall
18 July	Tokyo	Japan	Nippon Budokan
19 July	Tokyo	Japan	Nippon Budokan

List of 2007 concerts
Date (2007)	City	Country	Venue
14 February	Santiago	Chile	Espacio Riesco
15 February	Santiago	Chile	Espacio Riesco
16 February	Santiago	Chile	Espacio Riesco
20 February	Buenos Aires	Argentina	Teatro Gran Rex
21 February	Buenos Aires	Argentina	Teatro Gran Rex
22 February	Buenos Aires	Argentina	Teatro Gran Rex
26 February	São Paulo	Brazil	Via Funchal
27 February	São Paulo	Brazil	Via Funchal
28 February	São Paulo	Brazil	Via Funchal
3 March	Mexico City	Mexico	Auditorio Nacional
4 March	Mexico City	Mexico	Auditorio Nacional

== Cancelled shows ==
List of cancelled concerts
Date (2005)	City	Country	Venue	Reason	Ref.
16 September	Pelham (Note: Labelled as Birmingham in promotional material.)	United States	Verizon Wireless Music Center	Illness	
24 September	The Woodlands (Note: Labelled as Houston in promotional material.)	United States	Cynthia Woods Mitchell Pavilion	Hurricane Rita	

== Boxscores ==
List of reported boxscores
City	Venue	Attendance	Revenue
Toronto	Air Canada Centre	16,066 / 16,066	$879,676
Montreal	Bell Centre	15,703 / 16,000	$848,423
Hartford	New England Dodge Music Center	22,909 / 22,909	$793,901
Mansfield	Tweeter Center for the Performing Arts	19,923 / 19,923	$914,602
Camden	Tweeter Center at the Waterfront	25,331 / 25,331	$1,060,869
Cincinnati	Riverbend Music Center	16,212 / 16,212	$588,496
Burgettstown	Post-Gazette Pavilion	14,865 / 23,102	$439,771
Noblesville	Verizon Wireless Music Center	17,954 / 24,712	$702,970
East Troy	Alpine Valley Music Theatre	32,591 / 35,510	$1,216,509
Auburn	White River Amphitheatre	16,588 / 19,536	$674,116
Ridgefield	The Amphitheater at Clark County	11,128 / 17,620	$525,255
Mountain View	Shoreline Amphitheatre	22,000 / 22,000	$810,600
Irvine	Verizon Wireless Amphitheatre	30,443 / 32,172 (Note: Report based on two shows instead of one.)	$1,518,283
Albuquerque	Journal Pavilion	8,383 / 12,197	$326,330
Phoenix	Cricket Pavilion	15,416 / 20,061	$654,764
Chula Vista	Cricket Wireless Amphitheatre	19,027 / 19,027	$669,787
Clarkston	DTE Energy Music Theatre	15,509 / 15,509	$691,400
Columbus	Germain Amphitheater	17,315 / 20,000	$565,299
Darien	Darien Lake Performing Arts Center	15,048 / 21,700	$602,871
Holmdel	PNC Bank Arts Center	16,944 / 16,944	$696,859
New York City	Madison Square Garden	31,861 / 31,861	$1,767,792
Charlotte	Verizon Wireless Amphitheatre	18,787 / 18,787	$652,021
Raleigh	Alltel Pavilion	20,000 / 20,000	$549,626
West Palm Beach	Sound Advice Amphitheatre	18,265 / 18,787	$711,133
Maryland Heights	UMB Bank Pavilion	16,918 / 21,275	$624,082
Nashville	Starwood Amphitheatre	16,601 / 17,160	$559,431
Minneapolis	Target Center	12,732 / 12,732	$590,333
Bonner Springs	Verizon Wireless Amphitheater	14,703 / 18,000	$497,156
Dallas	Smirnoff Music Center	19,380 / 19,702	$746,655
Atlanta	Philips Arena	14,557 / 14,557	$752,540
Virginia Beach	Verizon Wireless Amphitheater	12,175 / 20,040	$459,763
Bristow	Nissan Pavilion	22,552 / 23,029	$973,524
Manchester	Manchester Evening News Arena	16,906 / 17,346	$980,170
Seattle	KeyArena	13,050 / 13,050	$810,486
Vancouver	General Motors Place	29,400 / 29,400	$1,940,954
Sacramento	ARCO Arena	13,702 / 13,798	$735,167
Oakland	Oakland Arena	13,727 / 13,727	$965,316
San Jose	HP Pavilion	13,335 / 13,545	$859,242
Paradise	MGM Grand Garden Arena	14,439 / 14,439	$952,348
Inglewood	The Forum	15,222 / 15,387	$1,062,356
Anaheim	Arrowhead Pond of Anaheim	27,261 / 27,808	$1,935,720
Denver	Pepsi Center	14,798 / 14,798	$928,584
Omaha	Qwest Center Omaha	14,787 / 14,787	$840,113
Auburn Hills	The Palace of Auburn Hills	16,219 / 16,219	$949,298
Louisville	Freedom Hall	13,253 / 13,253	$652,966
Houston	Toyota Center	14,344 / 14,544	$902,168
Dallas	American Airlines Center	14,729 / 15,663	$1,038,928
Oklahoma City	Ford Center	13,818 / 13,818	$774,125
Washington, D.C.	MCI Center	16,111 / 16,111	$1,129,173
Orlando	TD Waterhouse Centre	13,312 / 13,895	$847,397
Tampa	Ford Amphitheatre	18,706 / 18,706	$779,971
Ottawa	Scotiabank Place	15,191 / 15,191	$978,813
Milwaukee	BMO Harris Bradley Center	11,626 / 15,202	$758,574
Cleveland	Quicken Loans Arena	13,503 / 16,724	$693,641
Toronto	Air Canada Centre	34,834 / 34,834	$2,190,741
East Rutherford	Continental Airlines Arena	17,934 / 17,934	$1,175,643
Uniondale	Nassau Coliseum	26,531 / 27,266	$1,795,638
Chicago	United Center	33,391 / 33,790	$2,329,361
Manchester	Verizon Wireless Arena	10,003 / 10,003	$731,231
Uncasville	Mohegan Sun Arena	5,993 / 5,993	$359,580
Philadelphia	Wachovia Center	16,777 / 16,777	$1,081,985
Brisbane	Brisbane Entertainment Centre	22,145 / 22,832	$1,656,259
Sydney	Sydney Entertainment Centre	35,491 / 37,200 (Note: Report based on three shows instead of one.)	$2,587,470
Melbourne	Rod Laver Arena	35,173 / 36,000	$2,594,453
Adelaide	Adelaide Entertainment Centre	9,528 / 9,528	$730,992
Perth	Burswood Dome	16,448 / 18,186	$1,234,159
Buenos Aires	Teatro Gran Rex	9,039 / 9,039	$674,869
Mexico City	Auditorio Nacional	19,276 / 19,276	$1,067,296
Total		1,227,888 / 1,308,530 (93.8%)	$65,790,024

== Personnel ==
Credits adapted from the band's official tour book, which was sold exclusively on merchandise booths and their online store.

Performing members

- Chris Martin – lead vocals, piano, keyboards, rhythm guitar
- Jonny Buckland – lead guitar, backing vocals, keyboards
- Guy Berryman – bass, backing vocals, keyboards, percussion
- Will Champion – drums, backing vocals, percussion

Main crew

- Dave Holmes – manager
- Estelle Wilkinson – manager
- Rina Silverman – Dave Holmes assistant
- Holly Tickett – Estelle Wilkinson assistant
- Andy Franks – tour manager
- Tom Golseth – tour accountant
- Vicki Taylor – band assistant
- Kelly Samuels – head of band security
- Geoff Sands – band security
- Dave White – venue security
- Dan Portanier – trainer
- Wayne Griggs – DJ
- Audrey Nugent – tour assistant
- Derek Fudge – production manager
- Steve Iredale – site coordinator
- Shari Weber – production assistant
- Dan Green – FoH engineer
- Bryan Leitch – show designer
- Nick Whitehouse – lighting director
- Alan Yates – video director
- Chris Wood – monitor engineer
- Eric Benbow – stage manager
- Craig Hope – backline technician
- Matt McGinn – backline technician
- Sean Buttery – drum technician
- Matt Miller – MIDI technician, tour documentor
- Tony Smith – CVE
- Rob Allan – FoH technician
- Stewart Kennett – monitor technician
- Tom James – drapage
- Arran Hopkins – LED technician
- Andy Bramley – vision mixer

Rigging

- Jim Allison (chief)
- Rueben Pinkney

Lighting

- Ben Holdsworth (chief)
- Tim Massey
- David Mathieson
- Iestyn Thomas
- Oli James
- Ivan Ellison

Camera

- Ruory MacPhee
- Mark Antoniuk

Sound technicians

- Nick David
- Rob Collett

Catering

- Heidi Varah – catering crew chief
- Ben Albertson – chef

Catering crew

- Pauline Austin
- Emma Jane MacDonald
- Dan Gamble
- Sharon Jackson

Merch

- Jeremy Joseph
- Dell Furano
- Rick Fish
- Don Hunt
- Pete Weber
- Eric Wagner
- Ken MacAlpine

Truck drivers

- John Burgess
- Matt Clark
- Paul Edwards
- Chris Helslop
- Tony Coolidge
- Dave Clark
- Richard Knock
- Mel Bonner

Bus drivers

- Tony Biddiscombe
- Paul Maynard
- Chris Cox

Van drivers

- Melanie Meglin
- Tanja Stuerglinger
- Harald Weber
- Vedran Banic
- Gunther Frank
- Ines Wauters

Suppliers

- Air Charters – aircraft charter
- Matt Snowball Music – anything at any time
- Stars and Cars – Europe artist transport
- Moorcrofts of London – UK artist transport
- Trathens Star-Riders – buses
- Eat to the Beat – catering
- EFM Management – freight forwarder
- Robertson Taylor – insurance brokers
- LaserGrafix – LED screens
- Siyan – lighting
- Music Bank – rehearsals
- Publicity & Display – passes
- Pyrovision – pyrotechnics
- Tour Tech – sound
- John Henry's – storage
- Celebrity Protection – tour security
- The Appointment Group – travel
- Fly by Night – trucks
- Picture Works – video

Photography

- Kevin Westenberg – principal band photography
- Penny Howle – live band photography
- Size Creative – image retouching

Website

- Debs Wild – website
- Anthony Cauchi – webmaster

Tour book

- Kate Stretton – designer
- Alan Hill – printing

Creative input

- Tim Crompton
- Phil Harvey
- Kate Weigert
- Jake Weigert
- Danny McNamara
- Al Martin
- a.b.a. Martin

Aircraft

- Lilp Rami – captain
- Pasi Koho – first officer
- Liisa Marsala – flight attendant

Others

- Karen Parker – Oxfam representative
- Phil Leech – GLD dressing room
- Steve Strange, Nicki Forestiero – Europe/World agents
- Marty Diamond, Larry Webman – US agents
- Lester Dales, Paul Makin – accounting
- Gavin Maude, Chris Organ – legal
- Shelley Lazaar, Sue Finn – ticketing
- Parlophone – record label
- Caroline Elleray, Ian Ramage – BMG Music Publishing

== See also ==
- List of Coldplay live performances
- List of highest-grossing live music artists

== Notes ==
Cities

Others
