= In My Place =

2002 single by Coldplay

Single by Coldplay

from the album A Rush of Blood to the Head
- B-side: "One I Love"; "I Bloom Blaum"
- Released: 5 August 2002
- Genre: Alternative rock; pop rock
- Length: 3:48
- Label: Parlophone; Capitol
- Songwriters: Guy Berryman; Jonny Buckland; Will Champion; Chris Martin
- Producers: Ken Nelson; Coldplay

Coldplay singles chronology
"Don't Panic" (2001)	"In My Place" (2002)	"The Scientist" (2002)

Music video
- "In My Place" on YouTube

"In My Place" is a song by British rock band Coldplay. The song was written collaboratively by all the band members and released on their second album, A Rush of Blood to the Head. The track is built around thumping drums and chiming guitars. It was released on 5 August 2002 as the lead single from A Rush of Blood to the Head and reached number two on the UK Singles Chart. The song also reached number 17 on Billboard's Modern Rock Tracks.

"In My Place" was well received by critics, who complimented its arrangement and profound lyrics. The song won the award for Best Rock Performance by a Duo or Group with Vocal at the 45th Annual Grammy Awards.

== Background and composition ==
"In My Place"
"In My Place" builds around three-note guitar lines and thumping drums.

In an interview with Q magazine, lead singer Chris Martin stated that "In My Place" was a song Coldplay had left after recording their debut album Parachutes (2000). When the band finished recording their second album A Rush of Blood to the Head, Martin said that the album was complete. However, after guitarist Jonny Buckland played the song on his guitar, Martin said that they now needed to record it and include it on the album. Martin also said that: "That's about where you're put in the world, and how you're given your position, and the way you look, and how you have to get on with it". In an interview, Buckland revealed that the song was hard to record, as the band had played the song live. He also commented that when they started recording the song, they did not know how it should sound, due to the band members' contrasting ideas.

The song opens with a single crash cymbal followed by two bars of 4/4 drumming, then a plaintive three-note guitar line rings through a strummy rhythm, and Martin's vocals. Its instrumentation is varied with the sound of thumping drums, chiming guitars, a singalong chorus, and a string arrangement. The song also features guitar licks. The lyrics emphasise: "But I wait for you/if you go, if you go/leave me down here on my own/then I'll wait for you." The song's lyrics also include references to a desire for weary optimism.

The song is written in the key of A major. It has been noted that the song's drum intro bears a close resemblance to the beginning of the Ride song "Dreams Burn Down".

== Release ==
Coldplay released "In My Place" on 5 August 2002 as the lead single for A Rush of Blood to the Head. It was pressed with two B-sides: "One I Love" and "I Bloom Blaum". The cover artwork features Buckland, with art directed by Sølve Sundsbø.

== Music video ==
The music video for "In My Place" was directed by Sophie Muller. It debuted on 17 June 2002 on AOL. It features the band playing in a huge, nearly empty, white studio room, with a bluish light resembling sunlight coming from an off-screen source. The video starts off with a closeup of Will Champion playing the drums as the song begins; while the rest of the band plays, Chris Martin, who is sitting in a corner, gets up and joins them in the song. Throughout the video, Martin sings directly to the camera, interspersed with shots of the other members of the band playing their instruments. During the guitar solo, Martin runs up to two women who are seen sitting on a step in the background, talks to them for a while, and then runs back to sing the rest of the song. The two women in the background were members of the video crew: a makeup artist/wardrobe assistant and the video commissioner.

The video was subjected to a spoof by Bad Lip Reading on their YouTube page. It was dubbed with the song "Yeti" that was composed and recorded, like BLR's other videos, to humorously reinterpret the lip movement and action in the video. "Yeti" has received over three million views on YouTube as of April 2017.

== Commercial performance ==
"In My Place" peaked at number two on UK Singles Chart on 17 August 2002, kept off the top by "Colourblind" by Darius Danesh. The song later re-entered the UK Top 40 in July 2011. In the United States, the song debuted on Billboard's Adult Alternative Airplay chart on 20 July 2002, before reaching number one on 28 September, marking the band's first number-one hit on any Billboard chart.

== Critical reception ==
=== Reviews ===
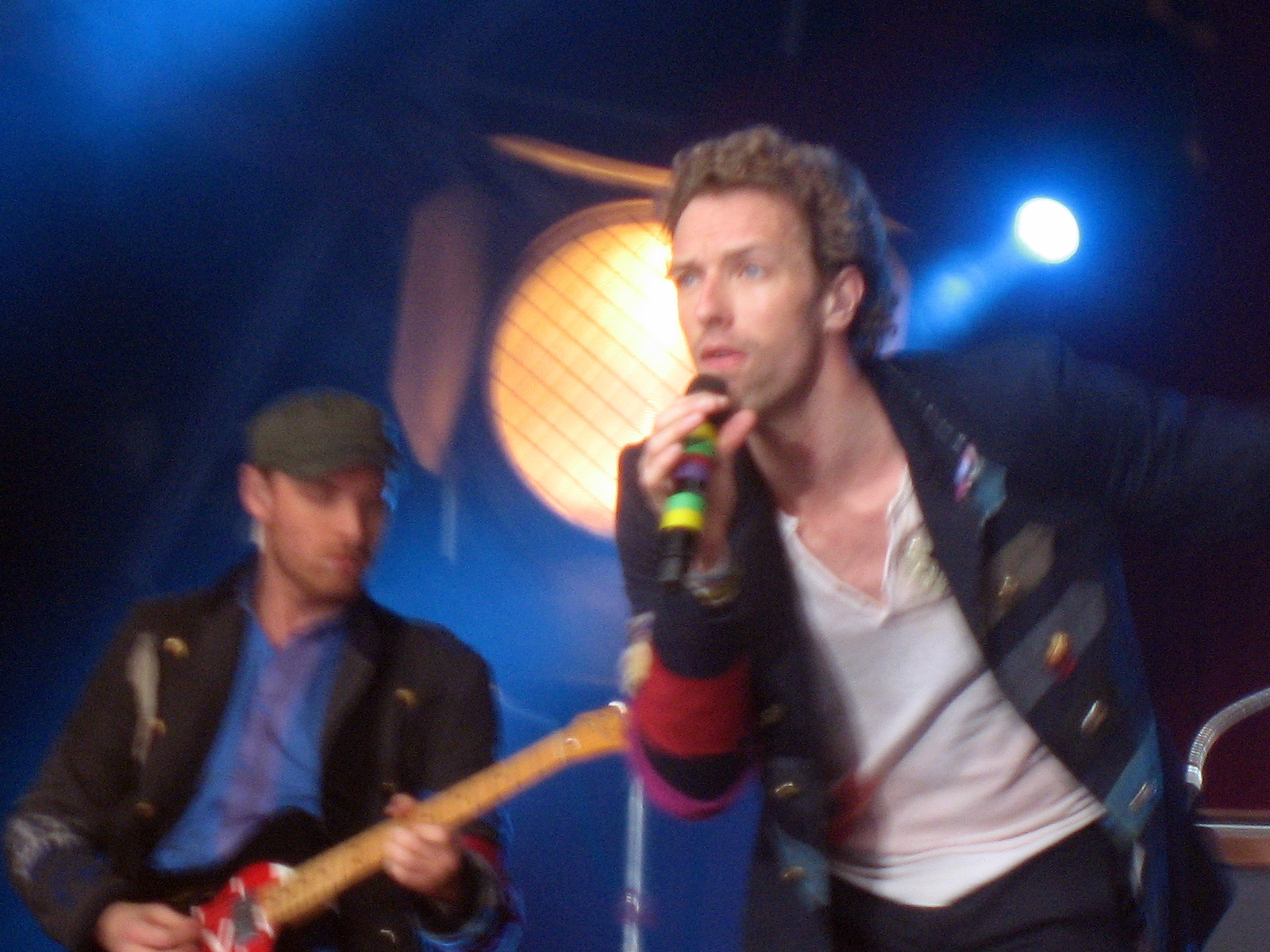
Coldplay performing "In My Place" on the Viva la Vida Tour in 2008

Critics were positive towards the song. In the Entertainment Weekly review of the album, critic David Browne wrote: "Songs like 'In My Place' and 'Warning Sign' marry lyrics imbued with deep regret and mistakes ('You were an island / And I passed you by' in the touching latter song) with lyrical melodies and guitar hooks that twinkle and sparkle". Adrien Begrand of PopMatters wrote: "When the shimmering, pretty lead-off single 'In My Place' represents the album's weakest moment, you know you've got something extraordinary. [...] 'In My Place' is another surprisingly simple song, carried by Jonny Buckland's chiming guitar and Chris Martin’s heartfelt vocals. It really shouldn't amount to much, but Coldplay make it work very well". Amy M. Bruce of The Towerlight wrote that "With a slew of introspective rock songs like 'In My Place' and 'God Put a Smile upon Your Face,' this album is worthy of the hype surrounding the band's first album". Jules Willis of the BBC said that "It's a fantastic pop tune that justifies Coldplay's status as one of UK's most exciting bands".

=== Rankings ===
List of critic rankings
Publication	Year	Description	Result	Ref.
The A.V. Club	2002	Songs of the Year 2002	14	
NME	2016	Best Tracks of 2002	43	
Radio X	2010	The Xfm Top 1000 Songs of All Time	Placed	
Radio X	2026	Best of British 500	489	
The Village Voice	2003	Pazz & Jop Critics Poll	15	

== Accolades ==
"In My Place" won a Grammy Award in the category of Best Rock Performance by a Duo or Group with Vocal at the 2003 Grammy Awards. The song was nominated for two 2003 MuchMusic Video Awards for Best international Video–Group and People's Choice: Favorite International Group.

== Usage in media ==
In 2003, "In My Place" was featured on Coldplay's live album, Live 2003. In 2012, "In My Place" was featured on Coldplay's live album Live 2012. The song appeared in the 2006 season 4 episode "Saving Sammy" on CBS' television series Cold Case. The song was used as a closing montage song about a case from 2003. The track appeared again on the 2002 episode "Girls Own Juice" of the television series Fastlane. The song is also featured as playable in the 2009 video game Guitar Hero 5.

== Track listing ==
All versions of the official single included the B-side, "One I Love". This track was performed on the subsequent A Rush of Blood to the Head Tour and is featured on Live 2003.

No.	Title	Length
1.	"In My Place"	3:48
2.	"One I Love"	4:35
3.	"I Bloom Blaum"	2:11

== Personnel ==
Coldplay

- Chris Martin – lead vocals, organ, string arrangements
- Jonny Buckland – electric guitars, string arrangements
- Guy Berryman – bass guitar, string arrangements
- Will Champion – drums, percussion, backing vocals, string arrangements

Additional Personnel

- Audrey Riley — string arrangement, string performer
- Ann Lines – string performer
- Chris Tombling – string performer
- Dan Green – string performer
- Laura Melhewish – string performer
- Leo Payne – string performer
- Peter Lale – string performer
- Richard George – string performer
- Susan Dench – string performer

== Charts ==
=== Weekly charts ===
Weekly chart performance in the 2000s
Chart (2002)	Peak position
Australia (ARIA)	23
Belgium (Ultratip Bubbling Under Flanders)	15
Belgium (Ultratip Bubbling Under Wallonia)	14
Canada (Nielsen SoundScan)	2
Denmark (Tracklisten)	16
Europe (European Hot 100 Singles)	8
Finland (Suomen virallinen lista)	19
France (SNEP)	60
Germany (GfK)	65
Ireland (IRMA)	2
Italy (FIMI)	4
Netherlands (Dutch Top 40 Tipparade)	3
Netherlands (Single Top 100)	43
New Zealand (Recorded Music NZ)	24
Norway (VG-lista)	17
Portugal (AFP)	3
Scottish Singles Sales (Official Charts)	2
Spain (Promusicae)	12
Sweden (Sverigetopplistan)	46
Switzerland (Schweizer Hitparade)	37
UK Singles (Official Charts)	2
US Bubbling Under Hot 100 (Billboard)	17
US Adult Alternative Airplay (Billboard)	1
US Adult Pop Airplay (Billboard)	22
US Alternative Airplay (Billboard)	17

Weekly chart performance in the 2010s
Chart (2011–2017)	Peak position
South Korea International (Gaon)	50
UK Singles (Official Charts)	40

Weekly chart performance in the 2020s
Chart (2023)	Peak position
Portugal (AFP)	128

=== Year-end charts ===
Year-end chart performance
Chart (2002)	Position
Canada (Nielsen SoundScan)	19
Canada Radio (Nielsen BDS)	55
Ireland (IRMA)	62
Italy (FIMI)	42
UK Singles (OCC)	103
UK Airplay (Music Week)	14
US Adult Top 40 (Billboard)	61
US Modern Rock Tracks (Billboard)	65
US Triple-A (Billboard)	10

== Certifications and sales ==
Certifications and sales
Region	Certification	Certified units/sales
France	—	10,701 (Note: French decade-end sales for "In My Place" in the 2000s.)
Italy (FIMI) Sales since 2009	Gold	35,000^{‡}
Portugal (AFP)	Gold	20,000^{‡}
New Zealand (RMNZ)	Platinum	30,000^{‡}
Spain (Promusicae)	Gold	30,000^{‡}
United Kingdom (BPI)	Platinum	600,000^{‡}
^{‡} Sales+streaming figures based on certification alone.

== Release history ==
Release dates and formats
Region	Date	Format(s)	Label(s)	Ref(s).
United States	1 July 2002	Hot adult contemporary; alternative; triple A radio	Capitol	
Australia	5 August 2002	CD	Parlophone	
United Kingdom	5 August 2002	12-inch vinyl; CD; cassette	Parlophone	
United States	7 October 2002	Contemporary hit radio	Capitol	

== See also ==
- List of UK top-ten singles in 2002
- List of Billboard number-one adult alternative singles of the 2000s

== Bibliography ==
- Roach, Martin (2003). Coldplay: Nobody Said It Was Easy. Omnibus. ISBN 0-7119-9810-8.
