= Live 2003 (Coldplay album) =

2003 live album by Coldplay

Live album by Coldplay
- Released: 4 November 2003 (US); 10 November 2003 (UK)
- Recorded: 21–22 July 2003
- Venues: Hordern Pavilion, Sydney
- Genres: Alternative rock; pop rock
- Length: 1:07:21 (CD); 1:31:47 (DVD)
- Labels: Parlophone; Capitol
- Directors: John Durrant; Russell Thomas
- Producers: Dan Green; Paul Hicks; Melanie Vaughton; Lee Lodge; Sarah Layish-Melamed

Coldplay chronology
A Rush of Blood to the Head (2002)	Live 2003 (2003)	X&Y (2005)

Professional ratings
Review scores
Source	Rating
AllMusic	3.5/5 stars
Entertainment Weekly	B
NME	9/10
Pitchfork	6.0/10
Record Collector	4/5 stars
Rolling Stone	2.5/5 stars

Live 2003 is the first live album by the British rock band Coldplay, featuring shows recorded at Sydney's Hordern Pavilion on 21 and 22 July 2003. It was released on 4 November 2003 by Capitol in the United States and on 10 November 2003 by Parlophone in the United Kingdom. Screenings were held at select theaters the day prior. The album marks the group's second live project after Trouble – Norwegian Live EP (2001).

The album was nominated for Best Long Form Music Video at the 47th Annual Grammy Awards, and named one of the greatest releases of the year by Blender. The song "Moses", exclusive to the album, was written about Chris Martin's then-wife Gwyneth Paltrow and inspired the name of their second child, born in 2006. It was sent to alternative radio stations in the United States as a promotional single on 6 October, while the recording of "Clocks" had a promotional push in countries such as Mexico and Spain.

== Commercial performance ==
Live 2003 debuted at number 13 on the US Billboard 200, with 71,224 copies sold. It entered the UK Music Video Chart at number 2 upon release. However, the set only reached the UK Albums Chart five years later, at number 73. Coldplay rose to number 60 and peaked at number 46 with 5,164 copies sold afterwards, boosted by Viva la Vida or Death and All His Friends (2008).

== Track listing ==
All tracks are written by Guy Berryman, Jonny Buckland, Will Champion and Chris Martin.

=== Disc one (DVD) ===
1. "Politik" (from A Rush of Blood to the Head, 2002)
2. "God Put a Smile upon Your Face" (from A Rush of Blood to the Head)
3. "A Rush of Blood to the Head" (from A Rush of Blood to the Head)
4. "Daylight" (from A Rush of Blood to the Head)
5. "Trouble" (from Parachutes, 2000)
6. "One I Love" (from "In My Place" single, 2002)
7. "Don't Panic" (from Parachutes)
8. "Shiver" (from Parachutes)
9. "See You Soon" (from The Blue Room EP, 1999)
10. "Everything's Not Lost" (from Parachutes)
11. "Moses" (previously unreleased)
12. "Yellow" (from Parachutes) (additional guitar by Matt McGinn)
13. "The Scientist" (from A Rush of Blood to the Head)
14. "Clocks" (from A Rush of Blood to the Head)
15. "In My Place" (from A Rush of Blood to the Head)
16. "Amsterdam" (from A Rush of Blood to the Head)
17. "Life Is for Living" (from Parachutes)
18. "Tour Diary Documentary" (Extra) 40:00

=== Disc two (CD) ===
No.	Title	Original Album	Length
1.	"Politik"	A Rush of Blood to the Head	6:36
2.	"God Put a Smile upon Your Face"	A Rush of Blood to the Head	4:56
3.	"A Rush of Blood to the Head"	A Rush of Blood to the Head	6:50
4.	"One I Love"	"In My Place" single	5:08
5.	"See You Soon"	The Blue Room	3:29
6.	"Shiver"	Parachutes	5:25
7.	"Everything's Not Lost"	Parachutes	8:47
8.	"Moses"	N/A	5:29
9.	"Yellow"	Parachutes	5:36
10.	"Clocks"	A Rush of Blood to the Head	5:32
11.	"In My Place"	A Rush of Blood to the Head	4:13
12.	"Amsterdam"	A Rush of Blood to the Head	5:20
Total length:			1:07:21

== Personnel ==
- Chris Martin – lead vocals, piano, acoustic guitar, rhythm guitar
- Jonny Buckland – lead guitar, backing vocals, harmonica (on "Don't Panic")
- Guy Berryman – bass guitar
- Will Champion – drums, backing vocals
- Matt McGinn – additional guitar on "Yellow" and "The Scientist"

== Charts ==
=== Weekly charts ===
Weekly chart performance
Chart (2003–2008)	Peak position
Australian Albums (ARIA)	16
Austrian Music DVDs (Ö3 Austria)	2
Belgian Albums (Ultratop Flanders)	35
Belgian Albums (Ultratop Wallonia)	46
Belgian Music DVDs (Ultratop Flanders)	8
Canadian Albums (Billboard)	10
Czech Music DVDs (ČNS IFPI)	10
Dutch Music DVDs (MegaCharts)	1
French Albums (SNEP)	26
German Albums (Offizielle Top 100)	34
Irish Music DVDs (IRMA)	2
Italian Music DVDs (FIMI)	1
Japanese DVD Sales (Oricon)	124
New Zealand Albums (RMNZ)	26
Norwegian Albums (VG-lista)	24
UK Albums (Official Charts)	46
UK Music Videos (Official Charts)	2
US Billboard 200	13
US Music Video Sales (Billboard)	1

=== Monthly charts ===
Monthly chart performance
Chart (2007)	Peak position
Argentine Music DVDs (CAPIF)	13

=== Year-end charts ===
Year-end chart performance
Chart (2003)	Position
Argentine Music DVDs (CAPIF)	8
Dutch Music DVDs (MegaCharts)	24
Irish Music DVDs (IRMA)	8
UK Music Videos (Music Week)	6
US Music Video Sales (Billboard)	10

Chart (2004)	Position
Argentine Music DVDs (CAPIF)	5
Belgian Music DVDs (Ultratop Flanders)	21
UK Music Videos (Music Week)	27
US Billboard 200	193
US Music Video Sales (Billboard)	3

Chart (2005)	Position
Argentine Music DVDs (CAPIF)	6
Belgian Music DVDs (Ultratop Flanders)	34
Dutch Music DVDs (MegaCharts)	13
UK Music Videos (Music Week)	27

Chart (2006)	Position
Argentine Music DVDs (CAPIF)	11

Chart (2008)	Position
Italian Music DVDs (FIMI)	16

Chart (2009)	Position
Swedish Music DVDs (Sverigetopplistan)	73

Chart (2011)	Position
Italian Music DVDs (FIMI)	19

== Certifications and sales ==
Certifications and sales
Region	Certification	Certified units/sales
Album
Australia (ARIA)	Gold	35,000^{^}
Iceland	—	2,000 (Note: Icelandic total sales for Live 2003 as of July 2005.)
Japan	—	2,453 (Note: Japanese physical sales for Live 2003 as of December 2003.)
New Zealand (RMNZ)	Gold	7,500^{^}
United States (RIAA)	Gold	698,000 (Note: American total album sales for Live 2003 as of May 2008.)
Video
Argentina (CAPIF)	Platinum	8,000^{^}
Australia (ARIA)	8× Platinum	120,000^{^}
Austria (IFPI Austria)	Gold	5,000^{*}
Canada (Music Canada)	8× Platinum	80,000^{^}
France (SNEP)	3× Platinum	60,000^{*}
Germany (BVMI)	2× Platinum	100,000^{^}
Mexico (AMPROFON)	Gold	10,000^{^}
Portugal (AFP)	Platinum	8,000^{^}
United Kingdom (BPI)	2× Platinum	100,000^{^}
United States (RIAA)	6× Platinum	600,000^{^}
^{*} Sales figures based on certification alone.^{^} Shipments figures based on certification alone.
