= Moses (Coldplay song) =

Promotional single by Coldplay

from the album Live 2003
- Released: 6 October 2003
- Recorded: 21 July 2003
- Genre: Alternative rock
- Length: 5:29
- Label: Parlophone; Capitol
- Songwriters: Guy Berryman; Jonny Buckland; Will Champion; Chris Martin
- Producers: Coldplay; Ken Nelson

"Moses" is a song by British rock band Coldplay. It was written by all members of the band for their live album, Live 2003, and released on 6 October 2003 as a promotional single.

== Background ==
The song was written about lead singer Chris Martin's then wife, Gwyneth Paltrow. He said that it is "about falling in love with the most beautiful woman in the world." The title later served as the namesake for the couple's second child, Moses Bruce Anthony Martin.

== Personnel ==
- Chris Martin – vocals, rhythm guitar
- Jonny Buckland – lead guitar
- Guy Berryman – bass guitar
- Will Champion – drums

== Track listing ==
CD single
No.	Title	Length
1.	"Moses" (Live in Sydney)	5:29

== Chart performance ==
Weekly chart performance
Chart (2003)	Peak position
US Adult Alternative Airplay (Billboard)	10
US Adult Pop Airplay (Billboard)	38
US Alternative Airplay (Billboard)	24

== Release history ==
Release date and formats
Country	Date	Format	Label	Ref.
United States	6 October 2003	Modern rock radio	Parlophone	
