= God Put a Smile upon Your Face =

2003 single by Coldplay

Single by Coldplay

from the album A Rush of Blood to the Head
- B-side: "Murder"
- Released: 1 July 2003
- Genre: Alternative rock; folk rock; indie rock
- Length: 4:58
- Label: Parlophone; Capitol
- Songwriters: Guy Berryman; Jonny Buckland; Will Champion; Chris Martin
- Producers: Ken Nelson; Coldplay

Coldplay singles chronology
"Clocks" (2003)	"God Put a Smile upon Your Face" (2003)	"Speed of Sound" (2005)

Music video
- "God Put a Smile upon Your Face" on YouTube

"God Put a Smile upon Your Face" is a song by British rock band Coldplay. It was written by all members of the band for their second studio album, A Rush of Blood to the Head (2002). The song is built around prominent acoustic and electric guitar riffs with accompanying up-tempo drumming. The song was released on 1 July 2003 as the fourth and final single from the album.

Regional singles were released for Canada, Europe, Australia, and an enhanced version for Taiwan. Promo singles were released for the United Kingdom and United States. Since only promo copies were released, the single itself reached only number 100 in the UK Singles Chart.

== Background ==
Coldplay vocalist Chris Martin said, about the writing of the song, "That came out of playing live and wanting to have something with a bit more bounce. We were really getting into things like PJ Harvey and Muse – things with a bit more energy".

When asked about the development of the song, during a track-by-track reveal, bassist Guy Berryman said:

When we came to record it in the studio we struggled because there was something just not quite right about it and I wasn't happy about where we'd left it and where we were happy to leave it and we couldn't put our finger on what it was and so it was a really nice day one day, me and Chris were just trying, I was actually just trying to record bass at the time and me and Chris were just sitting down trying to brainstorm it and work out what was wrong and so I started trying to just do a few different bass lines and stuff. Between the two of us we came up with just this kind of groove, which stays on the same note as opposed to change, it's quite technical but it kind of added a bit of bounce to the song and it made it roll along in a much more fluid way. It was a bit mechanical before and it's just interesting how something small like that can really change the whole vibe of a song. It was just nice because from there on it was one of our favourite tracks and it almost didn't get on the record but it's now one of our favourite tracks.

== Composition ==
God Put a Smile upon Your Face
Sample of "God Put a Smile upon Your Face" from Coldplay's 2002 album A Rush of Blood to the Head.

The song features an acoustic and electric guitar sound. The song starts with a hushed acoustic ballad before building into a roar of an electric guitar and soaring with vocals. The song also includes an uptempo metronomic drumming rhythm.

The first line of the chorus alludes to a definitive moment with the cryptic reference to God: "Now when you work it out, I'm worse than you/Yeah, when you work it out I wanted to/Now, when you work out where to draw the line/Your guess is as good as mine." Greg Kot of the Chicago Tribune commented that the lyric "God gave you style and gave you grace," Martin sings as if "cataloguing the attributes he only wishes he had". Performing the song live in 2005, guitarist Jonny Buckland played "ripping off some Edge-worthy guitar riffs while Martin strummed away on acoustic guitar, giving the song a country-ish jangle".

== Release ==
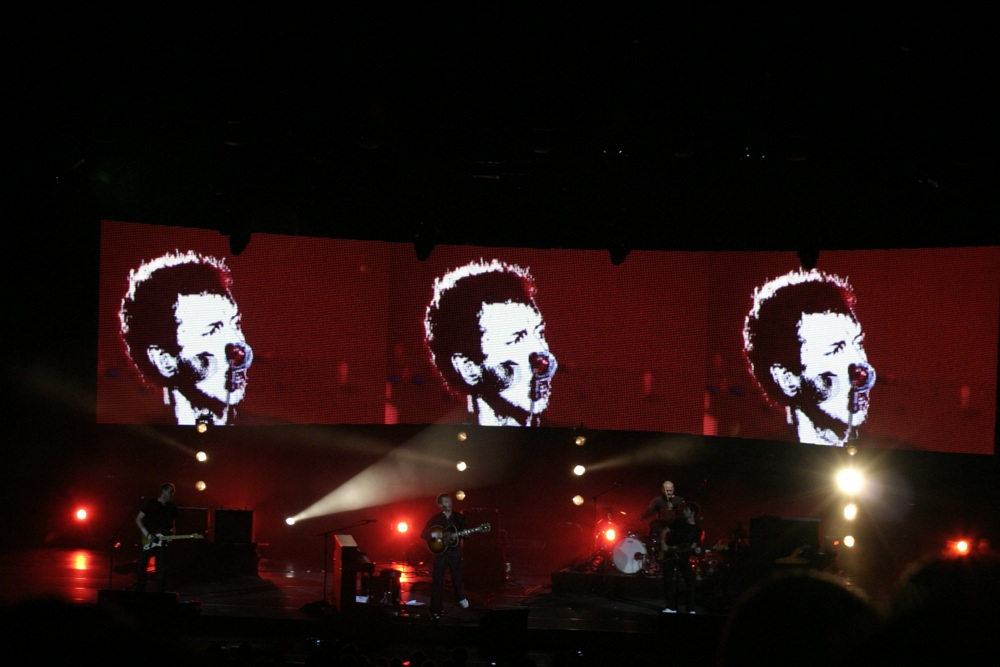
Coldplay performing "God Put a Smile upon Your Face" during their 2005 Twisted Logic Tour

Coldplay first released "God Put a Smile upon Your Face" in Belgium and the Netherlands on 1 July 2003, followed by a European release on 7 July 2003. The song was later released in Australia on 21 July 2003, and it was added to US triple A and alternative radio on 8 September 2003. When the song was released, it featured the B-side "Murder". The single cover features bassist Guy Berryman, art-directed by Sølve Sundsbø. Regional singles were released for Europe and Australia.

== Reception ==
Critics were positive towards the song. In the Rolling Stone review of the album, critic Rob Sheffield wrote: "'God Put a Smile Upon Your Face' is the slinkiest and best thing Coldplay have ever done." Adrien Begrand of PopMatters wrote: "Buckland's lead fills highlight the wondrous 'God Put a Smile on Your Face', as the song's chorus reaches heights that rival those of their fellow countrymen Doves." Ted Kessler of NME wrote: "Over a pounding garage tattoo Martin poses a deep, mortality-based teaser ('where do we go from here?'), asserts some self-belief ('God gave me style, God gave me grace') and then hits upon the bottom line as the song's mood suddenly improves with another fat and glorious chorus: 'Yeah, when you work it out I'm the same as you....your guess is as good as mine'".

"God Put a Smile upon Your Face" was featured in the band's first live album, Live 2003. The song is available on Guitar Hero III: Legends of Rock. The game also includes other Coldplay songs such as "Yellow" and "Violet Hill". The American TV series Alias used it in the second-season episode "Double Agent", which aired on 2 February 2003. Plan B sampled the track on his 2007 mixtape Paint it Blacker. The song was also covered by Mark Ronson on his album Version, which he performed live with Adele at the 2008 Brit Awards. In 2010, "God Put a Smile upon Your Face" was included in The Xfm Top 1000 Songs of All Time book.

== Music video ==
The music video, released in October 2003, is shot in black-and-white and has a narrative theme, with clips of the band interspersed. It was directed by Jamie Thraves, who had previously directed the band's third video for "The Scientist".

The video intercuts footage of the band performing the song with the story of a businessman (played by actor Paddy Considine), who is walking when he bumps into a mysterious suited but barefoot stranger. As the businessman continues walking, he drops his briefcase, and when he attempts to pick it up, he is shocked when his hand goes through the handle, turning invisible. Using his other hand to pick up the briefcase, he walks into a restaurant to have a meal with his colleagues and sits looking uneasy while they enjoy themselves. During the meal, the businessman takes a drink from a glass of water and watches in disbelief as this hand disappears as well. The glass of water shatters on the floor, much to the amusement of his colleagues. Humiliated, the businessman quickly goes to the bathroom, looks in the mirror, and is horrified to see both his hands had disappeared. Placing the spaces where his hands were in his pockets, he rushes out of the restaurant leaving his briefcase behind, as his colleagues call after him. The businessman keeps running until he eventually collapses onto a mattress in an alleyway. The businessman writhes in horror as the rest of him disappears, leaving only his empty suit.

== Track listing ==
CD single
No.	Title	Length
1.	"God Put a Smile upon Your Face"	4:58
2.	"Murder"	5:35

Australian CD single
No.	Title	Length
1.	"God Put a Smile upon Your Face"	4:58
2.	"Murder"	5:36
3.	"Politik" (live)	6:44
4.	"Lips Like Sugar" (live)	4:52

== Personnel ==
- Chris Martin – lead vocals, acoustic guitar
- Jonny Buckland – lead electric guitar
- Guy Berryman – bass guitar
- Will Champion – drums

== Charts ==
Weekly chart performance
Chart (2003)	Peak position
Australia (ARIA)	43
Italy (FIMI)	46
Netherlands (Dutch Top 40)	38
Netherlands (Single Top 100)	65
New Zealand (Recorded Music NZ)	35
UK Singles (Official Charts)	100
UK Rock & Metal (Official Charts)	12
US Adult Alternative Airplay (Billboard)	15

== Certifications ==
Certifications
Region	Certification	Certified units/sales
United Kingdom (BPI)	Silver	200,000^{‡}
^{‡} Sales+streaming figures based on certification alone.

== Release history ==
Release dates and formats
Region	Date	Format(s)	Label(s)	Ref.
Belgium	1 July 2003	CD	Parlophone	
Netherlands	1 July 2003	CD	Parlophone	
Europe	7 July 2003	CD	Parlophone	
Germany	14 July 2003	CD	Parlophone	
Australia	21 July 2003	CD	Parlophone	
United States	8 September 2003	Triple A; alternative radio	Capitol	

== Notable cover versions ==
An instrumental pop soul cover by English musician, DJ and producer Mark Ronson was released as promotional vinyl single in January 2007, featuring the Daptone Horns, as a double A-side with a cover of Britney Spears' "Toxic" featuring Ol' Dirty Bastard and Tiggers, in promotion of Ronson's 2007 studio album of cover versions, Version, of which both covers appear on. Ronson and The Daptone Horns' version was a minor hit, peaking at Number 63 on the UK singles chart in April 2007. Ronson performed the song during his set at the 2008 Brit Awards with Adele on vocals (having co-produced her debut album 19 and later her 2015 album 25).
