= Politik (song) =

2002 song by Coldplay

Song by Coldplay

from the album A Rush of Blood to the Head
- Written: 11 September 2001
- Released: 26 August 2002
- Recorded: 13 September 2001
- Genre: Alternative rock
- Length: 5:18
- Label: Parlophone
- Songwriters: Guy Berryman; Jonny Buckland; Will Champion; Chris Martin
- Producers: Ken Nelson; Coldplay

"Politik" is a song by British rock band Coldplay and the opening track of their second studio album, A Rush of Blood to the Head (2002). It is heavier and more guitar-driven than the songs on the band's debut album, Parachutes (2000).

== Composition and recording ==
Lead singer Chris Martin wrote "Politik" on 11 September 2001 in response to that day's terrorist attacks, and the band recorded it two days later. Martin said the band wanted "a song where we just hit our instruments as loudly as possible and dispensed with the idea of fragility".

The song opens with drums, guitar and bass playing at full volume before Martin's vocal enters. Ted Kessler of NME wrote that the guitars and keyboards "mash together in a two note blur" before dropping out to leave Martin alone at the piano. PopMatters compared the song's bridge to Pink Floyd's Wish You Were Here.

Parlophone A&R representative Miles Leonard said that opening the album with a song as challenging as "Politik" was "a statement of intent".

== Critical reception ==
NME compared the album's opening to that of Radiohead's The Bends, which begins with "Planet Telex", and wrote that "Politik" was "several evolutionary steps ahead" of the band's earlier single "Yellow". In The Guardian, Alexis Petridis wrote that the song's "clanging guitars" gave the band a potency that most observers had not expected of them. AllMusic wrote that songs such as "Politik" broadened the band's range and showed that they could "really rock". In 2003, Q included the song in its list of the 1001 Best Songs Ever.

In 2020, NME ranked "Politik" eighth of Coldplay's 142 songs, calling it a "pounding, forceful announcement" that the band had moved on from Parachutes. Clash included it in a 2025 list of the band's 15 best songs, calling it "crushingly effective" as an album opener and the point at which Coldplay moved past comparisons to Radiohead.

The Recording Academy later included "Politik" in its list of ten songs that captured America's feelings after the September 11 attacks.

== Live performances ==
"Politik" opened all 151 shows of the A Rush of Blood to the Head Tour (2002–2003). Bassist Guy Berryman said there was "no better song than this one to open our show".

On 23 February 2003, Coldplay performed "Politik" with the New York Philharmonic at the 45th Annual Grammy Awards at Madison Square Garden in New York City. The orchestra was conducted by David Robertson, and the arrangement was by Michael Kamen. It was the band's first performance at the Grammys. Drummer Will Champion said that, with the ceremony in New York and possibility of war approaching, it was "the only appropriate song to play".

== Personnel ==
Credits adapted from the A Rush of Blood to the Head liner notes.

Coldplay

- Chris Martin – lead vocals, piano
- Jonny Buckland – lead guitar, backing vocals
- Guy Berryman – bass guitar
- Will Champion – drums, backing vocals

Production

- Ken Nelson – producer
- Coldplay – co-production
