= The Scientist (song) =

2002 single by Coldplay

Single by Coldplay

from the album A Rush of Blood to the Head
- B-side: "1.36"; "I Ran Away"
- Released: 11 November 2002
- Genre: Rock
- Length: 5:09 (album version); 4:26 (radio edit)
- Label: Parlophone; Capitol
- Songwriters: Chris Martin; Jonny Buckland; Guy Berryman; Will Champion
- Producers: Ken Nelson; Coldplay

Coldplay singles chronology
"In My Place" (2002)	"The Scientist" (2002)	"Clocks" (2003)

Music video
- "The Scientist" on YouTube

"The Scientist" is a song by British rock band Coldplay. The song is credited to all the band members on their second album, A Rush of Blood to the Head. It is built around a piano ballad, with lyrics telling the story about a man's desire to love and an apology. The song was released in the United Kingdom on 11 November 2002 as the second single from A Rush of Blood to the Head and reached number 10 in the UK Charts. It was released in the United States on 15 April 2003 as the third single and reached number 18 on the US Billboard Modern Rock Tracks chart and number 34 on the Adult Top 40 chart.

Critics were highly positive toward "The Scientist" and praised the song's piano riff and Chris Martin's falsetto. Several remixes of the track exist, and its riff has been widely sampled. The single's music video won three MTV Video Music Awards, for the video's use of reverse narrative. The song was also featured on the band's 2003 live album Live 2003 and has been a permanent fixture in the band's live set lists since 2002.

== Background ==
Lead singer Chris Martin wrote "The Scientist" after listening to George Harrison's All Things Must Pass. In an interview with Rolling Stone, Martin revealed that while working on the band's second album, A Rush of Blood to the Head, he knew that the album was missing something. One night, during a stay in Liverpool, Martin found an old piano that was out of tune. He wanted to work on Harrison's song, "Isn't It a Pity", but he could not manage to do so. When the song came to Martin, he asked that the recorder be turned on. He concluded by saying that he came across this chord sequence and noted that the chord was "lovely". Martin recorded the vocals and piano takes in a studio in Liverpool.

When asked about the development of the song, during a track-by-track reveal, Martin said: "That's just about girls. It's weird that whatever else is on your mind, whether it's the downfall of global economics or terrible environmental troubles, the thing that always gets you most is when you fancy someone". The liner notes from A Rush of Blood to the Head, on the other hand, state that "The Scientist is Dan", a reference to Dan Keeling, the A&R man who signed the band to Parlophone.

== Composition ==
"The Scientist" excerpt
From the album A Rush of Blood to the Head. This sample includes a portion of chorus, as well as an allusion to the title.

"The Scientist" is a melancholic, piano-driven ballad. The lyrics to the song allude to a man's powerlessness in the face of love. It begins with the main four-chord piano melody created by lead singer Chris Martin, then joined by the first verses. He is then accompanied by the rest of the band after the first chorus. In addition to the main piano melody, the music of the song is created by a string arrangement.

== Release ==
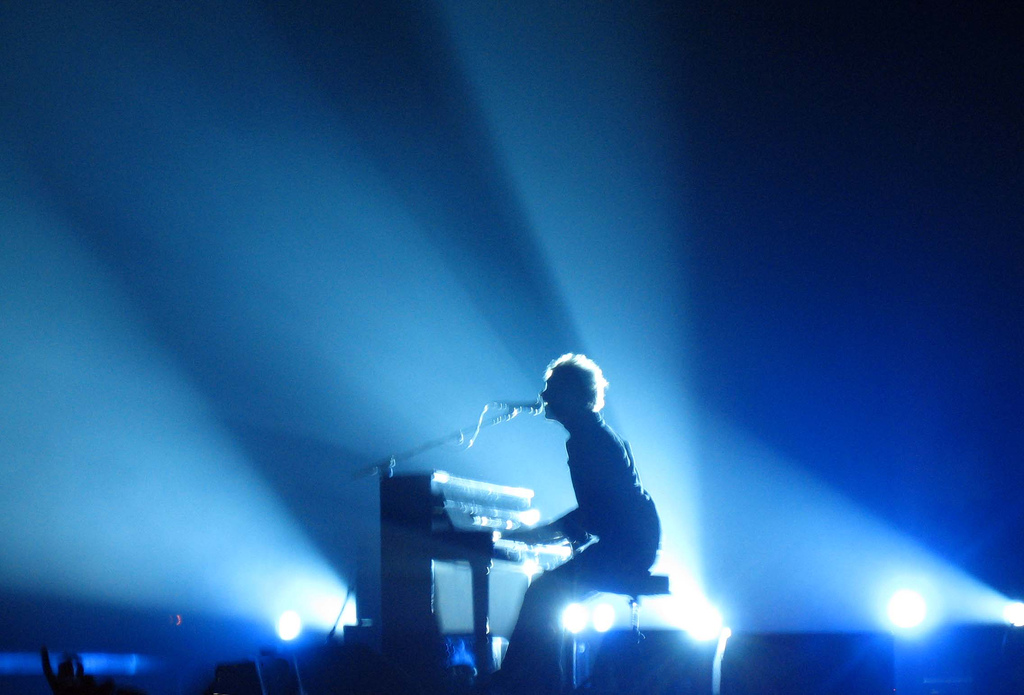
Chris Martin playing "The Scientist" on his piano during the band's 2005 Twisted Logic Tour

Coldplay released "The Scientist" in the United Kingdom on 11 November 2002 as the album's second single. The single was pressed with two B-sides: "1.36" and "I Ran Away." While preparing for the song as the album's second release, the band's US label felt the song failed to "provide enough of a blood rush for American listeners"; instead, they released "Clocks" as the second single in the US. The song was released on 15 April 2003 in the US.

"The Scientist" was released as a CD single in New Zealand on 9 December 2002, while in Australia, the song was not released until 27 October 2003. The song appeared on Australian Singles Chart at number 40 on 1 November 2003. It appeared on Billboard's Modern Rock Tracks at number 18. The song peaked at number sixteen at Canada Singles Chart. The song peaked at number 10 in UK Top 75 on 17 November 2002.

The single's cover image was created by Norwegian photographer Sølve Sundsbø. Sundsbø originally created the image that would later be used as the cover art of A Rush of Blood to the Head for the fashion magazine Dazed and Confused, in the late 1990s. As with the album's other singles, "The Scientist"'s cover art features a black and white 3D scan of one of the band members, in this case drummer Will Champion.

== Other versions ==
"The Scientist" has been featured on two of Coldplay's live albums, Live 2003 (2003) and Live in Buenos Aires (2018). The song was covered live by Aimee Mann and released on a special edition of her album Lost in Space. Natasha Bedingfield and Avril Lavigne covered the song on Jo Whiley's Live Lounge radio show. Also, Belinda Carlisle did a live rendition on the ITV1 reality show Hit Me Baby One More Time. The British female quartet All Angels did a choral arrangement of the song on their second album Into Paradise, which was released in 2007. In addition, the American television show MADtv did a parody of the video, called "The Narcissist." Coldplay's original version plus a cover of the track performed by Johnette Napolitano and Danny Lohner were featured in the 2004 film Wicker Park. Allison Iraheta and Kris Allen performed an acoustic duet of the song at Oprah Winfrey's "No Phone Zone" rally in Los Angeles.

In 2011, Willie Nelson covered the song for a Chipotle Mexican Grill short film titled Back to the Start, highlighting the problems of concentrated animal feeding operations. It also appears as the final track on his 2012 album Heroes. Nelson's version plays during the closing credits of the 2014 film The Judge. The song was used on 23 May 2011 episode of WWE Raw in a tribute video to wrestler "Macho Man" Randy Savage who had died three days earlier. The song was performed in the Glee episode "The Break Up" on 4 October 2012 by Cory Monteith, Darren Criss, Naya Rivera, Matthew Morrison, Lea Michele, Chris Colfer, Heather Morris and Jayma Mays. In 2014, Miley Cyrus covered the song at selected stops of her Bangerz Tour. Corinne Bailey Rae covered "The Scientist" for the soundtrack to the 2017 film Fifty Shades Darker. The bluegrass group The Petersens covered the song in 2020. In 2021 Zucchero Fornaciari covered the song for his first cover album Discover. Rachel Chinouriri covered the song in 2024 for the Spotify Singles series.

== Music video ==
The music video for "The Scientist" was notable for its distinctive reverse narrative, which employed reverse motion. The same concept had been previously used for Spike Jonze's 1995 music video for The Pharcyde's "Drop". The reverse-motion style had first been seen in 1989 for the video for the song "The Second Summer of Love" by Scottish band Danny Wilson. In order for Martin to appear to be singing the lyrics in the reversed footage, he had to learn to sing the song backward, which took him a month. The video was filmed at various locations, including London and at Bourne Woods in Surrey, before the first leg of the A Rush of Blood to the Head tour. It was directed by Jamie Thraves. The video was shot between 30 September and 3 October 2002, premiering on 14 October.

In the music video, lead singer Chris Martin stands as a cyclist rides past him in reverse. Martin learned to sing the song backwards to create the video's unique visual effect.

The video opens on Martin lying on a mattress before a public building covered in thick graffiti. Martin is shown, in reverse motion, wandering through a variety of locations such as through a pick-up basketball game, a high street and train tracks before falling on the mattress. After the second chorus, Martin is shown getting out of his right hand drive BMW 5 Series automobile with a Wyoming license plate in the woods and an unconscious woman (played by Irish actress Elaine Cassidy) is shown, and it is revealed that Martin and the woman were involved in a car accident; the passenger went flying through the windshield because she was not wearing her seatbelt.

In 2003, "The Scientist" won multiple MTV Video Music Awards for Best Group Video, Best Direction, and Breakthrough Video. It was also nominated at the 2004 Grammy Awards for Best Short Form Music Video but lost to Johnny Cash's video for "Hurt".

On the 20th anniversary of A Rush of Blood to the Head, the band released a new version of the video in 4K resolution, which was restored and re-graded from the original 35 mm film.

== Critical reception ==
=== Reviews ===
"The Scientist" received widespread critical acclaim. Rob Sheffield of Rolling Stone, in his review of the album, wrote: "The fantastic piano ballad 'The Scientist' ... [has] a cataclysmic falsetto finale that could raise every hair on the back of your neck". Nick Southall of Stylus wrote: "The piano that chimes through 'The Scientist' is captured perfectly, the warm depression of each individual key caught rather than a shrill ringing as is so often the case". Ian Watson of NME wrote: "'The Scientist' is a song inexorably linked with the endless night sky and the secret hopes and regrets of a hundred thousand strangers". In October 2011, NME placed it at number 37 on its list "150 Best Tracks of the Past 15 Years". In 2009, Rolling Stone ranked it number 54 on its "100 Best Songs of the Decade" list. In 2018, the same magazine placed the track at number 50 on their "100 Greatest Songs of the Century" list. In 2019, Billboard ranked the song number five on their list of the 50 greatest Coldplay songs, and in 2021, American Songwriter ranked the song number six on their list of the 10 greatest Coldplay songs.

=== Rankings ===
List of critic rankings
Publication	Year	Description	Result	Ref.
Billboard	2023	The 100 Greatest Songs of 2003	47	
Billboard	2023	The 100 Best Pop Songs Never to Hit the Hot 100	61	
Blender	2005	Top 500 Songs of the 1980s–2000s	55	
Consequence	2009	The Top 50 Songs of the 2000s	36	
Entertainment Weekly	2019	The Best Music Videos That Tell Tales	Placed	
The Guardian	2009	1000 Songs Everyone Must Hear	Placed	
KROQ-FM	2024	Top 500 Songs from the Last 30 Years	427	
NME	2011	150 Best Tracks of the Past 15 Years	37	
NME	2014	The 500 Greatest Songs of All Time	448	
NPO Radio 2	2013	Top 2000	29	
Panorama	2023	The 100 Most Beautiful Songs of All Time	Placed	
Parade	2023	102 Best Music Videos of All Time	69	
Q	2004	50 Greatest British Tracks	20	
Q	2006	100 Greatest Songs of All Time	81	
Radio X	2010	The Xfm Top 1000 Songs of All Time	Placed	
Radio X	2023	The Best Music Videos of the 2000s	1	
Radio X	2026	Best of British 500	138	
Rolling Stone	2011	100 Best Songs of the 2000s	54	
Rolling Stone	2025	The 250 Greatest Songs of the 21st Century So Far	141	(Note: The song first appeared at number 50 on the listicle, dropping in subsequent editions.)
The Telegraph	2018	The 100 Greatest Songs of All Time	65	
The Telegraph	2026	The 30 Best Songs of the 2000s	2	

== Track listing ==
CD
No.	Title	Length
1.	"The Scientist"	5:11
2.	"1.36"	2:05
3.	"I Ran Away"	4:26

- "1.36" features Tim Wheeler of Ash on guitar.

DVD
No.	Title	Length
1.	"The Scientist" (edit)
2.	"The Scientist" (video running backward)
3.	"Lips Like Sugar" (live, Echo & the Bunnymen–Cover)
4.	"Interview with band members"

== Personnel ==
Coldplay

- Chris Martin – lead vocals, lead guitar, piano, string arrangements
- Jonny Buckland – electric guitar, acoustic guitar, string arrangements
- Guy Berryman – bass guitar, string arrangements
- Will Champion – drums, percussion, backing vocals, string arrangements

Additional personnel

- Audrey Riley – string arrangement, string performer
- Ann Lines – string performer
- Chris Tombling – string performer
- Dan Green – string performer
- Laura Melhewish – string performer
- Leo Payne – string performer
- Peter Lale – string performer
- Richard George – string performer
- Susan Dench – string performer

== Charts ==
=== Weekly charts ===
Weekly chart performance in the 2000s
Chart (2002–2003)	Peak position
Australia (ARIA)	40
Austria (Ö3 Austria Top 40)	8
Belgium (Ultratip Bubbling Under Flanders)	6
Belgium (Ultratip Bubbling Under Wallonia)	10
Canada (Nielsen SoundScan)	16
Europe (European Hot 100 Singles)	34
Germany (GfK)	26
Hungary (Single Top 40)	18
Ireland (IRMA)	15
Italy (FIMI)	23
Netherlands (Dutch Top 40 Tipparade)	4
Netherlands (Single Top 100)	20
Scottish Singles Sales (Official Charts)	10
Switzerland (Schweizer Hitparade)	28
UK Singles (Official Charts)	10
US Adult Alternative Airplay (Billboard)	5
US Adult Pop Airplay (Billboard)	34
US Alternative Airplay (Billboard)	18

Weekly chart performance in the 2010s
Chart (2010–2017)	Peak position
France (SNEP)	31
South Korea International (Gaon)	16
Sweden (Sverigetopplistan)	56
UK Singles (Official Charts)	54
US Digital Song Sales (Billboard)	56
US Hot Rock & Alternative Songs (Billboard)	21

Weekly chart performance in the 2020s
Chart (2022–2025)	Peak position
Argentina Hot 100 (Billboard)	63
Finland (Suomen virallinen lista)	15
Global 200 (Billboard)	109
Greece International (IFPI)	21
Hong Kong (Billboard)	15
Ireland (IRMA)	5
Malaysia (Billboard)	22
Malaysia International (RIM)	18
Netherlands (Single Top 100)	75
Philippines (Philippines Hot 100)	91
Portugal (AFP)	22
Singapore (RIAS)	4
United Arab Emirates (IFPI)	12

=== Monthly charts ===
Monthly chart performance
Chart (2017)	Peak position
South Korea International (Gaon)	38

=== Year-end charts ===
Year-end chart performance
Chart (2002)	Position
Canada (Nielsen SoundScan)	84

Chart (2017)	Position
Brazil (Pro-Música Brasil)	199

Chart (2018)	Position
Portugal Streaming (AFP)	200

Chart (2022)	Position
Portugal (AFP)	172

Chart (2025)	Position
Belgium (Ultratop 50 Flanders)	173
Global 200 (Billboard)	132
UK Singles (OCC)	95

== Certifications ==
Certifications
Region	Certification	Certified units/sales
Australia (ARIA)	6× Platinum	420,000^{‡}
Denmark (IFPI Danmark)	2× Platinum	180,000^{‡}
Germany (BVMI)	Platinum	600,000^{‡}
Italy (FIMI) Sales since 2009	3× Platinum	150,000^{‡}
New Zealand (RMNZ)	6× Platinum	180,000^{‡}
Portugal (AFP)	5× Platinum	50,000^{‡}
Spain (Promusicae)	3× Platinum	180,000^{‡}
United Kingdom (BPI)	5× Platinum	3,000,000^{‡}
United States (RIAA)	4× Platinum	4,000,000^{‡}
Streaming
Denmark (IFPI Danmark)	Gold	1,300,000^{†}
^{‡} Sales+streaming figures based on certification alone.^{†} Streaming-only figures based on certification alone.

== See also ==
- List of UK top-ten singles in 2002
- List of top 10 singles in 2024 (Ireland)
