= Martin Terefe =

Swedish record producer (born 1969)

- Born: Martin Terefe; 18 April 1969 (age 57); Stockholm, Sweden
- Occupations: Record producer, audio engineer, musician, songwriter
- Years active: 1984–present
- Website: www.martinterefe.com

Martin Terefe (born 18 April 1969, Stockholm, Sweden) is a Swedish record producer and songwriter, now living and working in London, who has produced Grammy, Brit and Juno award -winning albums with artists like Jason Mraz, James Morrison and KT Tunstall. He is also a member of the group Apparatjik.

== Biography ==
Terefe spent his early years in Caracas in Venezuela, where he learned to play the guitar, before moving back to Stockholm in 1979. At the age of 15 he was signed up to a publishing deal and briefly fronted a rock band, but soon realised that he preferred a role writing and producing for other people. He travelled to the UK and the US, where he met Michael Dixon, the manager of singer-songwriter Ron Sexsmith, and who later became Terefe's manager.

Terefe's early productions in Stockholm were for Swedish artists Sara Isaksson, Ardis and André de Lange. In 1996 Terefe moved to London and set up his own recording studio, Kensaltown Studios, named after Kensal Town, the district of west London where the studios are located. He produced several of Sexsmith's albums during the 2000s and has gone on to write and produce songs and albums by KT Tunstall, a-ha, Jason Mraz, James Morrison, Martha Wainwright, Train, Cat Stevens, Mary J. Blige, Jamie Cullum, Alyssa Bernal, Beverley Knight and Westlife. Terefe's productions won two awards at the 2010 Grammy Awards as a producer, for "Make It Mine" by Jason Mraz (Best Male Pop Vocal Performance) and "Lucky" by Jason Mraz and Colbie Caillat (Best Pop Collaboration With Vocals).

In 2008 Terefe and Dixon set up Kensaltown Records. The label's releases included Ron Sexsmith's album Exit Strategy of the Soul, the debut album by American singer Dawn Kinnard, and the charity album Songs for Survival. The Songs for Survival album included the first song by Apparatjik, the supergroup of a-ha's Magne Furuholmen, Coldplay's Guy Berryman, Mew's Jonas Bjerre and Terefe. The group continued to work together, releasing their debut album in 2010 and the follow-up in 2012.

In 2009 Martin Terefe was ranked as the Number 10 most successful music producer of hit songs on the Billboard Hot 100 singles chart.

Terefe and songwriter Sacha Skarbek (who is also managed by Michael Dixon) wrote the UK's entry for the 2012 Eurovision Song Contest, titled "Love Will Set You Free" and sung by Engelbert Humperdinck.

In December 2020, Terefe and Bruce Lampcov assembled a band of British jazz musicians to play on the Bitches Brew-inspired, self-titled album London Brew, which is set for release on 31 March 2023 by Concord Jazz.

== Discography ==
Selected production, mixing, recording credits

- 1994: Sara Isaksson – Red Eden (producer, songwriter)
- 1994: Sara Isaksson – May (producer) (single)
- 1995: Les Héroïnes original soundtrack (producer)
- 1996: Ardis – Woman (producer, songwriter)
- 1997: Terefe/Whitecross – Terefe/Whitecross (producer, songwriter)
- 1997: Andre de Lang – Worth the Wait (songwriter)
- 1998: Michael Ruff with straitjacket – Feels Good (songwriter)
- 1998: Secret Service – Flash in the night / Oh Susie (The Antiloop Reconstruction) (remixer) (single)
- 1999: The Bisons – EP (remixer)
- 1999: Andre de Lang – Educate your soul (producer, songwriter)
- 1999: Message in a bottle original soundtrack (producer)
- 1999: Glen Scott – Without Vertigo (producer, songwriter)
- 2000: Joanna de Seyne – Picture This (producer, songwriter, mixer)
- 2000: Glen Scott – The deafening silence (producer)
- 2000: Amy Giles – Other (producer)
- 2000: Michael Ruff – Lovesongs + Lullabies (producer, songwriter, mixer)
- 2000: Ana Egge – 101 Sundays (producer)
- 2001: Shea Seger – The May Street Project (producer, songwriter, mixer)
- 2001: Rosalie Deighton – Truth Drug (songwriter)
- 2001: This is where I belong – The songs of Ray Darius + the kinks
- 2001: Glen Scott – Soul Rider (producer)
- 2001: Steve Balsamo – Sugar for the soul (producer, songwriter)
- 2001: Leona Naess – I Tried to Rock You But You Only Roll (producer)
- 2001: The Bisons – Compactor (producer)
- 2002: Ron Sexsmith – Cobblestone Runway (producer)
- 2002: Elisa – Come Speak To Me (producer, remixer) (single)
- 2003: Clarksville – The Half Chapter (producer, songwriter)
- 2003: Beautiful: A Tribute to Gordon Lightfoot (performer with Ron Sexsmith on Drifters, producer)
- 2003: Staireo – Staireo (producer)
- 2003: Eloise Laws – Secrets (co-wrote Leave The Light On and Listen to the Moonlight with Michael Ruff)
- 2003: Ron Sexsmith – Rarities (producer)
- 2004: KT Tunstall – Black and White (producer, songwriter, mixer) (single)
- 2004: Juliet Turner – Season of the Hurricane (producer, songwriter)
- 2004: Alex Cuba Band – Humo De Tabaco (producer, mixer)
- 2004: Brinkman – Where The Years Go (producer)
- 2004: Ron Sexsmith and Various Artists – For the kids too – (producer, mixer) (single)
- 2004: KT Tunstall – False Alarm EP (songwriter)
- 2004: Kim Richey – The Collection (producer, mixer)
- 2004: Ron Sexsmith – Retriever (producer)
- 2004: Jason Mraz – (Live) Tonight Not Again (songwriter)
- 2004: Beautiful Dreamer – The songs of Stephen Foster compilation album (producer, mixer)
- 2004: Magne F – Past Perfect Future Tense (producer, mixer)
- 2004: KT Tunstall – Eye to the Telescope (co-wrote Other Side of the World and Through The Dark, producer)
- 2005: Jaci Velasquez – Beauty Has Grace (producer)
- 2005: Jason Mraz feat. Alex Cuba Band – Dramatica Mujer (The Target Red Room Vol. 4) – (producer, songwriter)
- 2005: Cat Stevens – Gold (produced the track Indian Ocean)
- 2005: KT Tunstall – Other Side of the World (producer, songwriter) (single)
- 2005: a-ha – Analogue (co-wrote and produced Celice)
- 2006: Teitur – Stay under the stars (producer)
- 2006: Declan O'Rourke – Since Kyabram (producer)
- 2006: Gareth Gates – Pictures of the Other Side (co-wrote Changes, Lost in You, 19 Minutes, Can't Believe It's Over, Afterglow, Angel on My Shoulder, producer)
- 2006: Cyril Paulus – Un Autre Nom (producer, songwriter)
- 2006: James Morrison – Undiscovered (producer, songwriter)
- 2007: Ben's Brother – Beta Male Fairytales (producer, songwriter)
- 2007: Mutya Buena – Real Girl (producer) (single)
- 2007: Jamie Scott – Park Bench Theories (producer, songwriter)
- 2007: Craig David – Trust Me (producer, songwriter)
- 2007: KT Tunstall – Drastic Fantastic (songwriter Funnyman)
- 2007: Umi no Shanghai (The Longest Night in Shanghai soundtrack) (songwriter and performer with Guy Berryman and Magne Furuholmen on Bass Theme and Guy Romance Theme)
- 2008: Martha Wainwright – I Know You're Married But I've Got Feelings Too (producer)
- 2008: Ron Sexsmith – Exit Strategy of the Soul (producer)
- 2008: Corneille – The Birth of Corneillius (producer, songwriter)
- 2008: James Morrison – Songs for You, Truths for Me (co-wrote, produced and played on The Only Night, Once When I Was Little)
- 2008: Bruce Parry Presents: Amazon Tribe – Songs for Survival compilation (producer, songwriter)
- 2008: Jason Mraz – "I'm Yours" (producer) (single)
- 2008: Jason Mraz – We Sing. We Dance. We Steal Things. (producer, songwriter)
- 2009: Yusuf – Roadsinger (produced five of the tracks, including the first single Thinking 'Bout You)
- 2009: Train – Save Me, San Francisco (producer)
- 2009: Howie Day – Sound the Alarm (producer, songwriter)
- 2009: a-ha – "Foot of the Mountain" (songwriter) (single)
- 2009: Gin – Holy Smoke (producer)
- 2009: Waylon – Wicked Ways (producer, songwriter)
- 2009: Westlife – Where We Are (producer)
- 2009: Terefe / Whitecross – From here to Helsinki (artist)
- 2009: Jamie Cullum – The Pursuit (producer)
- 2010: Apparatjik – We Are Here (producer, artist)
- 2010: a-ha – Butterfly, Butterfly (producer) (single)
- 2010: KT Tunstall – Tiger Suit (co-wrote Lost and Come On, Get In)
- 2010: Joshua Radin – The Rock and The Tide (producer, songwriter)
- 2010: Alyssa Bennal – Alyssa Bennal EP (producer, songwriter)
- 2010: Eric Gadd – Rise Up! (producer, songwriter)
- 2010: Jason Mraz – Life is Good (songwriter) (single)
- 2010: Train – "Hey, Soul Sister" (producer)(single). The song reached number three on the Billboard Hot 100 and sold over five million digital copies in the US
- 2010: Charlotte Church – Back to Scratch (producer)
- 2011: Beverley Knight – Soul UK (produced most of the album)
- 2011: Apparatjik – Combat Disco Music (artist, producer) (single)
- 2011: Emma's Imagination – Stand Still (producer)
- 2011: Greyson Chance – Hold On 'Til the Night (co-wrote Little London Girl, producer)
- 2011: Mamas Gun – The life and Soul (producer)
- 2011: Mads Langer – Behold (producer)
- 2011: Brett Dennen – Loverboy (producer)
- 2011: James Morrison – The Awakening (co-wrote the song All Around The World)
- 2011: Jesse & Joy – ¿Con Quién Se Queda El Perro? (producer, songwriter)
- 2011: Alyssa Bernal – Love Hangover (co-wrote the song Soaking Up The Sun with James Morrison)
- 2011: Javier Colon – Come Through For You (co-wrote the song Stand Up with Pharrell and produced The Truth)
- 2011: Mary J. Blige – This Live II (Act 1) (produced the song Need Someone)
- 2011: Luca Dirisio – Compis (A Pretty Fucking Good Album) (producer)
- 2012: Apparatjik – Square Peg in a Round Hole (artist, producer)
- 2012: Engelbert Humperdinck – Love Will Set You Free (co-wrote with Sacha Skarbek this song for the Eurovision Song Contest 2012) (single)
- 2012: Jason Mraz – Love Is a Four Letter Word (co-wrote Everything is Sound)
- 2012: Casey Abrams – Casey Abrams (writer, performer, backing vocals, producer)
- 2012: Delta Goodrem I Lost All Love 4 U (Child Of the Universe) (Writer, Editor, Producer)
- 2013: Martin Halla – Winter Days (co-wrote the songs Illuminate The Sky, Ignited, The River, He's The One, All The Red Lights, producer)
- 2013: Backstreet Boys – In a World Like This (producer, songwriter)
- 2013: Miguel Bosé – Papitwo (producer)
- 2013: James Blunt- Moon landing (producer)
- 2013: Shane Filan – You and Me (producer)
- 2013: KT Tunstall – Feel It All single (Mixing / Additional production)
- 2013: Jesse & Joy – Corazon De Campeon – single for world cup 2014 (producer)
- 2013: Zaz – Recto Verso (songwriter, producer)
- 2013: Marius Beck – Majors & Minors EP (producer)
- 2014: Ricardo Arjona – Viaje (producer)
- 2014: Luis Fonsi – 8 (producer)
- 2014: Engelbert Humperdinck – Engelbert Calling (producer)
- 2014: Amaia Montero – Si Dios Quiere Yo Tambien (producer)
- 2014: Lowell – We Loved Her Dearly (producer, songwriter, engineering, mixing)
- 2014: Tini – Undo My Heart (songwriter, producer)
- 2015: MisterWives – "Our Own House" (songwriter)
- 2015: Shawn Mendes – Handwritten (producer, songwriter)
- 2015: MIKA – No Place in Heaven (producer)
- 2015: James Morrison – Higher Than Here (producer, songwriter)
- 2015: Mike Posner – The Truth (EP) (producer)
- 2015: Concha Buika – Vivir Sin Miedo (producer)
- 2015: a-ha – Cast in Steel (songwriter)
- 2015: Mike Posner – "I Took a Pill in Ibiza" (producer)
- 2015: Jesse & Joy – Un Besito Más (producer, songwriter)
- 2015: Zaz – Sur La Route (producer)
- 2016: Josh Flowers & The Wild – Let The Dirt Live (producer, songwriter)
- 2016: Mike Posner – At Night, Alone. (producer, songwriter)
- 2016: Christina Aguilera – "Change" (producer)
- 2016: Ward Thomas – Cartwheels (producer, songwriter)
- 2016: Abel Pintos – 11 (producer)
- 2016: Fetsum – Light In A Dark Place (producer, songwriter)
- 2017: James Blunt – The Afterlove (producer)
- 2017: Theory of a Deadman – Wake Up Call (producer)
- 2017: a-ha – Take On Me (Acoustic) (producer)
- 2017: Coldplay feat. Big Sean – "Miracles (Someone Special)" (additional production)
- 2017: Robin Schulz feat. James Blunt – "OK" (additional production)
- 2017: Dan Caplen – Blinded By The Lights (additional production)
- 2017: Anoushka Lucas – Dark Soul (songwriter, producer)
- 2017: Josh Flowers – Car You Drive (producer)
- 2018: Yungblud – 21st Century Liability (producer and additional songwriting)
- 2018: Amaia Montero – Nacidos para Creer (producer)
- 2018: KT Tunstall – WAX (co-wrote The River, Dark Side of Me and Tiny Love)
- 2019: Alice Chater – Tonight
- 2019: Martin Terefe – Some Advice for the Kids (songwriter, performer)
- 2020: Theory of a Deadman – Say Nothing (producer)
- 2020: Martin Terefe – The Involuntary Gardener (album: songwriter, performer)
- 2021: Brynn Cartelli – Based on a True Story
- 2022: KT Tunstall – NUT (producer, co-wrote I Am the Pilot, Canyons and Brain in a Jar)
- 2023: Theory of a Deadman – Dinosaur (producer)
- 2023: Jason Mraz – Mystical Magical Rhythmical Radical Ride (producer, songwriter)
- 2026: Robbie Williams - Britpop (producer, co-wrote Spies and Selfish Disco)
