= Oliver Peoples =

American luxury eyewear brand owned by EssilorLuxottica

- Type: Subsidiary of Luxottica
- Founded: 1986
- Headquarters: Los Angeles, California, United States
- Number of locations: 42 retail stores
- Key people: Rocco Basilico (CEO)
- Products: Eyewear and Sunglasses
- Owner: Luxottica
- Parent: EssilorLuxottica
- Website: oliverpeoples.com

Oliver Peoples is an American luxury eyewear brand established in 1986, and owned by Luxottica. The brand is sold in Oliver Peoples boutiques, online, and in fashion boutiques and department stores throughout the world. Oliver Peoples eyewear is designed in Los Angeles, Italy, and Japan.

== History ==
Oliver Peoples was founded by Kenny Schwartz, Larry Leight and his brother Dennis Leight in 1986. Before they launched the company, Schwartz and Larry Leight worked as opticians. They would draw glasses on the celebrities in Vogue magazine. In 1984, Leight designed a frame, later named "Identity," that was fabricated for pop artist Andy Warhol. Warhol wore the glasses for an editorial spread published in the German magazine Männer Vogue in 1987.

In 1986, while Schwartz and the Leight brothers were searching for eyewear brands to stock their new boutique in West Hollywood, California, they purchased a bulk lot of American brand name frames in their original packaging for $5,000 at an auction in Connecticut. Contrary to popular belief and often advocated by Larry in the past for marketing purposes, the evocative brand name was not created accidentally while going through the inventory where a receipt was found naming the frames' original owner as Oliver Peoples, it was brainstormed by the founders including Cindy Leight starting as the abbreviation of OP, then as O Peoples and Oscar Peoples in referencing to the Oscars and finally settling on Oliver Peoples partially with inspiration from the novel Oliver Twist. Early manufacturing partnership was with the Japanese eyewear maker EYEVAN from the city of Sabae, Fukui.

In 2006, Oakley acquired Oliver Peoples for $46.7 million. In 2007, Oakley was purchased by eyewear giant Luxottica. In 2016, Rocco Basilico became the CEO of Oliver Peoples. After his first year at the helm, Basilico earned himself a place on the famed Forbes' '30 Under 30' list. To date, Basilico has helped increase Oliver Peoples' retail footprint from 14 to 42 global stores.

== In film, television and music ==
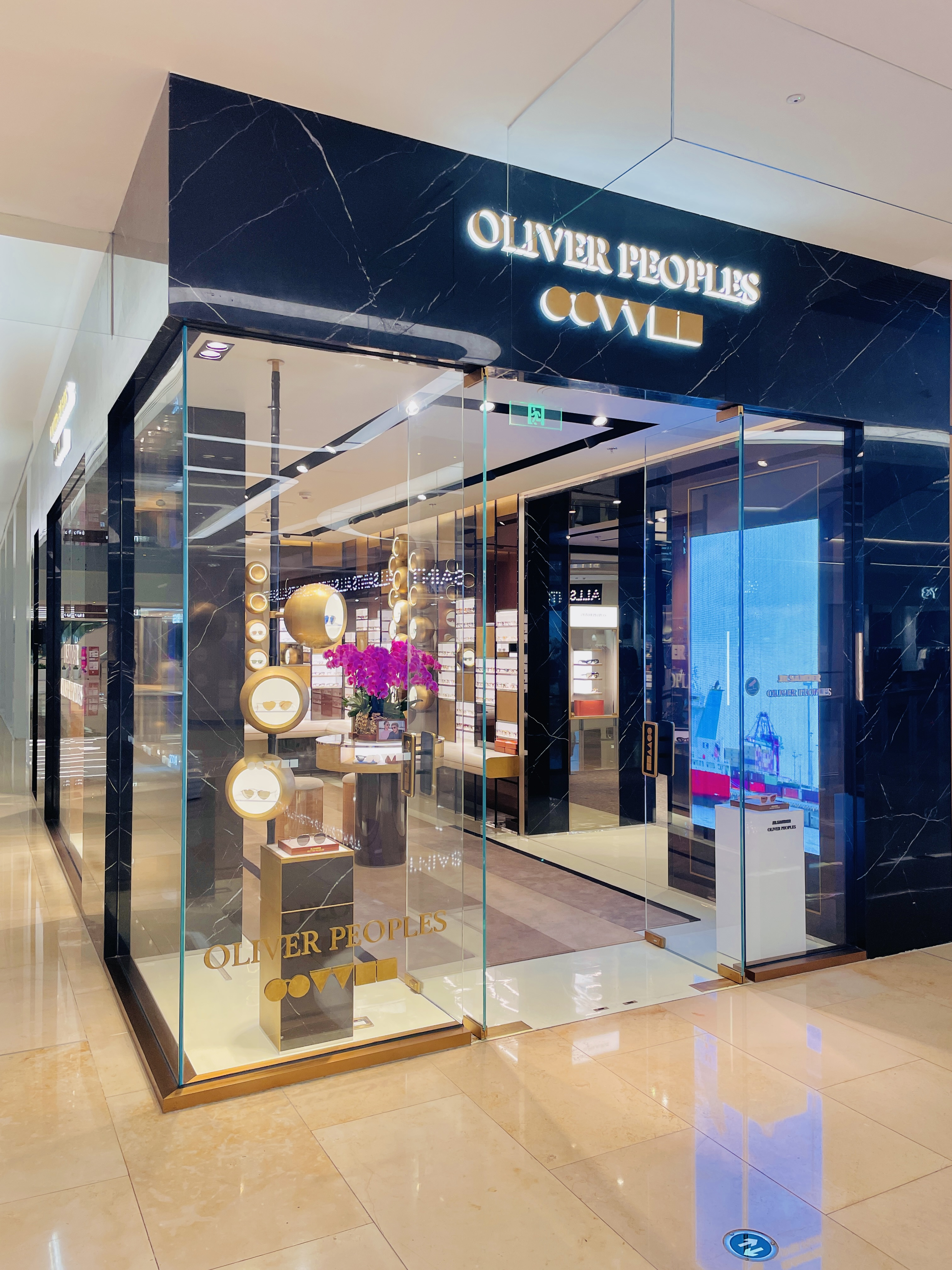
An Oliver Peoples Boutique located at the Kerry Centre in Jing'an, Shanghai taken in May 2026

1989, Denise Crosby wears OP-505 in “Pet Sematary".

1991, Oliver Peoples is mentioned in Bret Easton Ellis' novel, American Psycho. The film adaptation, released in 2000, features Christian Bale in the iconic Oliver Peoples 'O'Malley' frames. The same year, Julia Roberts wears 'M-4 Sun' frames in Dying Young.

1993, Whoopi Goldberg wears MP-2 in Sister Act 2: Back in the Habit. Also in 1993, Laura Dern wore Oliver Peoples glasses in Jurassic Park.

1994, Anthony Edwards wears Oliver Peoples (full rim frames, later rimless) throughout his entire tenure on ER.

1996, Jeff Goldblum wears Oliver Peoples Finley in “Independence Day”.

1997, Bruce Willis wears 'O'Malley Sun' in The Jackal.

1999, Brad Pitt wears Oliver Peoples' Aero II styles in Fight Club.

2004, Denzel Washington wears Oliver Peoples M4 in Man on Fire.

2005, Brad Pitt and Angelina Jolie wear Oliver Peoples in Mr. & Mrs. Smith.

2007, Nicolas Cage wears Oliver Peoples MP-2 in National Treasure, Book of Secrets.

2013, James Spader wears Oliver Peoples in the NBC series The Blacklist.

2014, Mark Wahlberg wears Oliver Peoples in the movie The Gambler.

2017, Bono from U2 wears Oliver Peoples 'Row After Midnight' frames.

2022, Kevin Costner wears Oliver Peoples in the television series, Yellowstone.

2022, Theo James and Aubrey Plaza wear Oliver Peoples in the HBO series The White Lotus.

2023, Jeremy Strong as Kendall Roy wears Oliver Peoples in the HBO series Succession.

== Collaborations ==
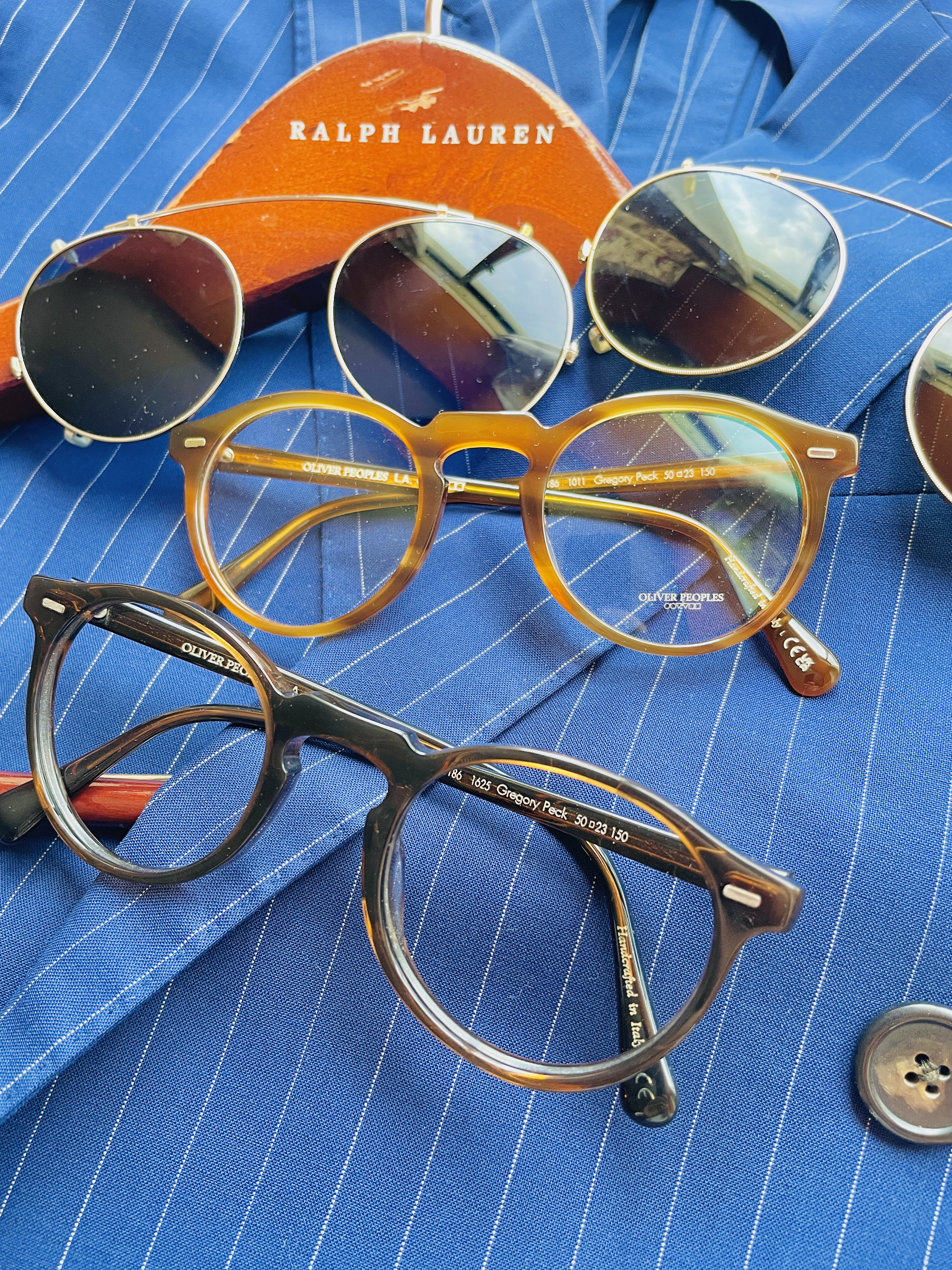
The Gregory Peck in both Espresso and Raintree, along with blue and polarized green clip ons.

In 1994, Oliver Peoples and Sir Elton John collaborated to create a series of frames with a portion of the proceeds going to the Elton John AIDS Foundation. This marked the first collaboration with the brand.

In 2009, Oliver Peoples collaborated with actress Zooey Deschanel for a signature pair of sunglasses called "Zooey."

In 2012, Oliver Peoples collaborated with Anthony Peck, who is a longtime customer and the estate of Gregory Peck and released the eponymous line of optical and sunglasses frames worn by the actor as Atticus Finch in the film To Kill a Mockingbird (film) for the 50th anniversary of the movie and foldable versions were also released in 2020, these frames often comes with a gold embossed card and a printed scene from the iconic film.

In 2013, Oliver Peoples collaborated with French women's brand Isabel Marant.

In 2015, Oliver Peoples collaborated with Rodarte Public School. and fragrance brand Byredo.

In 2016, Oliver Peoples collaborated with the luxury fashion label established by Mary-Kate and Ashley Olsen, The Row.

In 2019, Oliver Peoples collaborated with the Grant estate to launch the Cary Grant style inspired by Grant's character in the film "North by Northwest".

In 2020, Oliver Peoples collaborated with premium audio company Master & Dynamic.

In 2021, Oliver Peoples collaborated with Italian luxury brand Brunello Cucinelli, and fashion house, Frère.

In 2023, Oliver Peoples collaborated with New York womenswear brand Khaite.

== Boutiques ==
As of 2026, the Oliver Peoples brand has approximately 48 stand alone retail boutiques around the world in North America, Europe and Asia.

== See also ==
- Warby Parker
- Ray-Ban
