= Amazon (2008 TV series) =

- DVD cover
- Genre: Reality; Documentary
- Directed by: Matt Brandon
- Presented by: Bruce Parry
- Starring: Bruce Parry
- Theme music composer: Guy Berryman; Magne Furuholmen; Jonas Bjerre
- Composers: David Ayers, Felix Tod
- Country of origin: United Kingdom
- Original language: English
- No. of seasons: 1
- No. of episodes: 6

Production
- Executive producers: Adrian Davies, Richard Klein, Sam Organ
- Producers: Steve Robinson, Matt Brandon
- Production location: Amazon River
- Cinematography: Matt Norman; Zubin Sarosh (location audio)
- Editor: Gwynfor Llewellyn
- Running time: 45 minutes

Original release
- Network: BBC Two
- Release: 15 September – 20 October 2008

Related
- Tribe

Amazon (also known as Amazon with Bruce Parry) is a BBC documentary television series co-produced by Endeavour Productions and Indus Films, and hosted by Bruce Parry.

In the series, Parry—a former British Royal Marine—travels more than 6,000 km down the Amazon River by boat, light aircraft, and on foot. Over the course of six episodes, he meets and lives with indigenous peoples, coca farmers, loggers, and illegal miners.

The series was released on a two-disc DVD set on 3 November 2008. A book to accompany the series was also published.

== Episodes ==
No.	Title	Original release date
1	"Episode 1"	15 September 2008
2	"Episode 2"	22 September 2008
3	"Episode 3"	29 September 2008
4	"Episode 4"	6 October 2008
5	"Episode 5"	13 October 2008
6	"Episode 6"	20 October 2008

== Songs for Survival ==
Alongside the Amazon (and the previous series Tribe) series, a 2-CD album, Songs for Survival, was released by Kensaltown Records which features a variety of artists such as Mike Oldfield, Johnny Borrell, Hot Chip, The Go! Team, Mystery Jets, and Yusuf Islam. Every track on the album is exclusive, and was written especially for the project. The theme to Amazon is performed by Apparatjik, a supergroup composed of Guy Berryman, Magne Furuholmen, and Jonas Bjerre (of Coldplay, A-ha, and Mew respectively).
