= Loverboy (disambiguation) =

Loverboy is a Canadian rock band.

Loverboy or Lover Boy may also refer to:

== Film ==
- Lover Boy (1975 film), an Italian film by Marino Girolami
- Lover Boy (1985 film), an Indian Hindi film by Shomu Mukherjee
- Lover Boy (1989 film), an Australian film directed by Geoffrey Wright
- Loverboy (1989 film), an American comedy starring Patrick Dempsey
- Loverboy (2005 film), an American drama directed by Kevin Bacon
- Loverboy (2011 film), a Romanian drama

== Albums ==
- Loverboy (Brett Dennen album), 2011
- Loverboy (Loverboy album), 1980
- Lover Boy (album), a 2003 album by Ariel Pink

== Songs ==
- "Loverboy" (Billy Ocean song), 1984
- "Loverboy" (Mariah Carey song), 2001
- "Loverboy" (You Me at Six song), 2011
- "Lover Boy", a song by Mika from The Boy Who Knew Too Much
- "Lover Boy", a song by Scarlett Belle
- “Lover Boy”, a song by Phum Viphurit

== Other uses ==
- Loverboy, a clothing brand designed by Charles Jeffrey
- The "Loverboy method", a method of procuring prostitutes
- Loverboys, a 1996 story collection by Ana Castillo

== See also ==
- Certified Lover Boy, 2021 album by Drake
