= Tribe (British TV series) =

- Tribe DVD
- Also known as: Going Tribal
- Presented by: Bruce Parry
- Country of origin: United Kingdom
- Original language: English
- No. of series: 3
- No. of episodes: 15

Original release
- Network: BBC Two
- Release: 3 January 2005 – 25 September 2007

Related
- Amazon

Tribe (known as Going Tribal in the United States) is a British documentary television series co-produced by the BBC and the Discovery Channel, and hosted by former British Royal Marine Bruce Parry.

In each series, Parry visits a number of remote tribes in such locales as the Himalayas, Ethiopia, West Papua, Gabon, and Mongolia, spending a month living and interacting with each society. While there, Parry adopts the methods and practices of his hosts, participating in their rituals and exploring their cultural norms. This often enables him to form personal bonds with members of each tribe.

Parry tries to learn the basics of each tribe's language, though he is also accompanied by a translator.

The series is co-produced by BBC Wales and the Discovery Channel. A second series aired in July 2006 and the third began on 21 August 2007 on BBC Two, and ended on 25 September 2007. No further series have been made, though Parry's 2008 series, Amazon has a similar synopsis.

Parry was awarded the BAFTA Cymru "Best On-Screen Presenter" award in 2008 for his work on the 'Penan' episode. A BAFTA Cymru "Best Camera: Not Drama" award was also awarded for Gavin Searle's work in the same episode.

The show has also received criticism from scholars for not using scientific, anthropologic practices, and for appealing to stereotypes of exoticism for entertainment purposes.

== Episodes ==
=== Series 1 (2005) ===
No. overall	No. in season	Title	US title	Original release date	US air date
1	1	"Adi"	Lost Tribe: The Adis	3 January 2005	6 September 2005
Set in Northeast India. The episode involves the sacrifice of a bull.
2	2	"Suri"	Dangerous Game: The Suri	10 January 2005	9 August 2005
Set in Ethiopia.
3	3	"Kombai"	Living with Cannibals	17 January 2005	16 August 2005
Set in West Papua.
4	4	"Babongo"	African Vision Quest	24 January 2005	30 August 2005
Set in Gabon.
5	5	"Darhad"	Horse Masters of Mongolia	31 January 2005	23 August 2005
Set in Mongolia. Parry witnesses a shamanic ritual.
6	6	"Sanema"	Waking the Spirits	7 February 2005	13 September 2005
Set in Venezuela. Parry takes part in a ceremony involving an hallucinogenic drug.

=== Series 2 (2006) ===
All three episodes were in Ethiopia within the Southern Nations, Nationalities, and Peoples' Region

No. overall	No. in season	Title	US title	Original release date	US air date
7	1	"Nyangatom"	Return to Africa	2 May 2006	2 May 2006
Parry returns to Ethiopia to stay with the Nyangatom people, who are sworn enemies of the Suri, whom Parry had met in the previous series.
8	2	"Hamar"	Rites of Passage: The Hamar	9 May 2006	9 May 2006
Set in Ethiopia
9	3	"Dassanech"	Crocodile Hunting	16 May 2006	16 May 2006
Set in Ethiopia

=== Series 3 (2007) ===
No. overall	No. in season	Title	US title	Original release date	US air date
10	1	"Matis"	Hunting with the Jaguar Tribe	21 August 2007	10 August 2007
Set in Brazil
11	2	"Nenets"	Nomads of the Siberian Tundra	28 August 2007	17 August 2007
Set in Russia
12	3	"Anuta"	Lost Island of Anuta	4 September 2007	24 August 2007
Set in the Solomon Islands
13	4	"Akie"	Life in the African Bush: The Akie	11 September 2007	31 August 2007
Set in Tanzania
14	5	"Layap"	Journey to the Clouds: Bhutan	18 September 2007	7 September 2007
Set in Bhutan
15	6	"Penan"	Ghosts of the Forest	25 September 2007	14 September 2007
Set in Sarawak, Borneo

== Songs for Survival (2008) ==
Alongside the Tribe (and Parry's next Amazon) series a 2-CD album, Songs for Survival, has been released by Kensaltown Records which features a variety of artists such as Mike Oldfield, Johnny Borrell, Hot Chip, The Go! Team, Mystery Jets and Yusuf Islam. Every track on the album is exclusive, and has been written especially for the project.

== See also ==
- Mark & Olly: Living with the Tribes (2007)
- Serious (TV series) (2002)
