= The Mosaic Project =

The Mosaic Project may refer to:

- The Mosaic Project (organization), a nonprofit organization based in San Francisco
- The Mosaic Project (album), a 2011 album by Terri Lyne Carrington
