= AAF =

AAF may refer to:

== Aviation ==
- Afghan Air Force
- Aigle Azur (ICAO code), a French airline
- Algerian Air Force
- Army Air Field, an operating base for the US Army Aviation Branch
- Auxiliary Air Force, the original name of the Royal Auxiliary Air Force of the UK
- Apalachicola Regional Airport in Florida, US (IATA airport code AAF)
- United States Army Air Forces, the precursor to the U.S. Air Force

== Military ==
- Albanian Armed Forces
- Afghan Armed Forces

== Organizations ==
- Aboriginal-Australian Fellowship, a Sydney-based Indigenous rights organisation, 1956−1969
- Alliance of American Football, a defunct 2019 US professional American football league
- Amandla AIDS Fund, a charity established by Artists for a New South Africa in 2003
- Amateur Athletic Foundation, the former name of the LA84 Foundation, a Los Angeles-based nonprofit
- American Advertising Federation, a U.S. trade association
- American Accountability Foundation, a U.S. opposition research group
- Animals Asia Foundation, a Hong Kong-based charity
- Association of Adventist Forums, the former name of Adventist Forums, a Seventh-day Adventist group

== Technology ==
- Advanced Authoring Format, an industry standard for high-end exchange of video project data
- Anti-aliasing filter, a filter used to restrict the bandwidth of a signal

== Other uses ==
- 2-Acetylaminofluorene, a biochemical tool
- Alien Ant Farm, an alternative rock band
- All Aboard Florida, the Florida East Coast Industries subsidiary that developed Brightline, a passenger rail service in Florida
- Aranadan language, a Dravidian language of India
- "Advance Australia Fair", the national anthem of Australia
- Applied Art Forms, a fashion brand launched by Scottish musician Guy Berryman
- American Air Filter, today a part of HVAC-equipment-maker Daikin
- Keystone Army Air Field, an acronym of the World War II air force military base
