= Children's Songs for Peace and a Better World =

Studio album by Brett Dennen
- Released: 2003
- Genre: Folk, children's songs
- Length: 31:00
- Label: The Mosaic Project

Brett Dennen chronology
Children's Songs for Peace and a Better World (2003)	Brett Dennen (2004)

Children's Songs for Peace and a Better World is the album released by the non-profit organization called The Mosaic Project. The organization's co-director is Brett Dennen, the folk musician, who wrote and performed the majority of the songs on the album.

== Track listing ==
All songs were written by Brett Dennen and Lara Mendel and performed by Brett Dennen, except where noted.

1. "The Mosaic Project Theme Song" - 3:45
2. "Empathy Song" - 3:00
3. "If I Were an ET" - 2:31
4. "It's Alright to Cry" (Carol Hall) - 1:59
5. "Don't Laugh at Me" (Steve Seskin and Allen Shamblin) - 3:37
6. "Fighting Is Not the Solution" - 3:01
7. "Dance and Be Free" - 2:58
8. "Amani (Serian's Song)" (Serian Leti Strauss) - 2:16
9. "Paz" - 1:59
10. "Salaam" (Mosh Ben Ari) - 2:46
11. "We Are the Mosaic" - 3:14
