= The May Street Project =

Studio album by Shea Seger
- Released: October 30, 2000
- Recorded: 2000, London
- Genre: Pop
- Length: 42:39
- Label: RCA
- Producer: Martin Terefe

Professional ratings
Review scores
Source	Rating
Entertainment Weekly	B+
The Guardian	4/5 stars
Orlando Weekly	(favourable)

The May Street Project is the debut album by singer-songwriter Shea Seger. It was released in the United Kingdom on October 30, 2000, and in the United States on June 5, 2001.

== Track listing ==
1. "Last Time" (Shea Seger, Nick Whitecross, Martin Terefe) – 3:55
2. "Clutch" (Shea Seger, Kenna Zmedkun) – 3:54
3. "Blind Situation" (featuring D.R.U.G.S.) (Shea Seger, Nick Whitecross, Pharrell Williams) – 4:15
4. "Shatterwall" (Shea Seger, Nick Whitecross, Martin Terefe) – 3:13
5. "Interlude: Roof Top Animals" (Shea Seger, Nick Whitecross) – 0:36
6. "I Love You Too Much" (Shea Seger, Nick Whitecross, Martin Terefe) – 3:21
7. "Walk on Rainbows" (Shea Seger, Nick Whitecross, Martin Terefe) – 3:17
8. "Always" (featuring Ron Sexsmith) (Martin Terefe, Nick Whitecross) – 3:14
9. "Twisted (Never Again)" (Shea Seger, Martin Terefe, Nick Whitecross) – 3:26
10. "Wasting the Rain" (Michael Ruff) – 3:15
11. "Isn't It Good" (Shea Seger, Nick Whitecross, Martin Terefe) – 4:07
12. "I Can't Lie" (Shea Seger, Martin Terefe, Nick Whitecross) – 2:48
13. "May Street" (Shea Seger, Nick Whitecross) – 3:09

== Release history ==
Region	Date	Label	Notes
United Kingdom	October 30, 2000	BMG	
United States	June 5, 2001	RCA	
Japan	2006		Includes a "Clutch" remix by The Neptunes as a bonus track

== UK singles ==
- "Last Time" (October 2, 2000)
- "Clutch" (April 23, 2001)
- "I Love You Too Much" (September 24, 2001)
