= Mark Anstice =

Scottish explorer and writer

Mark Anstice (born 17 May 1967 in the Angus Glens area of Scotland) is a Scottish explorer, adventurous documentary reality television film maker and writer. He is best known for appearing in the Travel Channel's series Mark & Olly: Living with the Tribes with Oliver Steeds.

== Army career ==
After school, Anstice travelled extensively throughout Australia and Asia. In London he joined the 5th Royal Inniskilling Dragoon Guards of the British Army. Anstice spent six years in the guards with operational commitments in the Middle East, Central America and Bosnia, leaving the service in 1995 as a captain.

== Television career ==
In 2000, Mark travelled along with his friend Bruce Parry for 77 days to climb the south face of Puncak Mandala in the Indonesian part of New Guinea. This is the third highest mountain of Australasia, but is little known and had only been climbed once before, from the north. During the expedition, the team had first contact with some members of the Korowai tribe. In the course of the expedition, the adventure documentary, Extreme Lives: Cannibals and Crampons. was co-directed and written along with Bruce Parry. The film won both the Banff Mountain Film Festival and Kendal Mountain Film Festival.

Mark subsequently wrote the book First Contact, published by Eye Books in 2004, which chronicled the expedition to Mount Mandela.

== Television filmography ==
- Extreme Lives: Cannibals and Crampons (2002)
- First Contact (2006) – a BBC Anthropology series presentation (set in West Papua New Guinea) surrounding the ethics of "First Contact" experiences staged by tour operators
- Blizzard: Race to the Pole (2006)
- Mark & Olly: Living with the Tribes (2007)
- Worlds Lost Tribes: The New Adventures of Mark and Olly (2007–2009)
- Secrets of the Tribes (2010)
- Ben Fogle: New Lives in the Wild (2025)

== Personal life ==
Anstice is married to Ayelen, who is Argentinian. They have two children and live in Morocco where they operate The Serai, a retreat centre near Essaouira.
