= Apparatjik =

Multinational electronic band

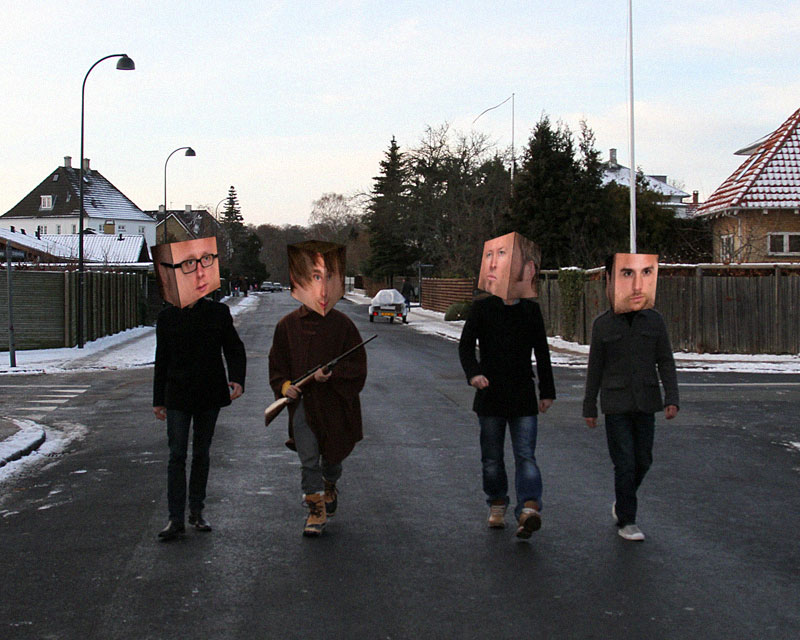
- The members of Apparatjik as "Cubeheads" in 2010

Background information
- Genres: Electronic; alternative rock; experimental; synth-pop
- Years active: 2008–present
- Labels: MetaMerge Un Ltd
- Spinoff of: a-ha; Coldplay; Mew
- Members: Guy Berryman; Jonas Bjerre; Magne Furuholmen; Martin Terefe
- Website: apparatjik.com

Apparatjik (/æpəˈrætʃɪk/ ap-ə-RAT-chik) are a multi-national band formed in 2008. The band is a supergroup that consists of bassist Guy Berryman from Coldplay, guitarist/keyboardist Magne Furuholmen from a-ha, singer/guitarist Jonas Bjerre of Mew and drummer/producer Martin Terefe. The band's name literal translation is "agent of the apparatus". Apparatjik is based on apparatchik, which is a word of Russian origin and is used to describe "an official or bureaucrat in any organization" but has in the past had other meanings, including "Communist agent or spy".

== History ==
The band first came together for a charity album for Survival International called Songs for Survival. The album was produced by Martin Terefe and Molly Oldfield, and the band produced the first track on the album, "Ferreting". This track was used as the theme music for the Amazon series on BBC 2. Subsequently they continued to work together in Magne Furuholmen's studio in Norway, and created more tracks that were periodically made available on their Myspace and YouTube pages. On 30 November, they released the first official track, "Electric Eye", from their then-upcoming album through their website.

Apparatjik's first live performance was at the eleventh edition of club transmediale, an annual festival in Berlin, which took place from 28 January to 7 February 2010. This gig consisted of the band performing inside a specially constructed cube at the WMF on 1 February 2010. The same day saw the release of their debut album, titled We Are Here, for digital download via their official website. Their first public performances took place at the Deutsche Bank towers in Frankfurt from 2–4 March 2011. They have since released further singles, their 4 Can Keep A Secret If 3 Of Them Are Dead extended-play, and on 15 June 2010 they re-released We Are Here on iTunes in standard and deluxe versions.

After playing at the Flø festival in Norway in June, on 23 September 2010, the band played their third concert in London. The cube was transported to the red summer pavilion, designed by Jean Nouvel, when Molly Oldfield brought the group to the Serpentine Galleries, in Hyde Park, London. They were invited by the Serpentine Gallery to play at the Future Contemporaries party.

Apparatjik's first song to be played on BBC Radio 1 was a radio edit of "Datascroller", which aired on 14 June 2010. In November 2010, Magne Furuholmen revealed the promise for "a few very exciting things with [Apparatjik] in 2011" during a BBC Radio 2 interview.

Apparatjik launched a new project called agreeneryouniverse on 11 February 2011. This project invites people across the world to plant a tree, make a picture and upload it to their website. The first 1,000 people in doing so would receive new music as a gift. A download-only single was released on 28 March 2011 called "Combat Disco Music".

On 11 November 2011, Apparatjik released their second album, Square Peg In A Round Hole, as a free iPad application. Four days later it was given away as a gift as part of the agreeneryouniverse project.

The band collaborated with Canadian singer Lowell, who drummer and producer Martin Terefe had been working with beforehand, and released the extended play If You Can, Solve This Jumble (stylized as Apparatjik Presents Lowell: if YOu_ _ caN, 5olve thi5 jumble?) on 29 October 2012. Each track in the extended play features lead vocals by Lowell.

On 1 February 2020, Apparatjik uploaded a video titled "20 3 20" on their social media, containing a short music clip. It was later posted by the members on their social media accounts. Magne Furuholmen elaborated on the clip on his Instagram account, writing that "the entire song will be out soon, [sic] (on an app most likely)" and that it was part of an ongoing Julia Pastrana project. A single was released on 20 March 2020 called "Julia", accompanied by a lyric video.

== Members ==
- Jonas Bjerre – lead vocals, guitar
- Magne Furuholmen – vocals, guitar, keyboards
- Guy Berryman – vocals, bass
- Martin Terefe – drums, vocals

== Discography ==
=== Albums ===
- We Are Here (Released: 1 February 2010)
- Square Peg in a Round Hole (Released: 19 March 2012)

=== Extended plays ===
- 4 Can Keep a Secret If 3 of Them Are Dead (Released: 21 May 2010)
- If You Can, Solve This Jumble (with Lowell) (Released: 29 October 2012)

=== Singles ===
Year	Single	Release date	Album
2009	"Ferreting" (Download release)	September 15	Songs for Survival
2009	"Electric Eye" (Download release)	November 30	We Are Here
2010	"Antlers" / "Electric Eye" (7 inch vinyl, 1000 copies)	February 8	We Are Here
2010	"4 Can Keep a Secret If 3 of Them Are Dead" (Download release)	May 23	4 Can Keep a Secret If 3 of Them Are Dead
2010	"Datascroller" (Download release)	June 14	We Are Here
2011	"Combat Disco Music" (Download release)	March 28	Square Peg in a Round Hole
2011	"Time Police" (Download release)	December 13	Square Peg in a Round Hole
2012	"Sequential" (Download release)	March 20	Square Peg in a Round Hole
2012	"Shake Him Off" (Download release)	July 3	If You Can, Solve This Jumble

=== Music videos ===
Year	Title	Director
2009	"Electric Eye"	Martin Terefe
2009	"Antlers"	Jonas Bjerre
2010	"Datascroller"	Unknown
2010	"4 Can Keep a Secret If 3 of Them Are Dead"	Unknown
2010	"Supersonic Sound"	Unknown
2010	"Arrow and Bow"	Unknown
2011	"Snow Crystals"	Unknown
2012	"Shake Him Off"	Lowell
2012	"Kids"	Lowell
2012	"Run Little Horsey"	Lowell
2012	"The Birds"	Lowell
2013	"That's the Thing About Us"	Lowell
