= Square Peg in a Round Hole =

Studio album by Apparatjik
- Released: 21 February 2012
- Recorded: 2011–2012
- Genres: Experimental rock, alternative rock, electronic rock, art pop, alternative dance, indie rock
- Label: Meta Merge Un
- Producer: Apparatjik

Apparatjik chronology
| We Are Here (2010) | Square Peg in a Round Hole (2012) |

Square Peg in a Round Hole Drafts

Singles from Square Peg in a Round Hole
- 1. "COmbat disco music" Released: 21 May 2011; 2. "timepoLice" Released: 13 December 2011; 3. "cervux seQuential" Released: 20 March 2012

Square Peg in a Round Hole, (often misquoted as Apparatjik World) is the second studio album from rock supergroup Apparatjik. It was originally released via Apparatjik's iPad application, Apparatjik World, on 11 November 2011, as the "first edition" of the album. The production of the album included the help and support of Apparatjik fans to produce a further 10 more editions of the album before the final version was released on 21 February 2012.

== Track listing ==
All songs written and composed by Guy Berryman, Jonas Bjerre, Magne Furuholmen and Martin Terefe.

| No. | Title | Length |
|---|---|---|
| 1. | "timepoLice" (feat. Auto Goon) | 3:21 |
| 2. | "cervux seQuential" (feat. Lisa A) | 4:40 |
| 3. | "tell the bAbes" | 3:53 |
| 4. | "signs of waking uP" | 3:35 |
| 5. | "do IT myself" (feat. Auto Goon) | 3:05 |
| 6. | "BlastLOCKet" (feat. Ceto A and L Gortex A) | 3:45 |
| 7. | "pakt" | 1:24 |
| 8. | "COmbat disco music" | 3:42 |
| 9. | "your voice needS SUBtitles" | 3:51 |
| 10. | "(don't Eat The whole) banana" | 3:27 |
| 11. | "gzMO" | 4:17 |
| 12. | "superpositions" | 1:30 |
| 13. | "control Park" | 3:51 |
| Total length: | | 44:21 |

== Release history ==
| Date | Draft No. | Format |
|---|---|---|
| 11 November 2011 | Initial release | Digital Download |
| 13 December 2011 | First | Digital Download |
| 20 December 2011 | Second | Digital Download |
| 27 December 2011 | Third | Digital Download |
| 3 January 2012 | Fourth | Digital Download |
| 10 January 2012 | Fifth | Digital Download |
| 17 January 2012 | Sixth | Digital Download |
| 24 January 2012 | Seventh | Digital Download |
| 31 January 2012 | Eighth | Digital Download |
| 7 February 2012 | Ninth | Digital Download |
| 14 February 2012 | Tenth | Digital Download |
| 21 February 2012 | Final Version | Digital Download |
| 19 March 2012 | Final Version | CD |
