= Marshall Corwin =

British television producer

Marshall Corwin is a British television producer. He is Creative Director of Fresh Start Media and the first Head of Content for the new global environmental streaming platform Ecoflix. He has written and produced two flagship documentaries for the Channel: Free Billy about the campaign to free a captive elephant held for more than 30 years in LA Zoo, and Sanctuary: Elephant Nature Park highlighting the remarkable work of founder Lek Chailert, dubbed the 'elephant whisperer'.

Marshall has been the showrunner on Discovery's top global hit Gold Rush, and he also developed and produced the BAFTA-winning CITV series Bear Grylls Survival School.

Undercover documentaries he filmed and produced include two high-profile films for BBC Panorama: In the Shadow of the Stadiums documented widespread under-ago prostitution in the run up to the 2014 World Cup in Brazil, and Educating North Korea gained unprecedented access to the secretive State.

Marshall was Series Producer of all eight seasons of the ground-breaking BBC Children's Serious TV series which he created: Serious Jungle (2002), Serious Desert (2003), Serious Arctic (2004), Serious Amazon (2005), Serious Andes (2006), Serious Ocean (2008), Serious Explorers: Livingstone (2010), and Serious Explorers: Raleigh (2011). The extreme adventure series has won fifteen major awards, including four BAFTAs and three Royal Television Society awards, and is seen in a hundred and fifty countries.

He is the author of a book to accompany the series: Extreme Survival: An Adventurer's Guide to the World's Most Dangerous Places (foreword by Bruce Parry). In addition he has written several other children's factual books, and he co-authored Undercover, documenting unprecedented secret filming in sub-standard Romanian and Turkish orphanages with the involvement of the Duchess of York and her daughters Princesses Beatrice and Eugenie.

He was Series Producer of the children's news programme Newsround, with responsibility for its short documentaries, Newsound Extra. He won an International Emmy for a Newsround Extra documentary War Child filmed in Mostar at the end of the Bosnian War. He has also been a Senior Producer in BBC factual programmes, making shows such as Tomorrow's World, Megalab and the 1999 Total Eclipse.

Born in Leeds, Marshall read maths at Oxford University before becoming a Secondary maths teacher. He has also been a Radio 4 announcer and presenter. He lives in London with his partner and two children.
