= Brett Dennen (album) =

Studio album by Brett Dennen
- Released: November 24, 2003
- Recorded: Camp Chaffee Studio, Ventura, CA
- Genres: Folk, pop
- Length: 48:44
- Labels: Three Angels and a Saint
- Producers: Leslie Merical & Brett Dennen

Brett Dennen chronology
Children's Songs for Peace and a Better World (2003)	Brett Dennen (2003)	So Much More (2006)

Professional ratings
Review scores
Source	Rating
AllMusic	2.5/5 stars

Brett Dennen is the first studio album by the American musician Brett Dennen. It was released in 2003 by Three Angels and a Saint Records.

== Track listing ==
All tracks are written by Brett Dennen and Randy Schwartz (drummer, vocalist on "Day By Day").

No.	Title	Length
1.	"Blessed"	3:20
2.	"Desert Sunrise"	5:10
3.	"All We Have"	6:52
4.	"By & By"	3:52
5.	"Make the Most"	3:43
6.	"Don't Forget"	3:59
7.	"Just Like the Moon"	4:52
8.	"When I Go"	6:47
9.	"Nothing Lasts Forever"	4:17
10.	"Oh the Glorious"	4:38
11.	"Day By Day"	1:18
Total length:		48:44
