= Mark & Olly: Living with the Tribes =

- Genre: Documentary; Reality; Geography
- Starring: Mark Anstice; Oliver Steeds
- Country of origin: United States
- Original language: English
- No. of seasons: 3
- No. of episodes: 23

Production
- Running time: 45 minutes

Original release
- Network: Travel Channel
- Release: January 14, 2007 – March 29, 2009

Mark & Olly: Living with the Tribes is a group of three documentary adventure reality television series that aired on BBC Knowledge and the Travel Channel which premiered in 2007. The program follows British explorers Mark Anstice and Oliver Steeds as they travel around the world to reside with indigenous peoples. The series was produced by Cicada Productions and distributed by FremantleMedia.

In 2011, the third season of the series was accused of faking scenes and mistranslating interviews to portray the Machiguenga tribe negatively.

== Episodes ==
=== Season 1 (2007) ===
Living with the Kombai: The Adventures of Mark and Olly premiered in 2007. The season follows Mark and Olly as they live with the Kombai tribe of West Papua in Indonesia. The forest tribe demonstrates methods and techniques of solving problems using skills and tools unfamiliar to the civilised. Mark and Olly do as the Kombai do 24 hours a day for the entire run of the show.

No.	Title	Original release date
1	"Finding the Kombai Tribe"	January 14, 2007
Extreme travelers Mark Anstice and Olly Steeds begin a unique expedition into the rainforests of West Papua to track down and live with the remarkable Kombai tribe, a people whose way of life hasn't changed since the Stone Age.
2	"Living off the Land"	January 14, 2007
Mark and Olly learn to live off the jungle in the same manner as the Kombai.
3	"Home Sweet Home"	January 21, 2007
Mark and Olly attempt to make their own treehouse, but their efforts are futile. The Kombai offer to build them their own treehouse.
4	"Justice System"	January 21, 2007
Mark and Olly uncover the brutal reality of the Kombai justice system, when a murder is committed.
5	"Giving Back"	January 28, 2007
Mark and Olly create some gifts for the tribe.
6	"Sago Grub Festival"	January 28, 2007
The tribe has a festival and invites Mark and Olly to be hosts.
7	"Best of"	?
The documentary highlights some of the best moments.

=== Season 2 (2008) ===
Living with the Mek: The Adventures of Mark and Olly premiered on Sunday, February 10, 2008. It charts Mark and Olly's time with the Mek tribe.

No.	Title	Original release date
8	"Journey to the Unknown"	February 1, 2008
Mark and Olly trek through the mountains of West Papua seeking a sufficiently remote village for their adventure. After an unwelcoming greeting, they convince the village of Merringman to allow them to stay.
9	"The Test"	February 17, 2008
Mark and Olly get bossed about by chief Markus, eat tadpole kebab, get roped into a wedding from hell and, to their horror, hear tales of tribal revenge killings.
10	"Birth, Death & Initiation"	February 24, 2008
Mark and Olly get bossed about, suffer from sleep deprivation, attend an elder's funeral and get initiated in the tribe's traditional penis gourds - painful!
11	"Home Sweet Home"	March 2, 2008
Mark Anstice and Olly Steeds begin constructing a new house, are reprimanded for not wearing their traditional penis gourds, hear gossip about sex lives in the village and become embroiled in a tribal rape trial.
12	"Dark Side of the Mek"	March 9, 2008
A sighting of suangi leaves the tribe terrified that they may be under attack by supernatural forces. As Mark and Olly help rebuild the village, Merengman's dark past rears its ugly head, and the tribe is forced to call on the services of a traveling shaman.
13	"Bridging the Divide"	March 16, 2008
A food shortage calls for desperate measures and the tribe are forced to build a bridge across the river to get help from their traditional enemy, the village of Minay.
14	"The Battle of Beliefs"	March 23, 2008
Mark and Olly visit their tribe's traditional enemy, only to find money, clothes and religion.
15	"Farewell to the Mek"	March 30, 2008
Merringmen throws a farewell party for Mark and Olly before they leave for home.

=== Season 3 (2009) ===
Mark & Olly: Living with the Machigenga aired from February 8, 2009 to March 29, 2009. The show airs at 10 PM ET on Sundays. It charts Mark and Olly's time with the Machiguenga tribe.

No.	Title	Original release date
16	"Strangers in the Rainforest"	February 8, 2009
Mark and Olly trek through the jungle to the Machigenga village Koran Korata, where they must prove themselves worthy of living in the village.
17	"Hell or Heaven"	February 15, 2009
Mark and Olly visit a local shaman near Koran Korata who guides them on a drug induced spiritual journey.
18	"When a House Becomes a Home"	February 22, 2009
Mark and Olly must build a house to live in. Mark is asked to care for an orphaned Woolly Monkey
19	"Trouble in Paradise"	March 1, 2009
Chief José's son goes missing after a sudden rain causes the river to rise to dangerous levels. A gang of armed colonistas unexpectedly visit the village. José's pregnant wife Rosita goes into labor.
20	"Boys to Men"	March 8, 2009
Mark & Olly must defend the village's reputation in a local tournament where they compete in archery and eating! They also endure a tribal ceremony where they are stung by bees. They are also taught to hunt and track down monkeys.
21	"Show Me the Money"	March 15, 2009
It's harvest time in the village and the excess crops must be transported downriver and exchanged for metal goods. But first Mark and Olly must successfully build a dugout canoe from the villages most ancient and valuable cedar.
22	"Father of the Bride"	March 22, 2009
Mark & Olly hear they may get to witness the ancient rituals of a wedding. But before he will give his daughter's hand in marriage, the chief wants to test the young suitors manliness, and Mark and Olly must provide some healthy competition.
23	"The End of the Affair"	March 29, 2009
After four months living with the Machigenga, Mark and Olly prepare to leave the village of Koran Korata

== Controversy ==
The series was accused of fabricating translations of interviews with the Machiguenga to portray the tribe as "sex-obsessed, mean savages" during its third season. Glenn Shepard, an anthropologist who has worked with the tribe for more than two decades, and Ron Snell, who grew up with the tribe as the son of American missionaries, called the show "staged, false, fabricated and distorted." Both speak the tribe's language fluently. Shepard compared the show's methods to the film Borat.

Survival International director Stephen Corry said: "One stereotype followed another, with the [tribe] variously portrayed as callous, perverted, cruel, and savage ... TV is now getting away with portrayals which wouldn't be out of place in the Victorian era." BBC Worldwide has decided not to air the show again. The allegations were completely rejected by the broadcasters, producers and distributors.

== See also ==
- Tribe – another TV series with a similar premise
