= So Much More (Brett Dennan album) =

Studio album by Brett Dennen
- Released: September 2006
- Genre: Folk, pop
- Label: Dualtone
- Producer: Kevin McCormick

Brett Dennen chronology
Brett Dennen (2004)	So Much More (2006)	(More) So Much More (2007)

Alternative covers

Professional ratings
Review scores
Source	Rating
Allmusic	link

So Much More is the second studio album by the American singer-songwriter Brett Dennen.

In an issue of Rolling Stone following the release of the album, John Mayer commented, "He paints these gorgeous pictures musically." Dennen has toured with Mayer and opened for several of his concerts in 2006 and 2007.

== Composition ==
So Much More's lyrics are mostly concerned with questioning the way things are. The album's tracks contain philosophical lyrics in which Dennen indicated that he asks questions but does not answer them.

== Track listing ==
All songs were written by Dennen.

1. Ain't No Reason - 3:39
2. There Is So Much More - 5:07
3. Darlin' Do Not Fear - 5:12
4. Because You Are a Woman - 4:12
5. She's Mine - 4:33
6. The One Who Loves You the Most - 5:01
7. I Asked When - 6:19
8. When You Feel It - 4:49
9. So Long Sweet Misery - 5:58
10. Someday - 3:50
11. Can't Slow Down (bonus track) - 5:41
12. Fig Tree (bonus track) - 5:26
13. Follow Your Heart (bonus track) - 2:52
14. Made for Better Things (bonus track) - 3:23

== Personnel ==
- Perla Batalla - vocals
- Mario Calire - drums
- Jim Christie - drums
- Luis Conte - percussion
- Mark Goldenberg - electric guitar, ukulele, accordion
- Jennifer Grais - vocals
- Kevin McCormick - bass guitar
- Keb' Mo' - slide guitar
- Justin "El Niño" Porée - percussion
- Randy Schwartz - mandolin, drums, background vocals
- Scott Thurston - organ
- Brett Dennen - vocals, guitar, mandolin
