= Guy Berryman =

Scottish bassist (born 1978)

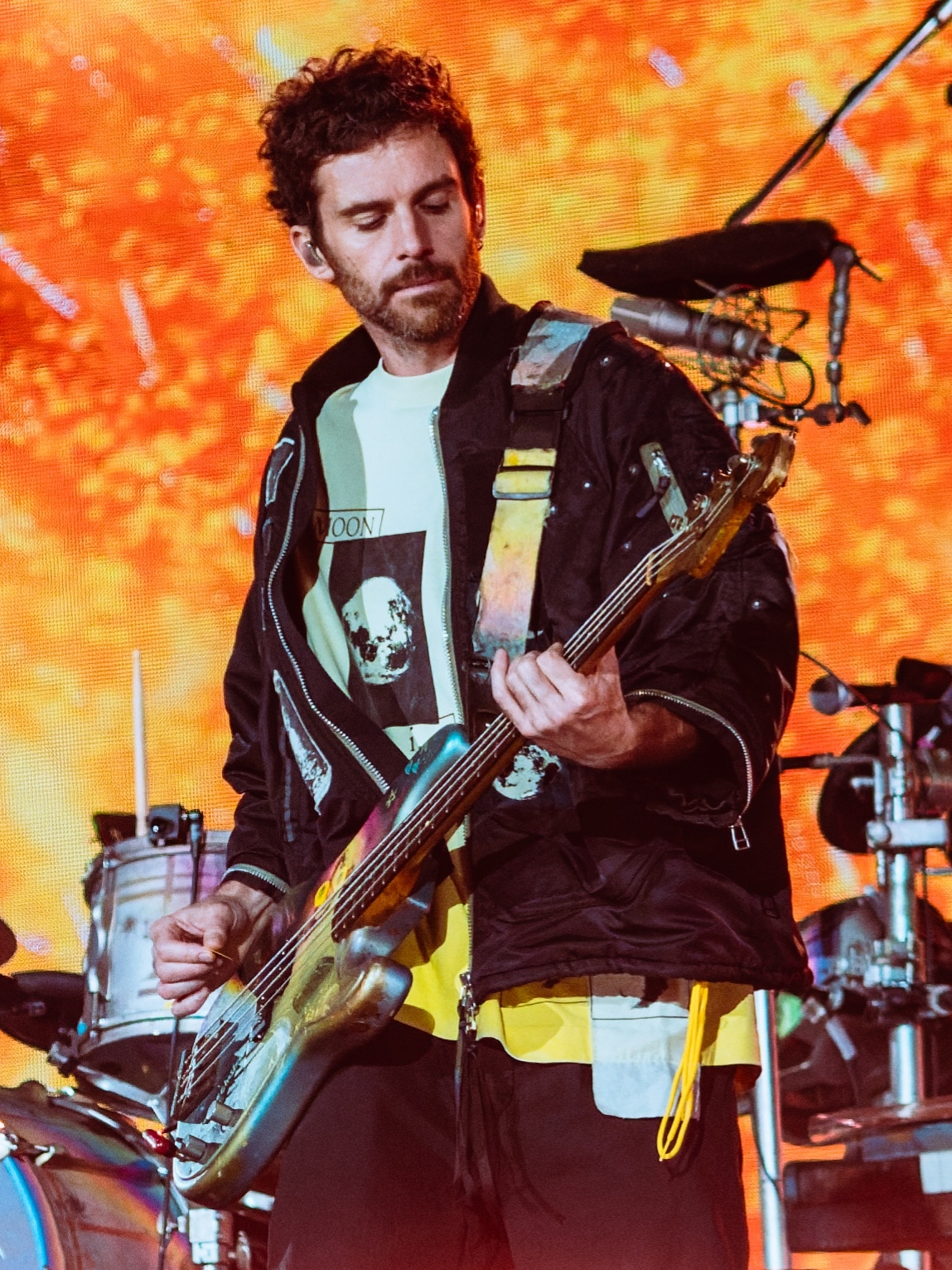
- Berryman at Wembley Stadium in 2025
- Born: Guy Rupert Berryman; 12 April 1978 (age 48); Kirkcaldy, Fife, Scotland
- Education: University College London (dropped out)
- Occupations: Musician; songwriter; record producer; businessman; designer
- Years active: 1997–present
- Organisation: Applied Art Forms
- Spouses: Joanna Briston (m. 2004; div. 2007) Winona Oak (m. 2026)
- Partner: Keshia Gerrits (2012–2025)
- Children: 3
- Awards: Full list
- Musical career
- Origin: London, England
- Genres: Alternative rock; pop rock; post-Britpop; pop; electronic; experimental; synth-pop
- Instruments: Bass; keyboards; percussion; synthesisers; vocals
- Labels: Fierce Panda; Parlophone; Nettwerk; Capitol; Atlantic
- Member of: Coldplay; Apparatjik

Guy Rupert Berryman (born 12 April 1978) is a Scottish musician, songwriter, record producer, businessman and designer. He is best known as the bassist of the rock band Coldplay and electronic supergroup Apparatjik. Raised in Kirkcaldy, he started to play bass at an early age, drawing inspiration from James Brown, the Funk Brothers and Kool & the Gang. His projects beyond music include The Road Rat magazine and Amsterdam-based fashion brand Applied Art Forms.

Berryman joined Coldplay with Chris Martin, Jonny Buckland and Will Champion at University College London, where he enrolled in a mechanical engineering degree but later dropped out. The band signed with Parlophone in 1999, finding global fame after the release of Parachutes (2000) and subsequent records. He has won seven Grammy Awards and nine Brit Awards as part of Coldplay. Having sold over 170 million records worldwide, they are the most successful group of the 21st century.

== Early life ==
Guy Rupert Berryman was born on 12 April 1978 in Kirkcaldy, Fife, Scotland. He is the youngest son of engineer Rupert Berryman and his wife Elizabeth, whose family were merchants and factory owners in the region. Raised close to the Beveridge Park area, he said his childhood was one with "a huge sense of freedom", as he went out with friends and "just did whatever we wanted from a very young age", which included exploring the Raith Estate and the woods near it. Still during his childhood, he developed a passion for watches, exploring the ones his father had even though "the drawers were meant to be off-limits".

Berryman said that listening to Stevie Wonder's "My Cherie Amour" (1969) was a pivotal moment in his life, as well as the reason why he decided to become a bass player: "I can remember being maybe six years old, having this experience. I had obviously heard music in the background, in the house and stuff, but that was the first moment that I ever connected with music on a personal level and since then I've always been a huge fan of soul and Motown".

With his father involved in building the Channel Tunnel as a project manager, Berryman's family moved to Kent when he was around 12 years old, the same period in which he began to play bass. During his time at Edinburgh Academy, he played drums and trumpet for the school band. The lessons made him notice he was "a leftie who plays right-handed" and the bassist later founded a group named Time Out. His education was continued at Kent College, in Canterbury. He then enrolled in mechanical engineering at University College London, where he met Chris Martin, Jonny Buckland and Will Champion, ultimately forming Coldplay.

== Career ==
=== Coldplay ===
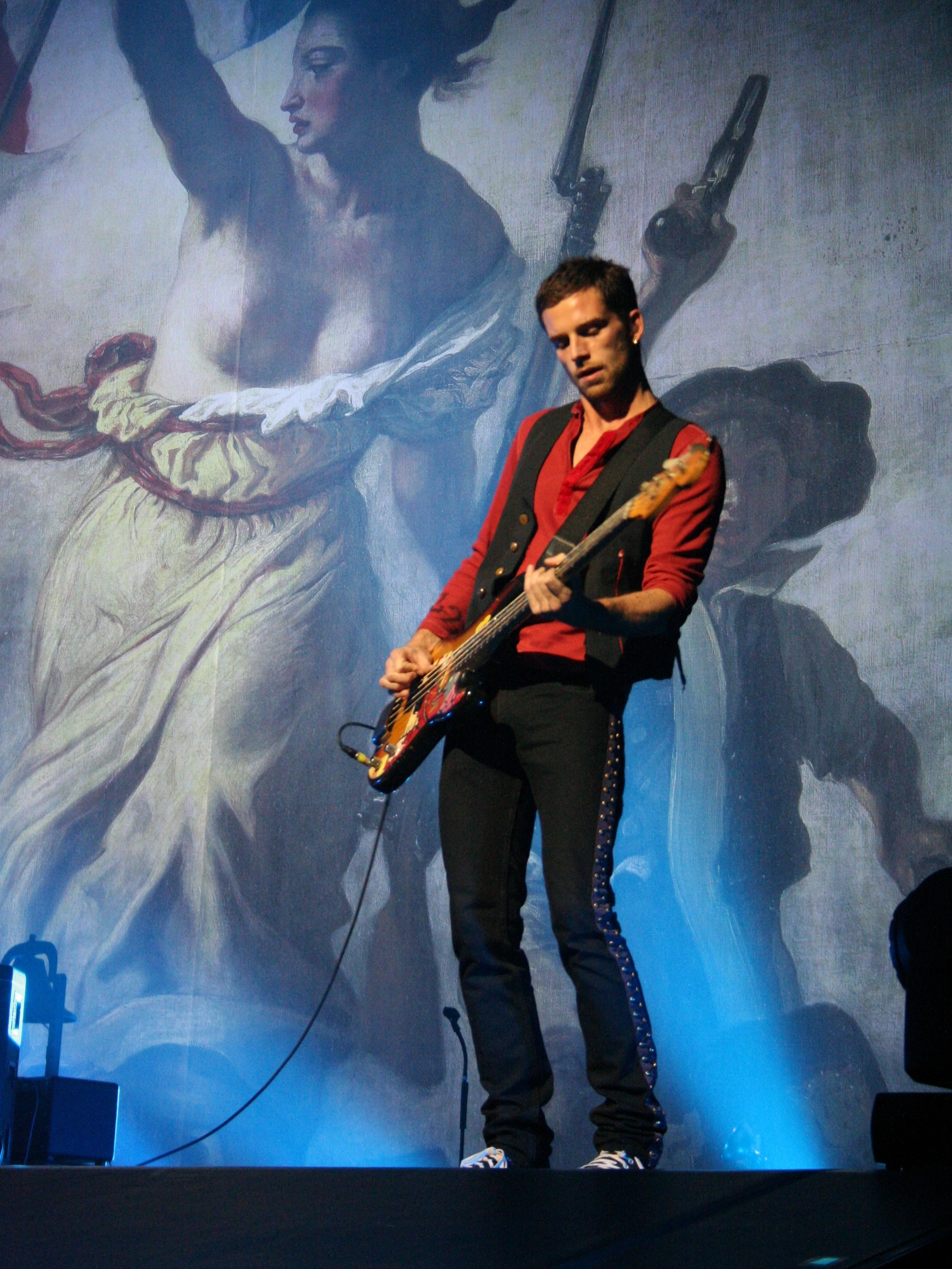
Berryman playing the bass during Viva la Vida Tour in September 2008

Berryman was the third member to join the band in 1997. Their college friend Kris Foof described him as "a quiet young man who had been put in Paris Block, the less populated block of rooms in Ramsay Hall. The rest of the band had been placed in New York Block, but not Guy—he was the outsider [that the insiders all knew about], namely from his stockpile of musical instruments". Martin commented that he had a wrong impression of the bassist on their first meeting: "He's not as scary as he looks [...] Everyone thinks he's moody, soft-spoken is better". They practised along with Buckland and eventually recorded a demo despite not having a drummer, calling themselves Big Fat Noises by November of that year. Champion completed the performing line-up in 1998. (Note: Overall, the fifth and final member was music manager and creative director Phil Harvey.) Berryman later dropped out of engineering and enrolled in a seven-year architecture programme at the Bartlett, which he subsequently abandoned to focus on his music career. He worked as a bartender to pay rent.

In the Head Full of Dreams (2018) documentary, the bassist mentioned that recording X&Y (2005) and executing its rollout marked a very tumultuous period for the band, as they had frequent arguments, particularly between him and Martin: "I was probably much more opinionated back then, which was a huge pain in the ass for everyone, I don't know if I was trying to get away from myself or if I wasn't comfortable with myself, but I definitely had a drinking problem". When the band were asked about their creative process in an interview for The Howard Stern Show, they claimed that while Buckland is usually more optimistic to either disapprove or give his input on Martin's initial ideas, Berryman tends to be more critical, concluding that if he does not like a certain song, "there's no point in ever playing it again". Conversely, he has been responsible for starting tracks such as "Magic" on his own, which was released as the lead single for their sixth album, Ghost Stories, in 2014.

=== Apparatjik ===
Berryman formed a supergroup called Apparatjik with Magne Furuholmen (from a-ha), Jonas Bjerre (from Mew) and Martin Terefe in 2008. Their debut single, "Ferreting", was the musical theme of BBC Two's Amazon and featured on the Songs for Survival compilation. Revenue was donated in support of Survival International. Two years later, the band released We Are Here (2010) for digital download on their official website and performed at the CTM Festival. In 2011, they played at the Neue Nationalgalerie, appeared at the Steirischer Herbst Festival, then launched Apparatjik World, an iPad app where fans could help them produce new songs. After going through several editions, the project was named Square Peg in a Round Hole (2012) and made available as their second album. In 2020, "Julia" was published on the group's YouTube channel. Furuholmen noted that he was in talks with Apparatjik about making a record complemented by visuals during an interview for Record Collector in 2025, but did not confirm if it would go ahead.

=== Business ventures ===
In 2019, the bassist founded quarterly magazine The Road Rat along with two friends and car specialists. They celebrate classic automobiles, but on-diary stories are not covered because each issue is meant to be "timeless". He oversees the project from his garage and works as its creative director. In the following year, he launched Applied Art Forms, a fashion brand inspired by utilitarian, workwear and military clothing, including designers Helmut Lang, Katharine Hamnett and Martin Margiela. Berryman set its headquarters in Amsterdam and handles both styling and creative direction, though the former role is shared with Marcel Verheijen. He said that his focus is on longevity, making occasional updates instead of following the traditional seasonal calendar. The bassist also mentioned taking a sewing machine with him while touring with Coldplay to mock up pieces. Still in 2020, he assisted the launch of plant-based protein food start-up Bodyhero. A garment collection pulled from his personal archive was donated to Marrkt in 2022, with earnings going to Save the Children. In 2023, Applied Art Forms switched its menswear presentation to unisex. Berryman released an exclusive jewellery line that same year, teaming up with Hannah Martin to use industrial and punk aesthetics. In 2026, he stepped down from his role as creative director of the brand.

=== Other projects ===
Berryman guested on Magne Furuholmen's debut album, Past Perfect Future Tense (2004), along with Champion. He played bass on the subsequent A Dot of Black in the Blue of Your Bliss (2008) as well. In 2007, he wrote "Guy Romance Theme" and co-wrote "Bass Theme" for the soundtrack of The Longest Night in Shanghai. His most notable hobby over the years has been photography, which included taking backstage photos of his bandmates with a disposable camera on the Twisted Logic Tour (2005–2007) and throwing them to attendees. He then provided pictures for the booklet of a-ha's ninth album, Foot of the Mountain (2009). Accompanied by Rik Simpson, the bassist founded a producing duo called The Darktones and contributed to Love You More (2010) and You&I (2011) by the Pierces. Berryman played instruments such as guitar, glockenspiel, omnichord, keyboards and percussion on the latter. He also produced James Levy & the Blood Red Rose's Pray to Be Free (2012) and Hudson Hank's DayBreak (2013). After creating a photo diary of the Music of the Spheres World Tour (2022–2025) for NME, he contributed to the official tour book.

== Musical style ==
Known for a sound that is considered "slick" and "relaxed", Berryman mostly performs with different models of the Fender Precision Bass, including the Squier, Mustang, Jazz and Jaguar. The latter was used on the recording sessions for Viva la Vida or Death and All His Friends (2008). He mentioned that the first proper bass used after joining Coldplay was a Rickenbacker 4001, which can be seen on the "Shiver" music video. In 2003, his gear encompassed two Ampeg SVT amplifiers, two 15" cabinets, one 8"x10" cabinet and a Tone Bender pedal for distortion. In 2012, it was reported he bought a custom-made Hiwatt bass rig. The 200-watt amp head was hand-built in the United Kingdom and paired with a 4x12 cabinet, loaded with Fane speakers. When questioned about his musical taste, Berryman stated that it was hard to condense it down, but he "could not live without the Beatles or Motown". Additionally, he mentioned James Brown, Marvin Gaye, Kool & the Gang and the Funk Brothers as musical inspirations.

== Personal life ==
According to The Times, Berryman has an estimated wealth of £113 million as of May 2022. He is a known supporter of Raith Rovers. Interests beyond fashion and photography include electrical gadgets. He married interior designer Joanna Briston in 2004. The couple had a daughter but filed for divorce three years later. He eventually moved to the Cotswolds and built a workshop to repair classic cars. His collection features more than 20 automobiles. From 2014 until 2025, Berryman was engaged to model Keshia Gerrits, having two children with her. They lived together in Amsterdam. In 2026, he married singer-songwriter Winona Oak.

Berryman used to take flying lessons, but gave up after struggling to renovate a Spitfire and a Tiger Moth. He collects synthesizers, cameras and watches, commenting that "I'm a completist when it comes to collecting, so I have to restrain myself [...] At least with cars you have to have space to keep them all in". In 2008, he ran the London Marathon, finishing among the Top 2000. He signed up to participate the following year, but pulled out due to a hip injury. Berryman is also the founder of Dawghaus, an online inventory focused on promoting well-established designs along with pieces that deserve more attention. He is the only Coldplay member to have a personal account on social media.

== Discography ==
=== With Coldplay ===
- Parachutes (2000)
- A Rush of Blood to the Head (2002)
- X&Y (2005)
- Viva la Vida or Death and All His Friends (2008)
- Mylo Xyloto (2011)
- Ghost Stories (2014)
- A Head Full of Dreams (2015)
- Everyday Life (2019)
- Music of the Spheres (2021)
- Moon Music (2024)

=== With Apparatjik ===
- We Are Here (2010)
- Square Peg in a Round Hole (2012)

=== Solo credits ===
- Past Perfect Future Tense (2004) – bassist
- "Guy Romance Theme" (2007) – writer
- "Bass Theme" (2007) – co-writer
- A Dot of Black in the Blue of Your Bliss (2008) – bassist
- Foot of the Mountain (2009) – photographer
- Love You More (2010) – producer
- You&I (2011) – producer
- Pray to Be Free (2012) – producer
- Daybreak (2013) – producer

== See also ==
- List of people associated with University College London
- List of British Grammy winners and nominees
- List of best-selling music artists
- List of highest-grossing live music artists
- List of artists who reached number one on the UK Singles Chart
