= Por Favor (album) =

Studio album by Brett Dennen
- Released: May 20, 2016
- Genre: Folk, pop
- Length: 38:54
- Label: Elektra

Brett Dennen chronology
Smoke and Mirrors (2013)	Por Favor (2016)

Por Favor is the sixth studio album by the American singer-songwriter Brett Dennen. It was released on May 20, 2016, by Elektra Records.

== Track listing ==
All lyrics are written by Brett Dennen; all music is composed by Brett Dennen.

No.	Title	Length
1.	"What's The Secret?"	2:49
2.	"Cassidy"	4:28
3.	"Stand Up For It"	3:59
4.	"Bonfire"	3:25
5.	"Strawberry Road"	3:45
6.	"Another Life"	3:51
7.	"Where We Left Off"	4:00
8.	"Burning Spirit"	3:04
9.	"Tengboche"	5:12
10.	"I'll Be On Your Side"	4:21
