= Smoke and Mirrors (Brett Dennen album) =

Studio album by Brett Dennen
- Released: October 22, 2013
- Genre: Folk, pop
- Length: 36:13
- Label: F-Stop/Atlantic

Brett Dennen chronology
Loverboy (2011)	Smoke and Mirrors (2013)	Por Favor (2016)

Smoke and Mirrors is the fifth studio album by the American singer-songwriter Brett Dennen. It was released on October 22, 2013, by F-Stop Music/Atlantic Records. The album peaked at number 65 on the Billboard 200 album chart, number 10 on Billboard's Top Independent Albums chart, and number 19 on Billboard's Top Rock Albums chart.

Professional ratings
Review scores
Source	Rating
Allmusic	4/5 stars

== Track listing ==
All lyrics are written by Brett Dennen; all music is composed by Brett Dennen, except where noted.

No.	Title	Length
1.	"Sweet Persuasion"	3:03
2.	"Wild Child"	3:37
3.	"You Make It Easy"	3:07
4.	"Only Want You"	3:26
5.	"When We Were Young"	4:22
6.	"Smoke and Mirrors"	3:51
7.	"Don't Mess With Karma"	4:09
8.	"Out Of My Head" (Brett Dennen, Sam Hollander, Mike Viola)	3:41
9.	"Not Too Late"	3:30
10.	"Who Am I"	3:27
