= Hope for the Hopeless =

Studio album by Brett Dennen
- Released: October 21, 2008
- Genres: Folk, pop
- Length: 42:41
- Label: Dualtone
- Producer: John Alagia

Brett Dennen chronology
| (More) So Much More (2007) | Hope for the Hopeless (2008) | Loverboy (2011) |

Professional ratings
Review scores
| Source | Rating |
|---|---|
| Allmusic | link |
| Rolling Stone | link |
| About.com | link |
| Entertainment Weekly | B+ link |
| Popmatters | link |
| Paste | 65% link |

Hope for the Hopeless is the third studio album by the American singer-songwriter Brett Dennen. It was released on October 21, 2008, following Dennen's tour of Australia. The Nigerian Afro-beat musician Femi Kuti appears on the album's first single, "Make You Crazy". The album peaked at number 41 on the Billboard 200 album chart, and number 4 on Billboard's Top Independent Albums chart.

Referring to "Make You Crazy", Dennen told Rolling Stone: "I made the song catchy but it's about all the injustice in the world." That song has a music video starring the American singer Mandy Moore. "Heaven" was the second single released from this album and Dennen decided to sell it also on iTunes. Natalie Merchant, the former leading singer of 10,000 Maniacs rock band, appears on this single.

== Critical response ==
Hope for the Hopeless received a score of 71 on Metacritic, which collated reviews from Entertainment Weekly, Allmusic, Popmatters, Paste, Billboard and Rolling Stone. The most favourable review came from Entertainment Weekly's Leah Greenblatt, who hailed the albums "tuneful folk-rock accessibility" before giving it a final rating of B+. Dennen's songwriting was held up to scrutiny by, among others, Popmatters' Aarik Danielsen, who said, in a 7/10 review, "...he’s no Dylan or Lennon, but he does capture the spirit of a generation attracted to the hopeful promise they witnessed in the Obama candidacy."

== Track listing ==
All lyrics are written by Brett Dennen.

| No. | Title | Length |
|---|---|---|
| 1. | "San Francisco" | 3:52 |
| 2. | "Make You Crazy" (featuring Femi Kuti) | 3:38 |
| 3. | "Heaven" | 4:03 |
| 4. | "Closer to You" | 3:38 |
| 5. | "Wrong About Me" | 4:32 |
| 6. | "So Far from Me" | 4:08 |
| 7. | "When She's Gone" | 3:40 |
| 8. | "World Keeps Turning" | 3:01 |
| 9. | "Who Do You Think You Are?" | 4:07 |
| 10. | "Follow Your Heart" | 3:11 |
| 11. | "Ain't Gonna Lose You" | 4:51 |
| Total length: | | 42:41 |

Amazon.com exclusive track
| No. | Title | Length |
|---|---|---|
| 12. | "It Could Make You Cry" | 3:11 |
| Total length: | | 45:52 |

== Personnel ==
The following people contributed to Hope for the Hopeless.

- Brett Dennen - guitar, vocals
- John Alagia - guitar, piano, backing vocals, production
- Tom Freund - Backing vocals
- Mark Goldenberg - guitar
- Missy Higgins - backing vocals
- Sean Hurley - bass guitar
- Femi Kuti - backing vocals
- Zac Rae - keyboards, ukulele
- Joey Waronker - percussion, drums
- Natalie Merchant - vocals
