= Hamilton (1998 film) =

- Theatrical release poster
- Directed by: Harald Zwart
- Screenplay by: William Aldridge; Jonas Cornell
- Based on: Hamilton by Jan Guillou
- Produced by: Ingemar Leijonborg; Hans Lönnerheden
- Starring: Peter Stormare; Lena Olin; Mark Hamill; Terry Carter
- Cinematography: Jérôme Robert
- Edited by: Darek Hodor
- Music by: Trond Bjerknes
- Production companies: Moviola; TV4 (Sweden)
- Distributed by: Buena Vista International
- Release date: 30 January 1998
- Running time: 128 minutes 186 minutes (TV version)
- Country: Sweden
- Languages: Swedish; English; Russian
- Budget: $7.5 million

Hamilton is a 1998 Swedish action film directed by Harald Zwart and starring Peter Stormare, Mark Hamill and Lena Olin. The film was edited with additional scenes into a 3-hour-long TV series in 2001. The 1998 single "No Man's Land" by Ardis was included in the soundtrack to this film.

== Synopsis ==
Swedish military intelligence officers Carl Hamilton (Peter Stormare) and Åke Stålhandske (Mats Långbacka) are ordered to eliminate a band of Russian smugglers on the Russian tundra. The smugglers possess a nuclear missile, a 1.5 megaton SS-20, "enough to turn Paris, Washington or New York to ashes". What they do not know is that the smugglers they have intercepted were only a decoy, while the real missile was shipped to Libya. Mike Hawkins (Mark Hamill), the film's antagonist, is an American former CIA officer working in Murmansk, who is also looking for the nuclear missile and joins Hamilton's team.

== Cast ==
- Peter Stormare as Carl Hamilton
- Lena Olin as Tessie
- Mark Hamill as Mike Hawkins
- Mats Långbacka as Åke Stålhandske
- Terry Carter as Texas Slim

== Production ==
The Statoil company paid 500,000 NOK ($USD67,000) for their logo to be displayed for three seconds in the film.
