= (More) So Much More =

Live album by Brett Dennen
- Released: 2007
- Genre: Folk
- Length: 30:56
- Label: Dualtone

Brett Dennen chronology
So Much More (2006)	(More) So Much More (2007)	Hope for the Hopeless (2008)

Professional ratings
Review scores
Source	Rating
AllMusic	3/5 stars

(More) So Much More is a live EP released by Brett Dennen following the release of his second studio album So Much More. It includes several prominent songs from the previous album as well as a cover version of a Bob Marley song.

== Track listing ==
All tracks are written by Brett Dennen, except where noted.

No.	Title	Length
1.	"Ain't No Reason" (Live at Paste)	4:01
2.	"She's Mine" (Live at Paste)	4:07
3.	"There is So Much More" (Live at Paste)	5:16
4.	"Darlin' Do Not Fear" (Live at Fingerprints)	5:10
5.	"The One Who Loves You the Most" (Live at Fingerprints)	7:29
6.	"Could You Be Loved" (Bob Marley, Live)	4:57
Total length:		30:56
