= Songs for Survival =

Amazon - Tribe - Songs for Survival

Studio album by Various artists
- Released: 15 September 2008 (digital); 13 October 2008 (CD)
- Recorded: 2005–2008
- Genre: Experimental
- Length: 88:35
- Label: Kensaltown Records
- Producers: Martin Terefe (Executive producer); Molly Oldfield (Executive producer) and others

Bruce Parry Presents Amazon - Tribe - Songs for Survival is a double album released by Kensaltown Records in support of a tribal peoples charity.

== Background ==
The album was released in support of Survival International, the human rights organisation for tribal peoples. The themes of the album are life around the Amazon River and other remote tribal areas. These topics are covered in the Bruce Parry television series Tribe and Amazon. All of the music on the album is exclusive and was written for the project. Many of the songs on the record contain samples recorded by Bruce Parry whilst living with tribal communities. The first track on the album by supergroup Apparatjik was used for the credits roll on the BBC series Amazon with Bruce Parry.

The album was released digitally on 15 September 2008, which was also the debut of the Amazon series on BBC 2, and then on 13 October on CD. It is available from retailers such as iTunes, Play.com and Amazon.co.uk.

Every track on the album is exclusive, and was written especially for the project. Around £45,000 has been raised for Survival International through album purchases.

The album was put together by Molly Oldfield, daughter of musician Mike Oldfield. She and Bruce Parry took samples from all the tribes (taken from BBC's Tribe) and sent them all the musicians involved on the project. Each one chose their favourite sample around which to write a song. Other musicians preferred to write a straightforward song without using the samples but all are inspired by the issues facing indigenous communities all over the world. The first track to be received was by Hot Chip (Molly was at Oxford University with Joe Goddard) who sampled music from the Babongo tribe in Gabon, Africa. Mike Oldfield's "Song for Survival" was composed in 2007, he sampled the islanders of Anuta singing in church, this was the second track to be received for the project.

== Apparatjik ==
"Ferreting", the theme to Amazon, is performed by Apparatjik, a supergroup composed of Guy Berryman, Magne Furuholmen, Jonas Bjerre (of Coldplay, a-ha and Mew respectively) and Martin Terefe. This was the first release by the group who have now released two full albums.

== Track listing ==
=== Amazon ===
1. Apparatjik - "Ferreting" (4:49)
2. Dawn Kinnard - "Love is My New Drug" (3:17)
3. will.i.am feat. the Babongo tribe - "One People" (2:50)
4. KT Tunstall - "The Hidden Heart" (4:23)
5. Jason Mraz & Brett Dennen - "Long Road to Forgiveness" (4:11)
6. Jeremy Warmsley ft. Mystery Jets & Adem - "Grains of Sand" (4:00)
7. Tom Baxter - "Make a Stand" (3:33)
8. Johnny Borrell feat. the Suri tribe - "Carrikfergus" (3:35)
9. Skin/Robot Club/Ian Matthews feat. the Adi tribe - "Simmer Down" (4:04)
10. Yusuf Islam - "Edge of Existence" (4:17)

=== Tribe ===
(Songs using tribal samples collected by Bruce Parry on his travels)

1. Joe Goddard feat. the Babongo tribe (Hot Chip Remix) - "Babongo Tribe Remix" (6:04)
2. Adam Freeland feat. the Suri tribe - "KIN" (5:00)
3. Hybrid feat. the Suri tribe - "Komuru" (5:55)
4. Roger Sanchez feat. The Adi Tribe – "Noneya" (7:51)
5. The Egg ft Various tribes - "Trails and Tribulations" (5:11)
6. The Go! Team feat. the Babongo tribe - "Templates from Home" (3:10)
7. The Ruby Suns feat. the Penan tribe - "Don't Touch the Dusty Fruit" (3:50)
8. Blue States feat. the Kombai tribe - "Hello Kombai" (4:04)
9. Way Out West feat. the Babongo tribe - "Evelina" (4:27)
10. Mike Oldfield feat. the Anuta tribe - "Song for Survival" (4:04)
