= Applied Art Forms =

Fashion label

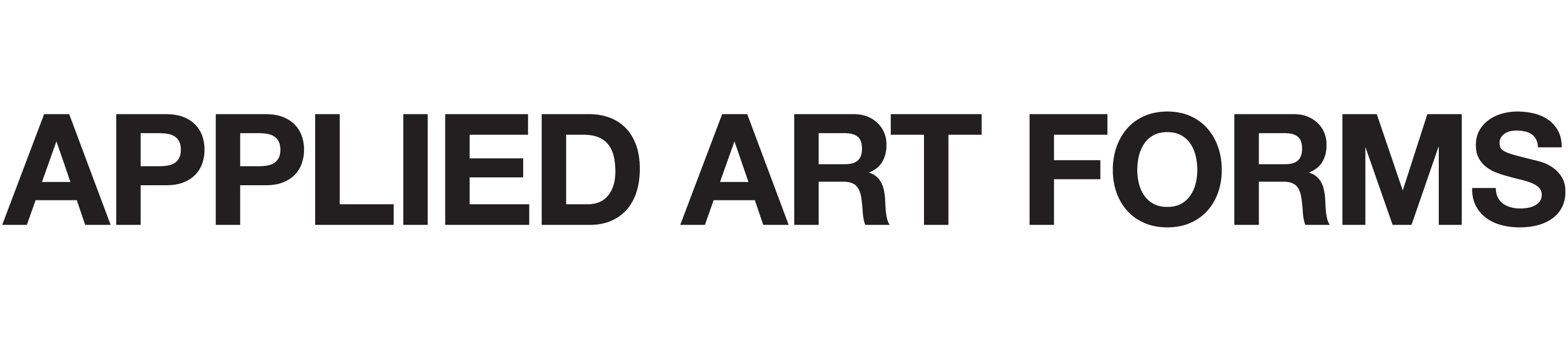
- Trade name: Ratino Limited
- Industry: Fashion
- Founded: October 2020; 5 years ago
- Founder: Guy Berryman
- Headquarters: Amsterdam, Netherlands
- Area served: Various
- Products: Clothing; jewellery
- Website: appliedartforms.com

Applied Art Forms (stylised in all caps and abbreviated as A/A/F) is a fashion brand based in Amsterdam, Netherlands. It was founded by Scottish musician Guy Berryman in October 2020, following three years of development. He assumed design and creative direction roles along with Marcel Verheijen, taking cues from vintage, utilitarian, military and workwear clothing. Product distribution started online and gradually expanded through retail companies such as Dover Street Market. Fashion outlets have praised the brand for developing minimalist and adaptable pieces. Despite being originally tailored for male bodies, they are marketed as unisex.

== History ==
Applied Art Forms was launched in October 2020, after Scottish musician Guy Berryman transformed his archive of vintage clothes into the basis for the first collection. He spend three years developing the brand, which operates under Ratino Limited. The headquarters and main studio were established in Amsterdam, Netherlands, because of his contacts in the region. Berryman is responsible for both design and creative direction, sharing the former position with Marcel Verheijen. Marketing began through a website selling clothes to friends, subsequently evolving to larger campaigns. These involved music playlists curated by special guests. Rather than following the traditional fashion calendar, the brand has a permanent catalogue with occasional updates and additions. Between 2021 and 2024, its distribution expanded to physical stores in cities such as Tokyo, Singapore, and London via Dover Street Market. Applied Art Forms has collaborated with retail in Berlin, Los Angeles, and Milan as well. In July 2025, the brand ran a Paris Fashion Week showroom. Its flagship store opened four months later in Amsterdam. In March 2026, Berryman stated that he would step down as creative director.

== Design ==
Berryman studied mechanical engineering and architecture at University College London before dropping out to pursue music with Coldplay, providing a background "adjacent to product design". He described his creative process as reimagining functional garments from the 1940s–1960s with an inclination for Japanese streetwear silhouettes, resulting in oversized, wide-bodied and loose-fitting clothes. Most of his archive includes utilitarian, military and workwear pieces. Designers such as Nigel Cabourn, Helmut Lang, Martin Margiela and Raf Simons have been mentioned among his references on several occasions. Although items are tailored to the male body, Applied Art Forms ultimately switched its presentation to unisex. The company prioritises longevity, sourcing durable and natural materials.

Core garments include the AM2-1 Modular Parka, featuring detachable parts; the DM1-1 Japanese Cargo, inspired by Swedish dead stock trousers; and the WU1-4 Parachute Bag, made from military parachutes. In 2023, Applied Art Forms teamed up with Master & Dynamic to develop wireless headphones based on the Apollo missions. The brand also launched the Canal House Line, an artisanal collection tailored using antique textiles. Its signature piece is the C.H.L Boro Liner, a jacket woven in boro fabrics dating back to the 19th century. Berryman soon met English designer Hannah Martin. Their shared appreciation for industrial and punk aesthetics drove the creation of the Vanitas jewellery series. The products draw influence from their namesake paintings, which depict the fleeting nature of life through symbolism.

== Reception ==
Esquire's Finlay Renwick praised Applied Art Forms for avoiding "the usual pitfalls" of celebrity brands, since its garments have subtle colour palettes and few logos. Andrea Sacal mentioned that Berryman delivers "a fresh take on upcycled menswear" in a fashion article for Hypebeast. Emma Pradella from Mr Porter highlighted the adaptable design of the AM2-1 Modular Parka on her spring jacket guide. Writing for Numéro Netherlands, Marie-Pauline Cesari said that each Applied Art Forms piece reflects a commitment to durability and timelessness. She also commented that Berryman's knowledge of architecture, engineering and vintage clothing brings "a distinctive edge". In 2024, Robb Report ranked him among the best emerging designers in the world. His fellow Coldplay members are supportive of the brand, using it both personally and professionally. The shirt with the phrase "Love is the drug" achieved popularity after Chris Martin bought it. In 2025, Highsnobiety included Applied Art Forms on their list of best Dutch fashion brands.

== See also ==
- History of Western fashion
- List of World War II uniforms and clothing
