= Brett Dennen =

American musician

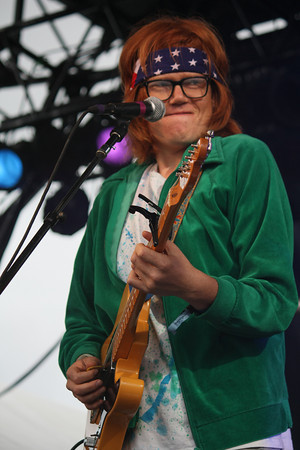
- Brett Dennen live in concert

Background information
- Born: Brett Michael Dennen; October 28, 1979 (age 47)
- Origin: Oakdale, California, U.S.
- Genre: Folk
- Occupation: Singer-songwriter
- Instrument: Guitar
- Years active: 2003–present
- Labels: Dualtone, F-Stop, Three Angels and a Saint, Atlantic
- Website: www.brettdennen.net

Brett Michael Dennen (born October 28, 1979) is an American folk/pop singer-songwriter from Central California. His seventh studio album, See the World, was released in July 2021.

== Early life ==
Dennen grew up in a small farming town in California's Central Valley; he was homeschooled. He spent much of his time learning to play music. After becoming proficient in the guitar, he began writing his own songs.

Dennen learned to play guitar while attending Camp Jack Hazard, a residential summer camp in the Sierra Nevada Mountains. His camp counselors played the music of Neil Young, John Denver, and Joni Mitchell, the same music that his parents listened to. As an adolescent, he worked there as a counselor. He has continued to help the camp, performing at a fundraiser in February 2012 for the Jack and Buena Foundation, which now runs Camp Jack Hazard.

He attended Oakdale High School, and, in 2002, graduated from the University of California, Santa Cruz. At the latter, he was a student at Kresge College, majoring in sociology and philosophy, with goals of becoming an educator, a teacher, or a community worker. He also led anti-smoking campaigns on campus. He also began writing music with friends, eventually establishing a jam band in which he played mandolin alongside an acoustic guitarist, bassist, hand drummer, and flutist. He found writing music that everyone would like, however, "stifling and overwhelming."

After graduating college and remaining in Santa Cruz, Dennen moved to Los Angeles to perform. In late 2003 and early 2004, he began to record his first album, which he self-released. A year after the album's release, Universal signed on as a distributor.

== Career ==
Dennen has been a part of The Mosaic Project, a San Francisco Bay Area–based nonprofit organization, since its inception.

In 2004, Dennen released his debut, self-titled album, Brett Dennen on an indie label, Three Angels and A Saint Records, produced by Dennen & Leslie Merical. Dennen eventually signed a record deal with Dualtone Records.

His second album, So Much More, includes the singles "Ain't No Reason", "She's Mine" and "Darlin' Do Not Fear".

Dennen also contributed a cover of "Private Life" to the 2006 tribute album Drink To Bones That Turn To Dust: A Toast To Oingo Boingo.

In an interview with American Songwriter magazine, Dennen acknowledged Paul Simon's significant influence on his music as well as commenting that Paul Simon's Graceland was one of his favorite albums.

Dennen opened for John Mayer on his tour in 2008.

In 2008, "Darlin' Do Not Fear," from So Much More, was featured in the award-winning independent film Sherman's Way.

Dennen was named by Rolling Stone magazine as an "Artist to Watch," and in 2008, Entertainment Weekly called him one of its eight "Guys on the Rise".

In 2008, Dennen, along with Jason Mraz, contributed the song "Long Road to Forgiveness" to the Survival International charity album Songs for Survival. Earlier in the fall, Dennen toured Australia with Pete Murray. In late October, Hope for the Hopeless, Dennen's third album, was released. The song "Ain't Gonna Lose You" was featured on Grey's Anatomy and topped the iTunes folk charts. The record reached No. 6 on the digital charts, and was followed by a successful mini-tour.

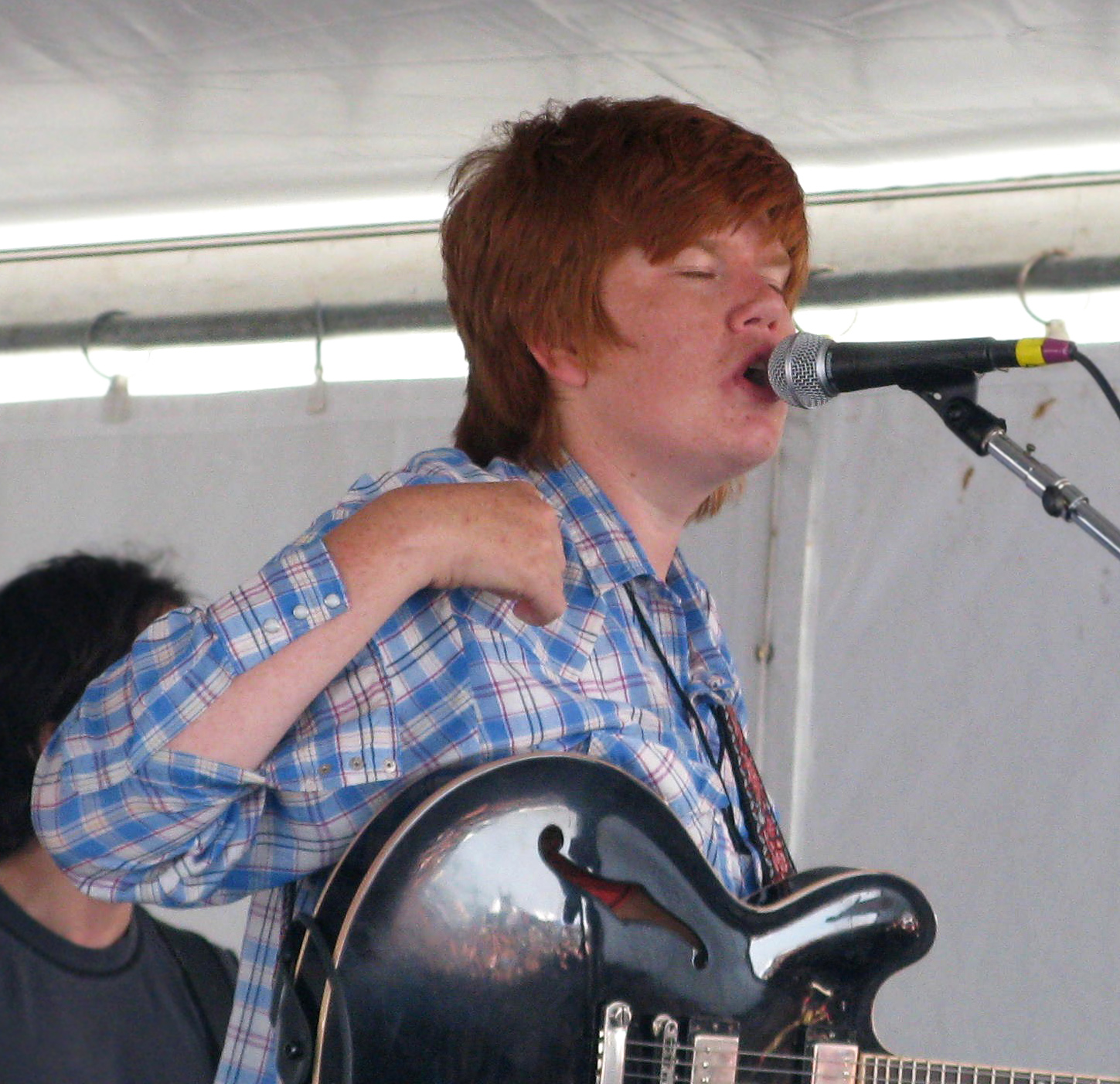
Dennen at Newport Folk Festival 2009

On August 1, 2009, Dennen performed at the Newport Folk Festival in Newport, Rhode Island.

On October 9, 2009, Dennen appeared on The Late Show with David Letterman. In 2010, Dennen played at the Oulipo Ballroom in Kentucky. He played a mixture of Paul Simon covers along with unreleased tracks from his upcoming album. His fourth album, Loverboy, was released on April 12, 2011. In 2009, Dennen's song "She's Mine" was featured on the soundtrack for the movie According to Greta; in 2010, Dennen's song "Darlin' Do Not Fear" was featured on the soundtrack for the TV show Parenthood.

Dennen's fifth album, Smoke and Mirrors, was released on October 22, 2013, along with its first single, "Wild Child." On October 24, "Sweet Persuasion" was featured on the TV show Parenthood.

"Comeback Kid (That's My Dog)" is the theme song on the NBC comedy About A Boy. The song was also used in the series finale of Wizards of Waverly Place.

On March 13, 2014, he appeared on episode 67 of Live From Daryl's House, performing "Only Want You", "Wild Child", "Right As Rain", "When We Were Young", "What's Gunna Happen To Us", and "Don't Mess With Karma" with Daryl Hall and his house band.

In 2016, Dennen released his sixth studio album, Por Favor.

In January 2018, Dennen released a new single, "Already Gone." That same year, he released two EPs "simply to change it up." The EP Here's Looking at You Kid?, a song that he says is about "life," was originally inspired by his loyal fans over the years, but began to include his personal speculation about what fatherhood might be like.

== Influences ==
Dennen counts "great songwriters" like Paul Simon, Cat Stevens, and Van Morrison among his biggest influences. Among his favorite albums are Paul Simon's Graceland, Tom Petty's Wildflowers, Van Morrison's Veedon Fleece, the first Crosby Stills and Nash album, and Cat Stevens' album Buddha and the Chocolate Box.

== Discography ==
=== Albums ===
==== Studio albums ====
- Brett Dennen (2003)
- So Much More (2006)
- Hope for the Hopeless (2008)
- Loverboy (2011)
- Smoke and Mirrors (2013)
- Por Favor (2016)
- See the World (2021)
- If It Takes Forever (2024)

==== Live albums and EPs ====
- Peace EP (2006)
- (More) So Much More (2007)
- Live Sessions EP (iTunes exclusive) (2009)
- Let's... (2018)
- Here's Looking at You Kid (2018)

=== Singles ===
List of singles as lead artist, with selected chart positions
Title	Year	Peak chart positions	Album
Title	Year	US AAA	Album
"Ain't No Reason"	2006	—	So Much More
"She's Mine"	2007	26	So Much More
"Make You Crazy"	2008	5	Hope for the Hopeless
"Heaven"	2009	—	Hope for the Hopeless
"Sydney (I'll Come Running)"	2011	17	Loverboy
"Comeback Kid"	2011	8	Loverboy
"Wild Child"	2013	5	Smoke and Mirrors
"Out of My Head"	2014	—	Smoke and Mirrors
"When We Were Young"	2014	25	Smoke and Mirrors
"Cassidy"	2016	30	Por Favor
"Already Gone"	2018	3	Let's.../Here's Looking at You Kid
"Here's Looking at You Kid"	2018	17	Let's.../Here's Looking at You Kid
"See the World"	2021	4	See the World
"Paul Newman Daytona Rolex"	2021	39	See the World
"—" denotes singles that did not chart or were not released

=== Other contributions ===
- Children's Songs for Peace and a Better World (2003)
- Drink to Bones That Turn to Dust: A Toast to Oingo Boingo (2006)
- Don't Think Twice, It's Alright – Ted Lennon & Brett Dennen (2007)
- CLIF GreenNotes Protect the Places We Play (2008) Find It Here
- Songs for Survival (2008)
- Parenthood (television soundtrack) (2010)
- The Protector [USA Network] (2011)
- "You Ain't Goin' Nowhere" for "Chimes of Freedom: Songs of Bob Dylan Honoring 50 Years of Amnesty International" (2012)
- "Colours" for "Gazing With Tranquility – A Tribute to Donovan" (2015)
