= Ardis Fagerholm =

Dominican-Swedish singer

Ardis
- Born: Ardis Hemezida Fagerholm; 8 March 1971 (age 55)
- Genres: Pop; Dance; Dance-pop; Synthpop; Electronica
- Occupation: Singer-songwriter
- Instrument: Vocals
- Years active: 1993–1998
- Label: Stockholm Records

Ardis Fagerholm (born 8 March 1971) is a Dominican-Swedish pop singer.

== Biography ==
At the age of thirteen Ardis moved from the West Indian island Dominica to settle down in Sweden. Growing up on Motown and gospel-influenced American music, Ardis started writing songs and lyrics.

In 1991, the American singer/arranger, Jon Berger, teamed with Ardis' to record her first demo. In 1992, Stockholm Records signed Ardis kicking her musical career into high gear. A collaboration with producer Anders Hansson which resulted in the debut album Love Addict in 1994. The Swedish audience first got acquainted with Ardis after the release of her version of the classic "Ain't Nobody's Business". However, Ardis' big break was "Shotgun", a song which was chosen as the theme on the soundtrack to the Swedish film Vendetta. "Shotgun" became Ardis' second hit single and her break through in the charts.

The album Love Addict was released at the end of 1994. All songs on the album were written by Ardis, with the exception of "Ain't Nobody's Business". The album went gold shortly after its release and Ardis was nominated for a Grammis, the Swedish equivalent of the Grammy Awards. A tour started in late '94 and continued in to '95. The extensive tour gave audiences the opportunity to get familiar with the stage personality of Ardis, a personality that caught the fascination of the Swedish media. Her vibrant live performances and quiet lifestyle became fuel for further interest and mystique around Ardis.

In September 1996, Ardis released a single, "Dirty", taken from the album Woman, which was released in October. Every song on Woman has Ardis' signature on the songwriting credit. The production work is, as on Love Addict, done by Anders Hansson. However, this time no less than four producers were involved. About Woman, Ardis said that "The songs are more varied and connected".

In 1998, Ardis released a single "No Man's Land" which was a soundtrack to the film Hamilton. After that film track, she withdrew from the public eye and only appeared as a guest vocalist on Commonly Unique with The Real Group in 2000 and Merit Hemmingsons album En Plats I Skogen in 2002.

== Albums ==
- Love Addict 1994
- Woman 1996
