= Bruce Parry =

British documentary creator (born 1969)

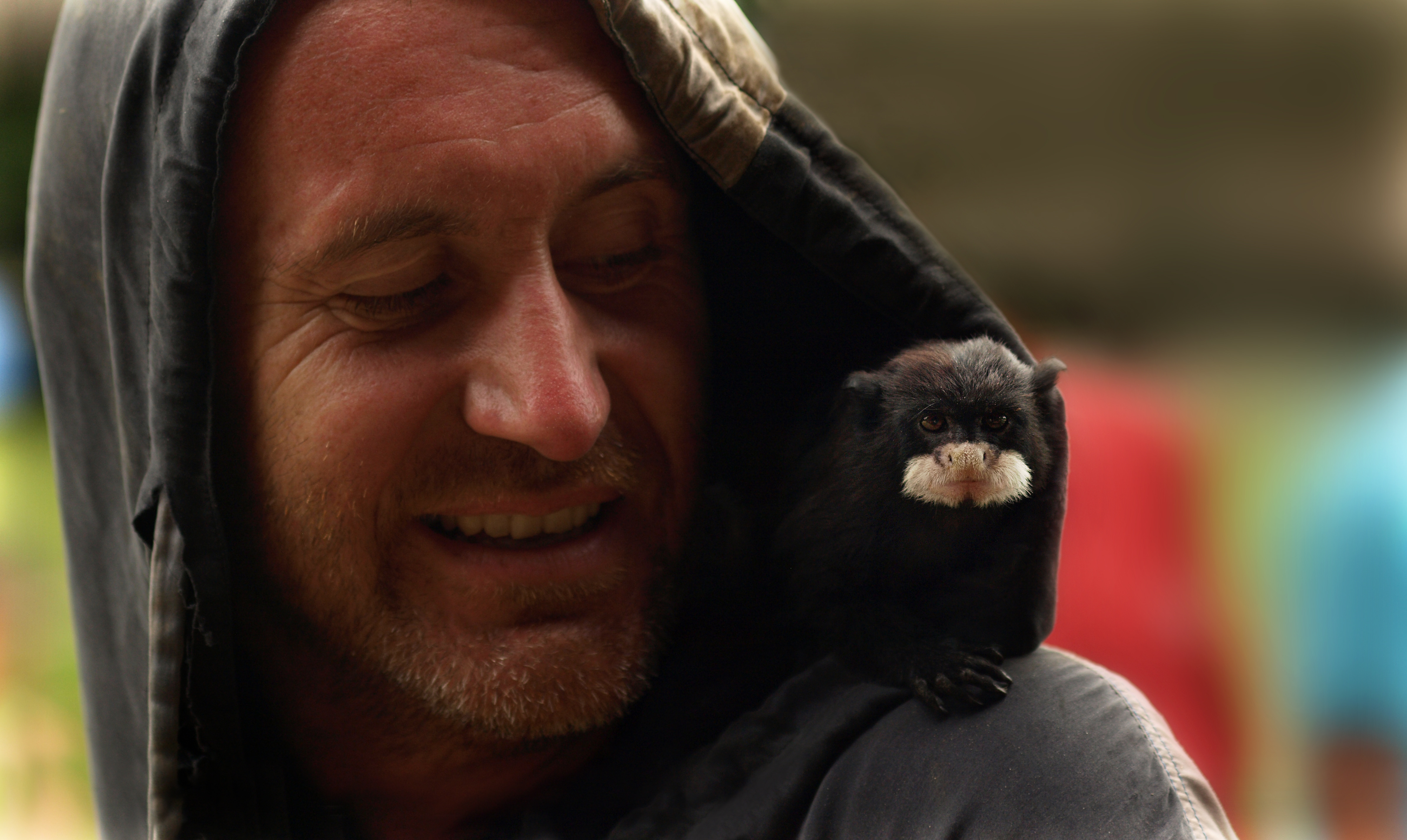
- Parry with a marmoset in 2008
- Born: Bruce Roland Crombie Parry; 17 March 1969 (age 57); Hythe, Hampshire, England
- Occupations: Film director, television presenter, author
- Years active: 2002–present
- Known for: Explorer, Royal Marine

Bruce Parry (born 17 March 1969) is an English documentarian, indigenous rights advocate, author, explorer, trek leader and former Royal Marines commando officer. He employs an ethnographic style and a form of participant observation for his documentaries.

His documentary series for the BBC entitled Tribe, Amazon, and Arctic have shown Parry exploring extreme environments, living with remote indigenous peoples and highlighting many of the important issues being faced on the environmental frontline.

== Early life ==
Parry was born in Hythe, Hampshire, into a devoutly Christian and military family from Dorset with his father being a Major in the Royal Artillery. He attended the Wells Cathedral School as a boarder between 1978 and 1987 and was Head of House, a Combined Cadet Force cadet.

== Military career ==
After finishing at Wells Cathedral School Parry entered the Royal Marines and successfully completed training at the Royal Marines Commando Training Centre in Devon. He was then selected by the Admiralty Interview Board and commissioned as a Second Lieutenant at the age of 18.

He served as a Troop Commander in Comacchio Group and Commando Logistic Regiment and was deployed to Norway. Parry was deployed to Iraq and he served in a security and humanitarian capacity in Iraqi Kurdistan for Operation Provide Comfort during and after the First Gulf War. He then specialised as Physical Training Instructor. At 23 years old, he became the youngest officer ever to be made Head of Fitness and Training for the Royal Marines Commando Training Centre. Bruce Parry left the service as a Lieutenant after six years.

== Trekking career ==
After retiring from the Royal Marines, Parry studied physical education and sports science at Loughborough University but then deferred. He then began working as a trek leader for various scientific and conservation expeditions throughout Indonesia. He also worked as an expedition leader for Trekforce. He personally organized and led more than 15 major expeditions to extreme parts of the world.

He then worked in the British film and music industry. He worked as a runner and then location manager for music videos, television commercials and feature films. Parry eventually founded his own company entitled Endeavour Productions.

== Television career ==
Parry first appeared on television in 2002 in an episode of BBC1's Extreme Lives series entitled "Cannibals and Crampons". He planned, filmed, directed and presented the documentary episode with his friend Mark Anstice. The film was a first-hand account of their successful journey to climb Puncak Mandala in the Indonesian part of New Guinea. It is the second highest mountain of Australasia but is little known and rarely climbed.

Parry was chosen in 2002 to lead the Children's BBC expedition show Serious Jungle, taking four boys and four girls aged 11 to 15 to Borneo to work with orangutans. The show won the 2003 Royal Television Society Award for Best Children's Factual. Also in 2002 Parry appeared as the straight-faced instructor in three episodes of Danger! 50,000 Volts! opposite Nick Frost.

The following year he made a return to the BBC1's Extreme Lives series and made a programme with Debra Searle about a 700 km canoe race down the Yukon River in Canada entitled "Yukon Quest". The same year he returned to the Children's BBC to lead a trek for Serious Desert taking a group of children to Namibia's Skeleton Coast to work with the endangered black rhino. The show won the BAFTA Award for Best Children's Factual in 2004.

In 2004, Parry started filming the prime time BBC2 documentary series Tribe in which he lived with various tribal groups exactly as they do to better understand their culture. The first series of Tribe saw Parry living with indigenous peoples in Gabon, India, Indonesia, Ethiopia, Mongolia and Venezuela.

Next Parry was chosen to lead an expedition across Greenland in the guise of Captain Scott for a period remake of Scott's fateful last trip to the South Pole entitled Blizzard: Race to the Pole in 2006.

The second series of Tribe was filmed wholly in Ethiopia as a journey between three different tribal groups. The third series was filmed in Brazil, Polynesia, Siberia, Bhutan, Tanzania and Malaysia.

In 2008, Parry journeyed for seven and a half months through Peru and Brazil for his series entitled Amazon where he looked at such issues as cocaine, oil, logging, slavery, dams, soya, cattle ranching and epidemics. He spent time with government officials, indigenous peoples, illegal loggers, drug manufacturers and cattle ranchers.

In 2010, over the course of one bright Arctic summer, Parry immersed himself in the lives of people living in the Far North and in 2011 released a book about his travels. From the Inuit of Greenland to Alaska whalers and gold-diggers, Canadian oil-men, scientists and bands of reindeer herders in the remote valleys of Siberia, Parry encountered first-hand the threats to culture, landscape and wildlife of the Arctic.

== Film career ==
Since finishing Arctic for the BBC, Parry directed and produced his debut feature documentary for the big screen, TAWAI – A voice from the forest, released in 2017. The film takes a deeper look into some of the issues touched upon within his television programmes and the personal lessons which he has learnt from his explorations.

== Indigenous rights ==
Parry is a supporter of the indigenous rights organisation Survival International. He put together a double album of twenty exclusive new songs from KT Tunstall, Johnny Borrell, A-ha, the Black Eyed Peas, Hot Chip and more. The album is called Bruce Parry presents: Amazon/Tribe – Songs for Survival. The first track on the album 'Ferreting' by supergroup 'Apparatjik' (who are releasing their own album later on, the band is made up of members of Coldplay, MEW, and A-ha) is used as the theme music for Amazon. The record label is Kensaltown Records and all profits go to Survival International.

In a video for Survival about the recording of the album, Songs for Survival, Parry speaks on the importance of raising awareness for indigenous rights. He believes that if people understood the negative impact that our culture of greed and consumerism has on the 'wonderful people' at the other end, they would act differently.

In 2007 a spokesperson for Survival International praised the positive effects of Parry and his documentaries, noting that the "programmes bring tribal peoples vividly to life. Bruce Parry's interest in them and his respect for their ways of life come across very strongly. We believe that public awareness and the force of public opinion is absolutely crucial in ensuring that tribal peoples' rights are respected."

== Spirituality ==
Parry was brought up as a Christian but his experiences among the tribes initially led him towards a sceptical form of pandeism (as opposed to pantheism):

"When I came back from expeditions, I had some experiences that made me readdress all that. I'd pretty much known all along that Christianity wasn't for me. Ever since then, I've been on my own quest to find another truth. I can't read novels, but I do read books about cosmology, about astrophysics, about genetics. I'm interested in altered states of mind, and creation myths. It's all part of the same thing – I want to know why we think what we think. Now, I'd describe myself as pan-deist, reluctantly verging on atheist."

== Awards ==
In 2007, Parry received Royal Television Society Award for Best Presenter for Tribe. In 2008 he received the BAFTA Cymru Award for Best On-Screen Presenter for Tribe and his second Royal Television Society Award for Best Presenter for Amazon. He also won the BAFTA award for Factual Series in 2009. His documentaries have also won a number of awards from various film festivals around the world.

== Filmography ==
- Extreme Lives (2002)
- Serious Jungle (2002)
- Extreme Lives (2003)
- Serious Desert (2003)
- Tribe (Three series – 2005, 2006, 2007)
- Blizzard-Race to the Pole (2006)
- Amazon (2008)
- Arctic (2011)
- TAWAI – A voice from the forest (2017)
- Tribe with Bruce Parry (2025)

== Publications ==
- Tribe, by Bruce Parry (Penguin, 2007), ISBN 978-0-7181-4918-5
- Amazon, by Bruce Parry (Penguin, 2008), ISBN 978-0-7181-5434-9
- Arctic, by Bruce Parry with Huw Lewis-Jones (Conway, 2011), ISBN 978-1-84486-130-9
