= We Are Here (Apparatjik album) =

Studio album by Apparatjik
- Released: 1 February 2010
- Recorded: Mid-2008 – January 2010
- Genre: Experimental rock, alternative rock, electronic rock, indie rock, art pop
- Length: 41:58
- Label: Meta Merge Un
- Producer: Apparatjik

Apparatjik chronology
We Are Here (2010)	Square Peg in a Round Hole (2012)

Singles from We Are Here
- 1. "Electric Eye" Released: 30 November 2009; 2. "Antlers / Electric Eye" Released: 8 February 2010; 3. "Datascroller" Released: 19 July 2010

Professional ratings
Review scores
Source	Rating
AnyDecentMusic?	(7.6)
BBC	very positive
InYourSpeakers	(64/100)
MusicOMH	3.5/5 stars
Noize Makes Enemies	mixed
One Thirty BPM	7/10 stars
QRO Magazine	(7.7/10.0)
The Line of Best Fit	3.5/5 stars

We Are Here is the debut studio album by rock supergroup Apparatjik and was released first on 1 February 2010 for digital download via their official website. A physical CD/DVD release followed and the album was re-released for iTunes, with bonus material, on 15 June 2010.

The album was once again re-released on 14 November 2010 on yellow 12" vinyl with an alternate sleeve and a poster, limited to 260 copies.

== Background ==
The first single from the album, "Electric Eye", was released for digital download on 30 November 2009. The song was released again as a double-A-side single with "Antlers" for 7 inch vinyl on 8 February 2010. Apparatjik's first song to be played on BBC Radio 1 was a radio edit of "Datascroller", which aired on 14 June 2010. This was released as the third single on 19 July 2010 as a download only.

The album cover artwork is derived from a diagram related to spacetime theories in the field of special relativity within physics, and follows with the band's overall image as being a "species of their own from another planet".

== Track listing ==
All tracks are written by Apparatjik.

No.	Title	Length
1.	"Deadbeat"	2:52
2.	"Datascroller"	2:58
3.	"Snow Crystals"	4:32
4.	"Supersonic Sound"	3:24
5.	"Arrow And Bow"	4:20
6.	"In A Quiet Corner"	3:35
7.	"Josie"	3:30
8.	"Antlers"	3:20
9.	"Electric Eye"	6:02
10.	"Look Kids"	4:52
11.	"Quiz Show"	2:33
Total length:		41:58

Bonus DVD (You Are There)
No.	Title	Length
1.	"Electric Eye (music video)"	6:03
2.	"You Are Here"	0:33
3.	"Magne Furuholmen: Eye On Committee Bulletin"	0:44
4.	"Guy Berryman: Frozen Fingers"	6:10
5.	"Martin Terefe: Was It You?"	5:22
6.	"Nefgro"	0:38
7.	"Four Can Keep a Secret V1"	4:16
8.	"Four Can Keep a Secret V2"	4:15
9.	"Four Can Keep a Secret V3"	4:17
10.	"Jonas Bjerre: Datascroller"	2:40
11.	"Antlers (music video)"	3:15
12.	"Datascroller (music video)"	3:04
13.	"Granule No.8"	1:19
14.	"Supersonic Sound (music video)"	3:37
15.	"Arrow And Bow (music video)"	4:14
16.	"untitled"	0:20
17.	"APPARAT K"	1:01
18.	"untitled"	0:59
19.	"untitled"	1:28
20.	"untitled"	0:06
21.	"Snow Crystals (live at Club Transmediale, Berlin)"	3:26
22.	"Arrow And Bow (live at Club Transmediale, Berlin)"	4:00
23.	"Intermission (live at Club Transmediale, Berlin)"	1:25
24.	"Quiz Show (live at Club Transmediale, Berlin)"	2:31
25.	"Deadbeat (live at Club Transmediale, Berlin)"	9:59
Total length:		75:42

Bonus tracks (Standard version)
No.	Title	Length
1.	"One Less Thing to Worry About"	4:26
2.	"4 Can Keep A Secret If 3 Of Them Are Dead"	4:13
3.	"Frozen Fingers"	5:43
Total length:		14:22

Bonus videos (Deluxe version)
No.	Title	Length
1.	"Antlers"
2.	"Electric Eye"
3.	"Snow Crystals (CTM Mash up)"
4.	"Supersonic Sound"
5.	"Datascroller (the film)"

== Personnel ==
Apparatjik

- Jonas Bjerre – lead vocals, guitar
- Magne Furuholmen – vocals, guitar, keyboards
- Guy Berryman – vocals, bass
- Martin Terefe – vocals, drums, production
