= Serious (TV series) =

- Serious Ocean logo
- Starring: Bruce Parry; Emma Jay; Ben Major; Polly Murray
- Narrated by: Kate Gerbeau (2002); Fearne Cotton (2003–2007); Sophie Okonedo (2008–2011); Steve Backshall (2011)
- Country of origin: United Kingdom
- Original language: English
- No. of series: 8

Original release
- Network: CBBC
- Release: 23 December 2002 – 7 December 2011

Serious, Serious Explorers in later series, is an observational documentary series made by the BBC and broadcast as part of their children's programming. It encompasses Serious Jungle (2002), Serious Desert (2003), Serious Arctic (2005), Serious Amazon (2006), Serious Andes (2007), Serious Ocean (2008) and two series of Serious Explorers (2011).

Serious Ocean consisted of ten 30-minute episodes, while each previous series was six 30-minute episodes. In each series a group of eight 12- to 15-year-olds embark on an expedition to an extreme part of the world, in order to help wildlife or assist in environmental projects. The programmes have won numerous awards, among them honours from BAFTA and the Royal Television Society.

== Series guide ==
=== Serious Jungle (2002) ===
The series (then known as Extreme Challenge) was first announced by Nigel Pickard, Controller of CBBC, on 19 November 2001. Serious Jungle was aired around Christmas 2002 and New Year 2003. Chosen from 1,000 applicants, eight adventurers faced a mission to build a feeding platform in the heart of the Borneo jungle, to help return orangutans to the wild (many of them rescued after being illegally kept as pets). They were in the rainforest for three weeks, with the series being filmed in August 2002. The Serious Jungle eight were accompanied by expedition leaders Bruce Parry and Emma Jay.

Serious Jungle Adventurers
Adventurer	Age	Location
Daniel Harrison	12	St. Helens, Merseyside
Imogen Forbes	13	London
Hannah Davis	15	Sidcup, Kent
J.C. Lee	14	Nantwich, Cheshire
Laura Baker	14	Berkhamsted, Hertfordshire
Luke Gibson	14	Basildon, Essex
Susan Wokoma	14	London
Larry Downing	15	Robertsbridge, East Sussex

Larry gave an interview in 2007, giving advice to those about to apply for Serious Ocean, as well as some advice for successful applicants.

=== Serious Desert (2003) ===
Serious Desert aired from 20 to 31 October 2003. After 6,500 applications, eight adventurers were chosen to travel to Namibia and try and save the endangered black rhinoceros. They sleep under tarpaulin in the dunes and see black rhinos, but also wildebeest, zebra, springbok, giraffes, jackals, snakes, scorpions and elephants. Filming from 13 April to 5 May 2003, they build a new camel enclosure and finally make an epic fifty mile trek across the Namibian sand dunes to the Skeleton Coast. Returning from the previous series, Bruce Parry and Emma Jay were the expedition leaders who led the team.

Serious Desert Adventurers
Adventurer	Age	Location
Ellie	13 (Note: Ellie celebrated her 14th birthday during the expedition.)	London
Holly	13	Bristol
Martin	14	London
Chris	14	Devon
Perry	14	Sunderland
Promise	13	London
Aimee	15	Belfast, Northern Ireland
David	15	Edinburgh, Scotland

Along with Larry from the previous series, Promise was interviewed in 2007, giving her opinion on what it was like to have the cameras following her around on the expedition.

=== Serious Arctic (2005) ===
Serious Arctic aired from 5 February to 6 March 2005. Chosen from 9,000 applicants, eight adventurers flew to Baffin Island, Canada, where they made an attempt to track polar bears across the pack ice, riding on husky sleds, with the season being filmed from 4 to 24 April 2004. Blizzards made the trip a hazard, and they spent most of one week in their tents. Serious Arctic was also the most successful Serious series picking up five awards. The expedition leaders for this trip were Ben Major and Emma Jay.

Serious Arctic Adventurers
Adventurer	Age	Location
Adam	12 (Note: Adam and Fabian both celebrated their 13th birthdays during the expedition.)	Liverpool
Fabian Rivers	12	Birmingham
Courtenay Hamilton	14	Vale of Glamorgan, Wales
Alex	14	Sheffield
Emily	14	Altrincham, Greater Manchester
Jennielyn Musk	15	Essex
Lewis	15	London
Matt Johnson	15	Ringwood, Bournemouth

=== Serious Amazon (2006) ===
Serious Amazon aired from 25 February to 26 March 2006, and had a then-record of 29,000 12- to 15-year-olds auditioning for a part. The chosen team of eight left for Peru on 9 July 2005, with a mission to help rare uakari monkeys and pink river dolphins caught in illegal fishing nets in the Amazon River. The team of eight removed the illegal fishing nets to leave the dolphins safe, and also built habitats for the bald uakari. The season finished filming on 29 July. The Serious Amazon eight were accompanied by expedition leaders Ben Major and Polly Murray.

Serious Amazon Adventurers
Adventurer	Age	Location
Beth	15	Essex
Georgia	13	Derby
Jamie	15	Gwent, Wales
Matt	14	Liverpool
Cally	13	Edinburgh, Scotland
Simran	14	Berkshire
Jonathan	13	London
Sam	14	Edinburgh, Scotland

=== Serious Andes (2007) ===
Serious Andes aired from 4 June to 20 August 2007 and followed eight adventurers who, after being chosen from a then-record 36,000 12-to-15-year-olds, travelled to Ecuador to build an enclosure for spectacled bears. They also set out to climb the Cotopaxi volcano, the youngest team ever to have done so. Only four of the adventurers (Erin, Kylie, Will and Caitlin) were able to conquer the volcano, as the other four adventurers (Sarah, Liam, Matt and Joshua) were unable to do so, with some succumbing to early symptoms of acute mountain sickness. The season was filmed between 12 July and 3 August 2006. The Serious Andes eight were again accompanied by leaders Ben Major and Polly Murray. There was also a special episode that featured behind the scenes moments in the making of Serious Andes, called Serious Andes: Extra.

Serious Andes Adventurers
Adventurer	Age	Location
Joshua	12	Twickenham, Middlesex
Will	15	High Wycombe, Buckinghamshire
Matt	14	Addlestone, Surrey
Liam	14	London, England
Caitlin Brennan	13	Garnethill, Glasgow
Erin Fulton	15	Bo'ness, Scotland
Kylie Mautenyane	15	Middlesbrough
Sarah	15	London

=== Serious Ocean (2008) ===
Serious Ocean was filmed in November and December 2007 featuring eight adventurers travelling to the isolated coast of Chile, living on a boat, assisting research into penguins, dolphins and albatrosses before moving on to assist in the survey of Glacier Chloe, the most southerly glacier outside Antarctica. The highlight of the trip, however, was when they sailed around Cape Horn, becoming one of the youngest teams ever to do so. The Serious Ocean eight were once again accompanied by expedition leaders Ben Major and Polly Murray. The series was first aired in July 2008.

A book of the series was released during December 2007, entitled Serious Survival: How to Poo in the Arctic and Other Essential Tips, owing to the success of its broadcasting history. Written by the Series Producer Marshall Corwin, Serious Survival was shortlisted for the prestigious Royal Society Junior Science Books Prize.

Serious Ocean Adventurers
Adventurer	Age	Location
Harry	13	Lancashire
Katie Barclay	13	Kilmarnock, Ayrshire, Scotland
Callum Kenny	14	Colton, Leeds
Robyn	12 (Note: Robyn celebrated her 13th birthday at the beginning of the trip.)	Woodley, Berkshire
Charlotte	13	Clwyd, Wales
Conor	15	Liverpool
Sybil	14	London
David	15	London

=== Serious Explorers: Livingstone (2009–2011) ===
Initially, the next Serious series was to be filmed in China, and would have followed the journey of 13th-century explorer, Marco Polo, including joining a camel train in the Taklamakan Desert, climbing mountains, and spending time with local tribes. However, after travelling to the region, due to political unrest Serious Explorers was postponed and the team returned to the UK. The series was later rescheduled to film in Tanzania in Africa at the end of 2009, where the team would follow in the foot steps of explorer David Livingstone.

Applications were accepted through January 2009. Around 900 of the applicants, from over 14,000, had a phone interview before 120 were selected to go to London, Bristol or Manchester for a day of auditions. 16 were selected to go to Wales for a selection weekend until it was cut down to the final 8. However, another contestant was removed for having to undergo an emergency tonsil operation, narrowing down the field to seven. Eventually, seven contestants aged 12–15 (four boys and three girls) were selected to take part in the show. The expedition took place in late 2009, with the intention of broadcasting the series in early 2010.

However, during filming, expedition guide Anton Turner died when he was mauled by an elephant on 30 October 2009, and production was reported to have ceased. Despite this, the series began broadcasting as Serious Explorers: Livingstone in February 2011. During the expedition three of the most promising of the seven explorers were chosen to cross the Mbarika mountain range, while the remaining four stayed behind to build an enclosure to fend off lions in a village; in the final episode, having come close to their target, the death of Anton was reported, who had gone out in advance of the day's trek over Mbarika to ensure the walk would be safe. Expedition leader Ben immediately called a halt to the Mbarika trek, and the series ended. Anton was posthumously awarded the Queen's Gallantry Medal in 2012.

=== Serious Explorers: Raleigh (2011) ===
In late 2010, CBBC began to look for participants for a new Serious Explorers for production in early 2011 which followed the explorers led by Walter Raleigh sailing from Trinidad and Tobago to Guyana. The applications were cut down from around 12,000 to 300, who were given phone auditions in late October. The next stage was a Skype audition which took place in early November. 105 people were picked to go to an audition in Manchester or London on 23 November 2010 (Manchester) and 25 November 2010 (London). 16 children were picked for a final auditions weekend in December, where the final eight were chosen. The final eight started their journey on 31 January 2011.

The series began broadcasting in September 2011 and finished broadcasting in late November 2011. There were 10 episodes and 1 special episode called Serious Survival which was aired on 7 December 2011.

Adventurer	Age	Location
Megan	13 (Note: Megan celebrated her 14th birthday during the expedition.)	England
Chanelle Houlder (Note: Chanelle left the expedition after 1 week due to allergic reactions to insect bites)	14	England
Nikita McArthur	12	England
Sammie Hatichavadi	13	Scotland
Michael Tyke Denton	14	England
Josh Morrison	14	Northern Ireland
Regan Wharton	13	England
Jake Bell	12	England

== Awards ==
The Serious show won several awards, including five British Academy Children's Awards in the Factual category: Serious Desert in 2004, Serious Arctic in 2005, Serious Andes in 2008, Serious Ocean in 2010 and Serious Amazon in 2006. The Royal Television Society has also given the series three awards; Best Children's Programme in 2002 for Serious Jungle, 2005 for Serious Arctic and 2007 for Serious Andes.

In addition, the Serious Arctic series won a 2006 Prix Jeunesse International (Children's Jury Prize), along with a Broadcast Award and a Bulldog Award.

Serious Ocean won the Maritime Media Award 2008, beating off competition from adult series such as the BBC's Trawlermen and Channel 5's Warship.

== International broadcast ==
So far only Serious Amazon, Serious Ocean and Serious Andes have been aired in Australia, on ABC1 and ABC3. The series has also been shown on Discovery Kids and The Hub, where five complete seasons have been shown. Slovenian television Kanal A has bought the rights to air Serious Amazon. The show airs Saturdays at 2:10 pm, under the title Vse o Amazonki (All About the Amazon).

The Italian television network RAI in early 2009 aired Serious Jungle, Serious Desert, Serious Arctic, Serious Amazon, and Serious Andes.
