= The Mosaic Project (organization) =

The Mosaic Project is an 501(c)(3) nonprofit organization that has been teaching peace and understanding to children in the San Francisco Bay Area since 2001.

== Curriculum ==
Various teaching methods are used, including kinesthetic learning. Students are taught self-respect and respect of others, as well as ethnic awareness. The pedagogy is supported by social science research.

== Outdoor School ==
The Outdoor School is a program for fourth and fifth grade students. During the duration of five days and four nights, students are exposed to diverse settings and experience racial integration firsthand. The program focuses on community and building self-esteem. It is well regarded by area parents.

== Staff ==
The year-round staff consists of the five individuals who oversee the organization. There is also a board of directors. The Mosaic Project works with over two dozen partner schools.

== Children Songs for Peace and a Better World ==
The Children's Songs for Peace and a Better World album is a compilation of songs written and performed by members of the Mosaic Project, including Brett Dennen. It has received a Children's Music Web 2004 Award as well as a Parent's Choice 2004 Approved Award. Songs from the CD have been aired on the KFOG and KPFA radio stations.
