= Loverboy (Brett Dennen album) =

Studio album by Brett Dennen
- Released: April 12, 2011
- Length: 42:41
- Label: Dualtone
- Producer: Brett Dennen; Martin Terefe

Brett Dennen chronology
Hope for the Hopeless (2008)	Loverboy (2011)	Smoke and Mirrors (2013)

Loverboy is the fourth studio album by the American singer-songwriter Brett Dennen. It was released on April 12, 2011. Dennen co-produced the album with Martin Terefe.

== Reception ==
Loverboy ratings
Review scores
Source	Rating
AllMusic	3.5/5 stars
American Songwriter	3.5/5 stars

Paste's Bud Scoppa wrote that the album's "most engaging tracks deftly blend nimble grooves, creamy choruses and vocal performances of immediacy and genuine feeling, attaining a sort of carefree soulfulness that recalls Van Morrison circa 'Brown Eyed Girl' (the seeming blueprint for the ecstatic 'Cosmic Girl') and Silk Degrees-era Boz Scaggs. If you've got a problem with that, so be it. But it works for me."

== Track listing ==
All lyrics are written by Brett Dennen.

No.	Title	Length
1.	"Surprise, Surprise"	4:06
2.	"Dancing at a Funeral"	3:38
3.	"Comeback Kid (That's My Dog)"	3:25
4.	"Frozen in Slow Motion"	3:55
5.	"Sydney (I'll Come Running)"	3:54
6.	"Make You Fall in Love with Me"	4:07
7.	"Only Rain"	5:14
8.	"Can't Stop Thinking About You"	4:07
9.	"Must Be Losing My Mind"	4:28
10.	"Song for Leaving"	5:06
11.	"Queen of the Westside"	6:19
12.	"Little Cosmic Girl"	3:49
13.	"Walk Away, Watch Me Burn"	4:34
14.	"I Want to Feel Free" (iTunes bonus track)	3:35
15.	"Alone Again" (Amazon bonus track)	3:54
