= Gwynfor Llewellyn =

Welsh editor (born 1958)

Gwynfor Llewellyn (born 19 August 1958) is a British editor from Wales. He is known for editing many programmes for the BBC. In 2000 he won a Welsh BAFTA.
