= Shea Seger =

American singer-songwriter (born 1979)

- Born: 1979 (age 46–47); Fort Worth, Texas, United States
- Genres: Singer-songwriter
- Years active: 2000–present
- Label: Formerly BMG International / Currently unsigned
- Website: http://www.sheaseger.com / http://www.myspace.com/sseger

Shea Seger (born 1979) is an American singer-songwriter born in Fort Worth, Texas. Her sound has been likened to a combination of Janis Joplin, Sheryl Crow, Ani DiFranco and Tori Amos.

Seger studied musical theatre in Virginia, before moving to London to record her first album. She currently resides in Virginia and is married to Jimmy Reeves, a graphic design artist.

She has toured with Toploader, James, David Gray and John Mayer.

== Discography ==
=== Studio albums ===
- The May Street Project (2000)
- Shea Seger (2010)
- The Shack (2019)

=== Singles ===
- "Last Time" (2000)
- "Clutch" (2001)
- "I Love You Too Much" (2001)

The track "Clutch" peaked at number 47 in the UK Singles Chart in May 2001.

She contributed two tracks to the soundtrack of the film Railed (2008), written and directed by Ryan Fox. The tracks were "Hourglass" and "Surrender".

On July 19, 2010, Seger released her self-titled second album through the independent record label Truthcore.

== Legacy ==
As a tribute to Seger, director and writer Cameron Crowe named a character (played by Desi Lydic) "Shea Seger" in the 2011 American biographical comedy drama film We Bought a Zoo.
