= Master & Dynamic =

American audio equipment manufacturer

- Industry: Premium audio
- Founded: July 2013 in New York City, United States
- Founders: Jonathan Levine (CEO) & Vicki Gross
- Headquarters: New York City, United States
- Area served: Worldwide
- Key people: Vicki Gross, Mårten Wallby
- Website: masterdynamic.com

Master & Dynamic is an American audio company based in New York City. Founded in 2013, Master & Dynamic designs and manufactures headphones, earphones, speakers, and audio accessories.

Master & Dynamic is geared towards the creative community. The company has partnerships and collaborations with Kevin Durant's Thirty Five Ventures, camera-maker Leica, and Louis Vuitton. The company sponsors the arts program at Harlem Village Academies, a public charter school network in Harlem.

== History ==
Master & Dynamic was founded by Jonathan Levine and Vicki Gross. Levine had previously launched two consumer product companies, and when his teenage son was unable to find headphones that appealed to him, Levine realized there was an opportunity in the market. He partnered with Gross to establish Master & Dynamic in 2013. He subsequently came across a pair of 1940s headphones at a Washington, DC museum, and because they had been built with durable materials such as leather and metal, they remained intact. Levine then hired Swedish industrial designer Mårten Wallby and together they designed Master & Dynamic's first headphones and earphones. They were constructed with long lasting materials such as stainless steel, heavy grain leather, forged and machined anodized aluminum and woven copper cable. The Director of Product Design is Thomas Wilson.

Master & Dynamic launched in May 2014 with an initial product line composed of two headphone and two earphone models. The initial reviews from media outlets including CNET and Wired focused on the quality of the design, sound, and build of the earphones and headphones.

In 2014, Master & Dynamic announced that they had teamed with NeueHouse, a multi-disciplinary coworking collective, to develop a noise-isolating microphone for use in open offices and other environments. Working directly with the collective's membership, Master & Dynamic released the final product, a boom mic, in January 2015. They have partnered with Zero Halliburton on an audio toolkit, and the New York-based fashion house Proenza Schouler on a collection of 3 limited-edition headphones. Two hundred of each design were produced. In November 2015 the company added vegan alcantara headphones.

Master & Dynamic has provided financial support for the Harlem Village Academies arts and music education programs since 2013. Contributions from Master & Dynamic have established HVA High's foundational art program, which offers 2D and 3D art classes within the high school. Master & Dynamic headphones were provided to allow students to work independently and in small groups in their music classes. The company also supports The Center for Arts Education, a non-profit arts organization for children in New York City.

In 2017, Master & Dynamic and the camera-maker Leica began collaborating, producing the "Master & Dynamic for 0.95" collection of headphones with Leica-themed designs. In January 2019 Louis Vuitton partnered with Master & Dynamic to release the wireless Louis Vuitton Horizon Earphones, which feature the fashion brand's monogram.

In May 2019, Thirty Five Ventures, the company owned by basketball player Kevin Durant and sports business executive Rich Kleiman, announced it had become an equity partner in Master & Dynamic.

== Products ==
=== Headphones and earphones ===
The ME05 earphones, released in November 2015, are constructed with solid brass and titanium-coated custom drivers. The first run sold out within three days and a second run sold out after positive reviews were published.

The MW60, Master & Dynamic's first wireless headphones, were released in December 2015. Wired wrote, "there is no better wireless headphone." The MW50, a wireless version of Master & Dynamic's original MH30 on-ear headphones, was released in November 2016. In May 2018, Master & Dynamic added the MW50+, a two-in-one over-ear and on-ear set of headphones.

In September 2018, Master & Dynamic released its MW07 True Wireless Earphones. The earphones received a 2019 Red Dot Design Award and a CES 2019 Innovation Award. In 2019, Master & Dynamic added the MW07 Plus, featuring extended battery life, and the MW07 Go, with water resistance.

In May 2019, Master & Dynamic released its MW65 wireless headphones, featuring noise-cancellation technology. The MW65 received a CES 2020 Innovation Award. According to CES, Master & Dynamic "worked tirelessly to perfect an ANC (active noise-cancelling) technology that would not compromise the signature sound quality the brand has become known and respected for."

For its fifth anniversary, Master & Dynamic released a wireless version of its first pair of headphones, the MH40, in November 2019. According to Robb Report, "While the MH40 Wireless looks like the same set of headphones the company released five years ago, they’re actually an evolutionary leap forward. The most apparent difference is the weight."

In March 2023, Master & Dynamic unveiled an updated version of its MH40 Wireless Over-Ear Headphones. Enhancements in the new model include 40mm titanium drivers and a longer battery life. Founder Jon Levine was quoted as saying that "It’s remarkable and satisfying to see how the original MH40 design has remained relevant and coveted over the years."

=== Speakers ===
In April 2017 Master & Dynamic released its MA770 wireless speaker. It is made of a proprietary concrete composite and was designed in partnership with architect Sir David Adjaye.
