= Talk (Coldplay song) =

2005 single by Coldplay

Single by Coldplay

from the album X&Y
- B-side: "Sleeping Sun"; "Gravity"
- Released: 19 December 2005
- Genre: Alternative rock; indie rock; post-punk revival
- Length: 5:11 (album version); 4:29 (international radio edit); 4:05 (US radio edit)
- Label: Parlophone; Capitol
- Songwriters: Guy Berryman; Jonny Buckland; Will Champion; Chris Martin; Ralf Hütter; Karl Bartos; Emil Schult
- Producers: Danton Supple; Coldplay

Coldplay singles chronology
"Fix You" (2005)	"Talk" (2005)	"The Hardest Part" (2006)

Music video
- "Talk" on YouTube

"Talk" is a song by the British rock band Coldplay. Built around a motif from Kraftwerk's 1981 song "Computer Love", it was written by all members of the band and appeared on their third album, X&Y. In the United States, the song entered at number 86 on the Billboard Hot 100 and elsewhere in the world its success varied. It peaked at number one in the Netherlands on both the Dutch Top 40 and Single Top 100 charts, becoming the band's first number-one single there.

The song received positive reviews, with critics noting the music's sound and memorable lyrics. Both the song and its "Thin White Duke" remix were nominated for the 2007 Grammy Awards, the latter of which won in the category of Best Remixed Recording, Non-Classical.

== Background ==
Coldplay had difficulties with the recording sessions for months, as to the sound of the track. They were skeptical in deciding to add "Talk" to the final track listing of X&Y. During the recording sessions, which had seen the band scrap huge amounts of material, the song was left out when they sent early versions of the album to its record label, Parlophone. The song, however, made it to the track list, after it was properly mixed.

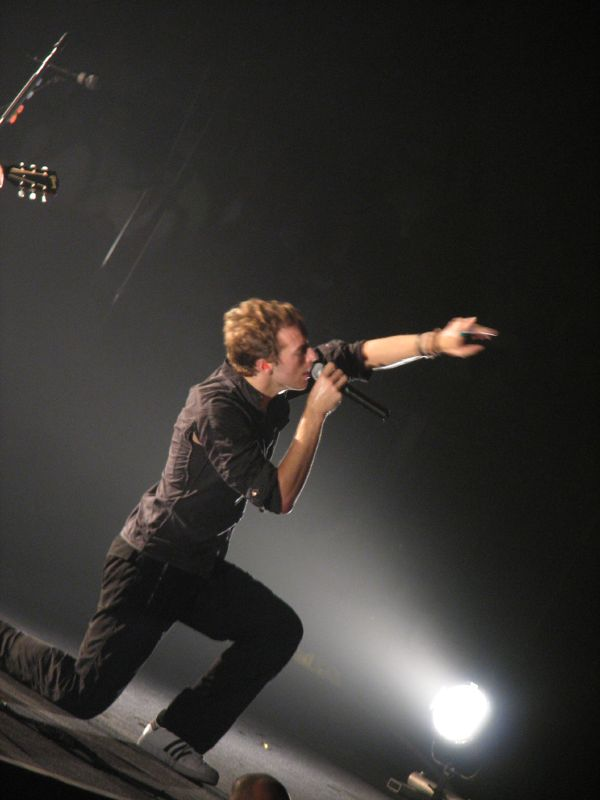
Chris Martin singing "Talk" during the band's Twisted Logic Tour in Hong Kong, 2006.

When asked about the development of the song by NME.com, vocalist Chris Martin said, "From that version, [a version that NME.com heard, while visiting the band in the studio] we went and did a whole other version of it. A whole other song. What happened with the song 'Talk' is that it was all going great and then someone said 'That should be the first single' and we all just freaked out and scrapped it all. [...] We’ve just mixed it and it sounds great. I think we’ve had such pain getting to that place, I’m not sure anyone quite knows what to do with it anymore. When we heard it mixed properly, it sounded mega."

The band received permission from the electronic music German band Kraftwerk to use the main riff from their song "Computer Love", from its 1981 studio album Computer World, for "Talk", replacing Kraftwerk's synthesizers with guitars. In a track-by-track interview given by the band on X&Y, bassist Guy Berryman reported that in response to the band's request, Kraftwerk founding member Ralf Hütter "said something like, 'Yes, you can use it, and thank you very much for asking my permission, unlike that bastard Jay-Z'" (a reference to the latter's "(Always Be My) Sunshine", which uses a Kraftwerk sample). Martin also recalled in a 2007 article in Q that the process of requesting permission to use the melody: He sent a letter through the lawyers of the respective parties and several weeks later received an envelope containing a handwritten reply that simply said "yes". That riff was originally written by former Kraftwerk member Karl Bartos.

The band recorded three separate versions of the single; the one recorded on X&Y was based on an early cut of the song. An early version of the track—with a different set of lyrics—was leaked onto the internet in early 2005. The track was originally intended to be a B-side for the song "Speed of Sound", before becoming the last addition to X&Y's track listing.

== Composition ==
The track begins with a dark, desolate synthesizer beat, resembling 'howling wind', with electric guitar riffs being heard in the background. This slow introduction sets the course for the song's hypnotic pace, with Will Champion adding a metronomic beat to the drums throughout the song. As previously noted, the song features the main hook from Kraftwerk's "Computer Love", replicated by Jonny Buckland's electric guitar riffs throughout much of the track. Buckland also uses the hook as a chiming note for more abrasive riffs during the bridge (or breakdown) near the end of the song. A string section can be heard during the choruses and before the start of the bridge. Guy Berryman also plays uptempo bass lines to complement the track's pace, featuring slower, more abrasive riffs during the song's verses and bridge.

According to Josh Tyrangiel of Time, the meaning to "Talk" is based on how Martin "wants to teach us how to feel better about ourselves, and his lessons have the moral superiority disguised as sensitivity that marked Bono's mighty mullet period." Tyrangiel interpreted the lyrics, "Are you lost or incomplete/ Do you feel like a puzzle, you can't find your missing piece/ Tell me how you feel", with Martin begging in the song.

== Release ==
Coldplay released "Talk" in the UK and US on 19 December 2005 as the album's third single. The single was pressed with two B-sides: "Gravity" and "Sleeping Sun". In Australia, the single was issued on 16 January 2006. "Talk" peaked at number 10 in the UK Singles Chart on 31 December 2005. The song charted at number 86 on the Billboard Hot 100 and reached number five on the Billboard Hot Modern Rock Tracks in 2005. The band performed the song live at the 2005 MTV Europe Music Awards, the 2006 Juno Awards, and the 48th Annual Grammy Awards.

== Reception ==
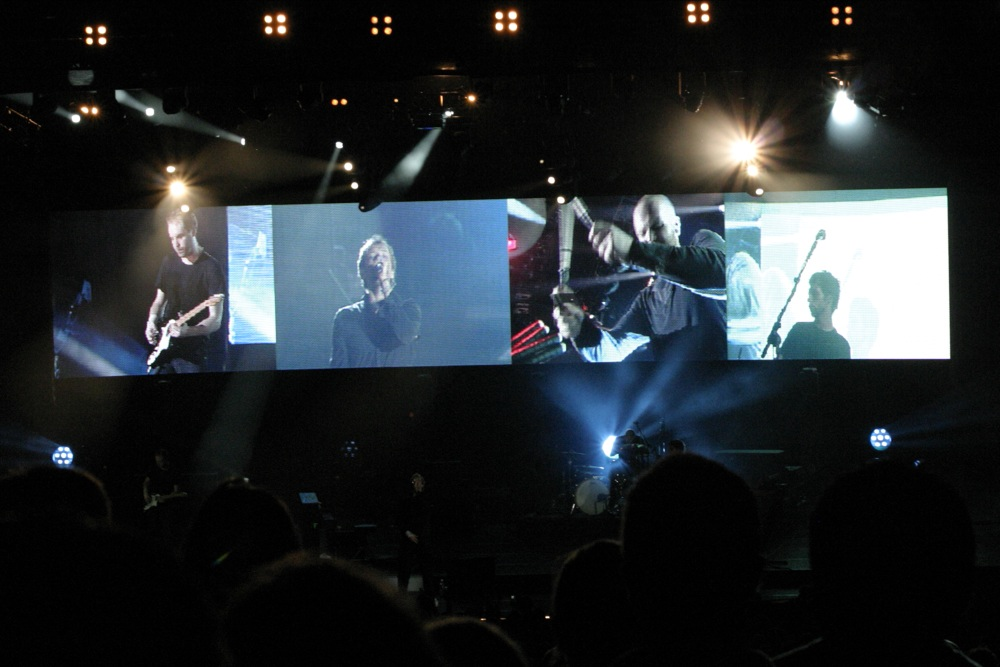
Coldplay performing "Talk" during their 2005 Twisted Logic Tour

Critics were positive towards the song. In the PopMatters review of the album, critic Adrian Begrand wrote: "It's the excellent, and much talked-about 'Talk' that has the band showing tremendous creativity, delving straight into mid-'70s krautrock, and piecing together a gorgeous pop song." Bud Scoppa of Paste wrote: "'Talk' stands out as an anthem in an album full of them." Dan Tallis of the BBC noted that the track was "fantastic" and "positively gargantuan". Jonathan Keefe of Slant wrote: "'Talk' is given one of the album's most memorable melodies, but its impact is reduced by the song's structure, in which the lead guitar echoes Martin's vocal melody after every line, so that melody becomes tiresome well before the first chorus hits." Despite the positive reception of "Talk", Martin has stated that Berryman dislikes it, and thus they no longer perform the song live.

The song was remixed by Jacques Lu Cont, with the title "Talk (Thin White Duke Mix)". The song by Lu Cont won the coveted Best Remixed Recording, Non-Classical award at the 2007 Grammy Awards. "Talk" was also nominated for a Grammy award in the category of Best Rock Performance by a duo or Group with Vocals.

The song was also used as the basis of a downloadable hoax track titled "Talk to David" produced as an April Fools' Day prank by the British newspaper The Guardian. This featured lyrics purporting to give support to Conservative opposition party leader David Cameron. The song was featured heavily in the season two CSI: NY episode "Jamalot", in which the character Danny Messer plays the song as a ringtone on his cell phone. The band's American record label, Capitol, paid for promotional consideration to place the song in the episode and for the character to talk about Coldplay. Billboard included the track on their unranked "50 Best Song Interpolations of the 21st Century" list. RTÉ Gold placed it at number 42 on their list of 100 Best Songs That Use Samples.

== Music video ==
The music video for "Talk" was helmed by Dutch director/photographer Anton Corbijn. Filming of the video took place on 5 and 6 November 2005 at Ealing Studios, London, England. The black-and-white clip invokes a B movie science fiction theme, with imagery ranging from a flying saucer to 3D glasses. The video features the band as astronauts landing on an alien planet, where they discover a giant dormant robot and take one of its dials before re-activating it. They play music for the robot and the robot finds a giant-robot-shaped hole in a mountain, where it prepares to sleep again. The band say farewell to the robot and begin to fly away in their spaceship, but as the robot is powering down, it notices one of its dials is missing and becomes enraged, using a tractor beam to grab the spaceship. The robot eats the band and their spaceship and walks away whistling.

== Personnel ==
Coldplay

- Chris Martin – lead vocals, synthesizer, organ, piano
- Jonny Buckland – guitars
- Guy Berryman – bass guitar, keyboard
- Will Champion – drums, percussion, backing vocals

== Track listings ==
7-inch vinyl R6679
No.	Title	Length
1.	"Talk" (radio edit)	4:29
2.	"Gravity"	6:12

CD CDR6679
No.	Title	Length
1.	"Talk" (radio edit)	4:29
2.	"Sleeping Sun"	3:09

DVD DVDR6679
No.	Title	Length
1.	"Talk" (radio edit)	4:29
2.	"Gravity"	6:17
3.	"Talk" (video)	4:59
4.	"Speed of Sound" (video)	4:29
5.	"Behind-the-scenes footage from "Talk" video shoot" (video)	2:00

The Remixes – 12-inch vinyl and CD-5 (released 6 March 2006) 0946 3 54897 2 9/C2-54897//0946 3 46924 1 0/C1-46924
No.	Title	Length
1.	"Talk" (Thin White Duke mix)	8:17
2.	"Talk" (François K dub)	9:04
3.	"Talk" (Junkie XL mix)	11:45

Australia CD single Capitol C2-50717
No.	Title	Length
1.	"Talk" (radio edit)	4:29
2.	"Sleeping Sun"	3:09
3.	"Gravity"	6:12

Canadian and Japanese CD singles Toshiba-EMI TOCP-40185
No.	Title	Length
1.	"Talk" (radio edit)	4:29
2.	"Sleeping Sun"	3:09
3.	"Gravity"	6:12

US promo CD Toshiba-EMI TOCP-40185
No.	Title	Length
1.	"Talk" (radio edit)	4:05
2.	"Talk" (album version)	5:12

US The Remixes digital EP (released 7 February 2006)
No.	Title	Length
1.	"Talk" (Junkie XL mix)	11:45
2.	"Talk" (François K dub)	9:04
3.	"Talk" (Thin White Duke mix)	8:27

=== Netherlands ===
A special three part single was released over three weeks in December featuring live tracks recorded at the GelreDome in 2005.

CD1 (digipak) (released 2 December 2005) E2-49093
No.	Title	Length
1.	"Talk" (radio edit)	4:27
2.	"Swallowed in the Sea" (live in Holland)	4:22
3.	"God Put a Smile upon Your Face" (live in Holland)	4:22

CD2 (released 9 December 2005) 3490962
No.	Title	Length
1.	"Talk" (album version)	4:11
2.	"Square One" (live in Holland)	5:13
3.	"Clocks" (live in Holland)	7:05

CD3 (released 16 December 2005) 3490972
No.	Title	Length
1.	"Talk" (live in Holland)	5:20
2.	"Til Kingdom Come" (live in Holland)	4:27
3.	"Fix You" (live in Holland)	7:10

== Charts ==
=== Weekly charts ===
Weekly chart performance
Chart (2005–2006)	Peak position
Australia (ARIA)	20
Austria (Ö3 Austria Top 40)	24
Belgium (Ultratop 50 Flanders)	16
Belgium (Ultratop 50 Wallonia)	21
Canada (Nielsen SoundScan)	4
Canada CHR/Pop Top 30 (Radio & Records)	25
Canada Hot AC Top 30 (Radio & Records)	2
Canada Rock Top 30 (Radio & Records)	1
CIS Airplay (TopHit)	125
Czech Republic Airplay (ČNS IFPI)	38
Denmark (Tracklisten)	14
Europe (Eurochart Hot 100)	18
Finland (Suomen virallinen lista)	18
France (SNEP)	34
Germany (GfK)	29
Germany Airplay (BVMI)	4
Hungary (Rádiós Top 40)	38
Ireland (IRMA)	18
Italy (FIMI)	24
Netherlands (Dutch Top 40)	1
Netherlands (Single Top 100)	1
New Zealand (Recorded Music NZ)	20
Scottish Singles Sales (Official Charts)	12
Spain (Promusicae)	8
Sweden (Sverigetopplistan)	56
Switzerland (Schweizer Hitparade)	28
UK Singles (Official Charts)	10
UK Singles Downloads (Official Charts)	8
US Billboard Hot 100	86
US Adult Alternative Airplay (Billboard)	1
US Adult Pop Airplay (Billboard)	10
US Alternative Airplay (Billboard)	5
US Dance Club Songs (Billboard)	1

=== Year-end charts ===
Year-end chart performance
Chart (2005)	Position
Netherlands (Single Top 100)	76

Chart (2006)	Position
Belgium (Ultratop 50 Flanders)	73
Canada Hot AC (Radio & Records)	16
Canada Rock (Radio & Records)	10
Europe (Eurochart Hot 100)	92
Netherlands (Dutch Top 40)	15
Netherlands (Single Top 100)	25
US Adult Top 40 (Billboard)	32
US Dance Club Play (Billboard)	5

== Certifications and sales ==
Certifications and sales
Region	Certification	Certified units/sales
France	—	15,729 (Note: French decade-end sales for "Talk" in the 2000s.)
New Zealand (RMNZ)	Gold	15,000^{‡}
United Kingdom (BPI)	Silver	200,000^{‡}
^{‡} Sales+streaming figures based on certification alone.

== Release history ==
Release dates and formats
Region	Date	Format	Label	Ref.
United States	5 December 2005	Triple A radio	Capitol	
United Kingdom	19 December 2005	CD single	Parlophone	
Japan	25 January 2006	CD single	Parlophone	
United States	4 April 2006	Contemporary hit radio	Capitol	

== See also ==
- List of number-one singles of 2005 (Netherlands)
- List of UK top-ten singles in 2005
- List of Billboard Hot Dance Club Play number ones of 2006
- List of number-one singles of 2006 (Netherlands)
- List of Billboard number-one adult alternative singles of the 2000s
