= XY =

XY, or xy, or any of its variants may refer to:

== Entertainment ==
- Pokémon X and Y, a pair of 2013 role-playing video games in the Pokémon series
- XY (magazine), a gay male youth magazine that also operated a personals website
- X, Y, a 1993 novel by Michael Blumlein
- X&Y, a 2005 album by Coldplay
- Xy, a member of the band Samael

=== Film and television ===
- Aktenzeichen XY… ungelöst, a German television series first broadcast in 1967
- Kyle XY, an American sci-fi television series first broadcast in 2006
- Pokemon The Series: XY, the 17th season of Pokémon and the first and titular season of Pokémon the Series: XY, first broadcast in 2013; named after the games
- X+Y, a 2014 British film
- X/Y, a 2014 American film
- X&Y (film), a 2018 Swedish film
- "XY", an episode of the 8th season of the television series Castle, first broadcast in 2018
- XY Chelsea, a 2019 American-British documentary film about Chelsea Manning

== Science and technology ==
- the XY model, a lattice model of statistical mechanics
- the XY problem, a problem of communication in software engineering and technical support situations

=== Genetics ===
- XY sex chromosomes, in the XY sex-determination system found in many animals
  - a male, an organism typically having one X and one Y chromosome and producing sperm gametes that fuse with a female gamete during sexual reproduction
  - XY gonadal dysgenesis, also known as Swyer syndrome, a type of hypogonadism resulting in a phenotypical female with functionless gonads

=== Mathematics ===
- x and y, symbols commonly used to denote variables in mathematical formulas
- (x, y)-coordinates, a system used to locate a point in two dimensions according to the cartesian coordinate system
- X and Y, symbols conventionally used to denote the domain and codomain of a function
- The definition of an f(x, y) function that produces a hyperbolic paraboloid

== Other uses ==
- XY, IATA code of Flynas (formerly Nas Air), a Saudi low-cost airline
- Xy (digraph), a digraph of the Romanized Popular Alphabet, used to write Hmong
- XY, aircraft registration prefix for Myanmar

== See also ==
- XX (disambiguation)
- Xyz (disambiguation)
- YX (disambiguation)
