= XYZ convention =

Bidding convention in contract bridge

XYZ is a bidding convention in contract bridge.

== Using the convention ==
After opener's one of a suit (X), partner's one of a suit response (Y) and opener's 1-level rebid (Z) (a very common sequence), 2♣ from opener's partner forces 2♦ from opener. Holding a weak hand with diamonds, one can now pass. Other bids are invitational, describing also the nature of the hand. A 2♦ rebid by responder, however, is game forcing with any hand. Responder may also jump to 3 of any suit (except 3♣, which is signoff) to show a game-forcing hand with a good suit or, if the jump is in one of opener's suits, two of the top three honors.

Although it is mandatory in the XY Notrump form of the convention to complete the relay 2♣ to 2♦, when Z was a suit, opener may be unlimited. In such a case it is acceptable, if opener has too good a hand to risk being dropped in 2♦ to bypass the relay and make a (forcing) bid.

It is also customary to retain the convention in the face of certain competitive actions, for example after a double by opener's LHO, or a negative double by partner. After an overcall by RHO, assuming that the bidding has not gone past 1NT, the convention is still on (for example after 1♦ - (pass) - 1♥ - (1♠) - X where X is a Support Double).

The XYZ sequence that starts with 2C after 1-1-1 usually begins an invitational sequence. For example, 1D - 1H -1S - 2C -2D - 2S shows an invitational hand with four spades. However, the 2C relay can also be used to show other hand types. For example, with Axx KQxx Axx KQJ, after partner opens 1D, we respond 1H and partner rebids 1NT, we must bid 4NT quantitative in order to invite slam. Using XYZ, after partner's 1NT rebid, we bid 2C, forcing 2D by partner, and then jump to 3NT, which shows this hand. Thus, we are able to make our slam invitation one level lower.

== Examples ==
For example, on the sequence 1♣-1♠ (with or without opponent's interfering);1NT-2♣;2♦,2♥ will show an invitational hand with minimum five spades and four hearts, 2♠ an invitational hand with minimum five spades (in which case one does not have four hearts) or possibly six spades with or without four hearts. 2NT will show a balanced invitational hand, 3♣ typically an unbalanced invitational hand with club support. However, when one instead forces game with 2♦, opener will immediately start describing his own hand. He may, on basis of the aforementioned auction, with 2♦ being the only difference, bid 2♥ holding four hearts, 2♠ holding three card spade support, etc. Further bids are primarily natural.

== Advantages and disadvantages ==
XYZ gives very good control finding both games and slams and, in the case of a minimum opening, can often result in playing at the two-level where other pairs are at the three-level. On occasion, you can also arrange to play in 2♦ (by simply passing over the relay).

There is of course the disadvantage that the partnership can never play in a contract of 2♣. However, proponents argue that the cases where playing 2♣ is advantageous are rare.

Playing, as very common in combination with XY no trump, the Walsh convention or even Transfer Walsh, one still has the chance of stopping in 2♦ on weak hands, often impossible using for example Checkback Stayman.

== Variations ==
Most of the variations arise in the sequences that follow the 2♣ - 2♦ relay. For example, the exact distinction between the following sequences:

   1♦ - 1♥ - 1♠ - 2♣ - 2♦ - 2NT

and

   1♦ - 1♥ - 1♠ - 2NT

Expert standard practice is that the immediate 2NT, the second auction above, relays to 3♣ to play there. It can also be used for additional hand types when not passed, depending on partnership agreements.

Relaying to 2♦ and then bidding 2NT is how to invite in Notrump.

== See also ==
- XY Notrump convention
- New minor forcing
- Checkback Stayman

== Notes ==
- Ben Dickens' article (Inquiry on BBO)
- An article on the XYZ convention
- Bernard Marcoux's article on XYZ
- Larry Cohen's article
- Mary Savko's article
