= XYZ =

XYZ may refer to:

== Music ==
=== Albums and songs ===
- ...XYZ, 1992 debut album by British indie band Moose
- "XYZ", song by Scottish duo Boards of Canada on the 2019 reissue of the 1999 EP Peel Session
- "XYZ", 2022 song by Canadian music producer and DJ Deadmau5
- XYZ, 1987 solo album by English guitarist Andy Summers
- XYZ, 2022 debut album by Japanese alternative idol group ExWhyZ
- XYZ, 2019 debut album by English group Gloo
- XYZ, 1989 debut album by French rock band XYZ

=== Bands ===
- XYZ (French band), hard rock band
- XYZ (English band), an aborted rock project featuring Jimmy Page, Chris Squire and Alan White

=== Record labels ===
- XYZ Records, American record label

== Media and entertainment ==
- Pokémon the Series: XYZ, the 19th season of Pokémon and the 3rd and final season of Pokémon the Series: XY
- XYZ, a proposed, but not realized, re-branding of ABC Family (now Freeform)
- XYZ (game show), a British daytime TV quiz show
- XYZ Films, an American film production and sales company
- The XYZ Show, a Kenyan satirical puppet show
- XYZnetworks, a former Australian media company
- Xyz Monsters, /ɪkˈsiːz/, in Yu-Gi-Oh! Zexal, a Japanese manga and anime series

== Technology ==
- Here XYZ, a mapping product from Here Technologies
- .xyz, an Internet top-level domain created in 2014
- XYZ (computer), a Polish computer invention

== Other uses ==
- Block, Inc., American financial technology company which trades on the NYSE as XYZ
- Cartesian coordinate system (x,y,z)
- CIE 1931 color space, color coordinates called "XYZ"
- XYZ (website), an Australian far-right website
- XYZ Affair, American–French diplomatic incident
- XYZ convention, a bidding convention in contract bridge
- XYZ file format, a chemical file format
- XYZ Line or Matallana Line, a system of fortifications built during the Spanish Civil War
- XYZ Rail & Civils, railway company in the United Kingdom

== See also ==
- WXYZ (disambiguation), several radio and television call signs
- The XYZ Affair (band), an American indie rock band
- Xyzzy (disambiguation)
