= Fix You =

2005 single by Coldplay

Single by Coldplay

from the album X&Y
- B-side: "The World Turned Upside Down"; "Pour Me" (live at the Hollywood Bowl)
- Released: 5 September 2005
- Recorded: 2004–2005
- Studio: Parr Street (Liverpool); Sarm West (London)
- Genre: Rock
- Length: 4:54 (album version); 4:37 (single version); 4:07 (radio edit)
- Label: Parlophone; Capitol
- Songwriters: Chris Martin; Jonny Buckland; Guy Berryman; Will Champion
- Producers: Ken Nelson; Danton Supple; Coldplay

Coldplay singles chronology
"Speed of Sound" (2005)	"Fix You" (2005)	"Talk" (2005)

Music video
- "Fix You" on YouTube

"Fix You" is a song by the British rock band Coldplay. It was written by all four members of the band for their third studio album, X&Y (2005). It was released on 5 September 2005 as the second single from X&Y and reached number 4 on the UK Singles Chart. The song reached number 18 in the United States Billboard Hot Modern Rock Tracks.

The song is a sobering meditation on grief in the face of the death of a loved one; frontman Chris Martin developed the song to comfort his then-wife, Gwyneth Paltrow, after her father Bruce Paltrow died. The anthemic track builds around an organ accompanied by piano and acoustic guitar and develops into a spirited second half with group vocals, drums and strings. The hopeful message of the song and its two-part arrangement were critically acclaimed. The power ballad has been performed at events such as One Love Manchester in 2017. In September 2021, the song was ranked at number 392 on Rolling Stone's "500 Greatest Songs of All Time".

== Background ==
Coldplay lead singer Chris Martin met American actress Gwyneth Paltrow in late October 2002, three weeks after the death of her father, television director Bruce Paltrow. As their relationship grew closer, Martin and Paltrow would listen to Coldplay's album Parachutes, especially the uplifting song "Everything's Not Lost," to help her process the loss of her father. Martin and Paltrow married in December 2003.

"Fix You" was inspired by Martin's wish to continue helping Paltrow get through her grief. He wanted to base the song on a church organ; instead, he powered up a keyboard given to Paltrow by her father, the instrument sitting unused in their house, to find "it had these amazing sounds on it." Martin said that the song's composition is influenced by English alternative rock band Elbow's 2003 anthem "Grace Under Pressure". In 2005, he described "Fix You" as "probably the most important song we've ever written". He wrote four other songs for or about Paltrow: "Moses" (2003), "Swallowed in the Sea" (2005), "Magic" and "Another's Arms" (2014).

All of Coldplay helped in writing the song. During a track-by-track analysis, bassist Guy Berryman observed that "Fix You" takes "a bit of inspiration" from "Many Rivers to Cross" by Jimmy Cliff (1969). Berryman added, "It becomes its own thing, kind of like points of inspiration that kind of lead you down certain paths. Whenever you want to write a song like someone else, it ultimately ends up sounding like something different anyway."

== Arrangement ==
"Fix You" excerpt
The music of "Fix You" is built around a church-style organ.

The song features an organ and piano in the key of E♭ major. Its main chord progression is E♭–Gm–Cm7–B♭. The time signature is 4/4 and the tempo is 69 beats per minute. Chris Martin's vocals on the track ranges from the low note of B♭_{2} to the high note of B♭_{4}. It begins as a hushed electric organ ballad, with Martin's falsetto. The song then builds in acoustic guitar and piano, accompanied by the sound of string instruments during the beginning choruses. The melody shifts to a plaintive three-note guitar line, ringing through a rhythmic upbeat drum tempo. The song transitions to its bridge, which expands into a blend of piano, electric and bass guitar, drums, and a singalong chorus with an anthemic feel. Electronic sounds from a synthesiser join during the second half of the bridge. The song ends with the beginning chorus, with slow, melancholic piano notes being played in the background.

The message that Martin sings throughout, is of encouragement: "Lights will guide you home / And ignite your bones / And I will try to fix you." Michele Hatty of USA Weekend reported that Martin sings about recovering from grief in the song. Travis Gass of the Bangor Daily News wrote that Martin offers his sympathies for the downtrodden, with "When you love someone but it goes to waste / Could it be worse?".

== Release ==
Capitol promoted "Fix You" to US triple A and alternative radio on 15 August 2005. In the United Kingdom, Parlophone released "Fix You" on 5 September as the second single from X&Y. The single was pressed with two B-sides: "The World Turned Upside Down" and "Pour Me". In Australia, the song was issued as a CD on 12 September 2005. Two days later, the band released the Fix You EP in the iTunes Store. In response to Hurricane Katrina, all of the sales went to the American Red Cross Hurricane 2005 Relief and the National Academy of Recording Arts & Sciences' MusiCares Hurricane Relief Fund.

The track peaked at number four in the UK Singles Chart on 17 September 2005. As of 30 July 2011, the song had spent 122 weeks on that chart. It peaked at number 59 on the Billboard Hot 100 and number 18 on the Billboard Hot Modern Rock Tracks. The song also charted on the Billboard Pop 100 and Hot Digital Songs. The single appeared in Australia's Singles Chart in the number 4 position on 18 September 2005, after retiring in the 58 spot. It also appeared at number 8 on the Irish Singles Chart and spent seven consecutive weeks on the chart. On 14 November 2010, the song re-entered the Australian singles chart at number 37.

In July 2005, Coldplay performed the song on Live 8 and Saturday Night Live.

In 2009, the song appeared on Coldplay's live album LeftRightLeftRightLeft.

On 19 October 2011, following Apple CEO Steve Jobs' death, a private memorial service was held and streamed for Apple employees during which the band played the song. Steve Jobs was a longtime fan of Coldplay. Chris Martin remarked that when Jobs first heard their breakthrough track "Yellow" ten years earlier, he didn't think the band would "make it". On 4 June 2017, Coldplay performed "Fix You" at the One Love Manchester benefit concert for the victims of the Manchester Arena bombing.

== Critical reception ==
=== Reviews ===
The song received widespread acclaim from music critics. Rolling Stone's Kelefa Sanneh wrote in his review for X&Y that "One of the best is 'Fix You', an unabashedly sentimental song where Martin delivers words of encouragement in a gentle falsetto [...] Proving once more that no band can deliver a stately rock ballad like this one." Paul McNamee of NME said "It's a wonderful song that shifts from simple stark piano and voice to a ringing, clattering burst of intent and proto-prog four-part harmony." Meanwhile, Adrien Begrand from PopMatters named "Fix You" the best ballad from X&Y. Alexis Petridis of The Guardian praised it as "beautifully turned [...] The melody of "Fix You" invokes that weird sense of false memory whereby a new song feels instantly familiar". Others were more muted towards the track: Slant's Jonathan Keefe felt it timid, while Pitchfork reviewer Joe Tangari dismissed it as an "AOR ballad". In 2024, PPL ranked "Fix You" as Coldplay's eighth-most played song across radio and television in the United Kingdom.

=== Rankings ===
List of critic rankings
Publication	Year	Description	Result	Ref.
Billboard	2025	The 100 Best Songs of 2005	17	
Blender	2005	The 100 Greatest Songs of 2005	57	
The i Paper	2025	The 50 Best Love Songs of the 21st Century	26	
Insider	2019	Songs to Listen to in Your Lifetime	Placed	
KROQ-FM	2024	Top 500 Songs from the Last 30 Years	411	
MTV Australia	2013	The Official Top 1000 All Time Classics	Placed	
NME	2005	Best Albums and Tracks of 2005	50	
NPO Radio 2	2024	Top 2000	2	
Q	2005	100 Greatest Tracks of the Year	2	
Radio X	2026	The 25 Best Indie Tracks of 2005	21	
Radio X	2026	Best of British 500	114	
Rolling Stone	2024	500 Greatest Songs of All Time	392	
RTÉ Gold	2024	Top 100 Love Songs	57	
Xfm	2010	The Xfm Top 1000 Songs of All Time	Placed	

== Music video ==
The music video for "Fix You" was directed by Sophie Muller, who had previously worked with the band for their 2002 video "In My Place". The video was filmed at the end of two concerts on 4 and 5 July 2005 at the Reebok Stadium in Bolton, England, which were the band's first ever stadium performances. The concert goers doubled as extras for the video shoot, which required two takes on each day to complete.

In the first half of the video, Martin wanders the streets of London starting at Tooley Street under London Bridge station, while the slogan "Make Trade Fair" is projected onto the Royal National Theatre, using the same Baudot code colour scheme on the cover of X&Y. The tunnels that Martin is seen wandering within are located both in and around King's Cross and St Pancras railway stations, with the filming for the video taking place during the time of the redevelopment and expansion of the latter. Martin is then seen walking across Waterloo Bridge, which crosses the River Thames, connecting the South Bank with The Strand. As soon as the electric guitar kicks in, Martin's walk turns into a run as he darts through streets of London, until very quickly reaching the side of the stage at the Reebok Stadium in Bolton, where he joins the rest of the band for the song's finale. The audience sings along with the song's final refrain, and at the end of the video, Martin thanks them for their support and wishes them goodnight.

The video debuted on 1 August 2005. It was nominated at the 15th annual Music Video Production Association Awards in the category of Adult Contemporary.

== Usage in media ==
The song appears on The Acoustic Album (2006). It was performed in 2006 by the New England octogenarian group Young@Heart Chorus. The group's performance was led by former chorus member Fred Knittle, who suffered from congestive heart failure and breathed with assistance from an oxygen tank. The song was recorded for Young@Heart, a 2007 British documentary that aired on Channel 4. The song was featured in "The O.Sea", season 2, episode 23 of the American teen drama television series The O.C. in 2005, as well as the television series Without a Trace, Cold Case, Brothers & Sisters, and The Newsroom. Part of the song was played over the trailer for the 2006 film World Trade Center. It is also featured in the 2006 film You, Me and Dupree.

On 14 March 2009, the band performed a rendition of the song at the relief concert, Sound Relief, in Sydney, Australia.

American rock band Yellowcard covered the song and included it as bonus material on the iTunes version of their 2012 album, Southern Air.

In December 2015, the song was used, alongside "Bridge over Troubled Water", in the UK charity Christmas No. 1 mashup song "A Bridge Over You", by the choir of the Lewisham and Greenwich NHS Trust, selling more than 127,000 copies.

The song was referenced in the 2019 Beatles tribute film Yesterday. A string version of the song was also featured in the animated adventure film Abominable (2019). The song was featured towards the end of the 2019 Korean romance movie Tune in for Love.

English singer Sam Smith covered the song in May 2020, and released it as a single in July the same year. The song was featured on the Japanese edition of their 2020 album Love Goes.

South Korean boy band BTS covered the song in February 2021 for their MTV Unplugged appearance. On 12 October 2021, Ed Sheeran made a surprise appearance with Coldplay at the launch show for the band's ninth studio album, Music of the Spheres, covering the song at London's Shepherd's Bush Empire. In November 2021, Kacey Musgraves covered the song for a stop-motion animation film from Chipotle called A Future Begins, which focused on the farming industry of the United States. It won a silver Clio Award for Use of Music in Film/Video – 61 Seconds to Five Minutes, with Coldplay being credited as the songwriters. The song was used in "A Family Tradition", the final episode of the Spanish heist drama Money Heist, which was released on Netflix in December 2021.

On 29 March 2022, American singer Camila Cabello covered "Fix You" as part of her set list on Concert for Ukraine, a benefit concert on ITV for the people affected by the 2022 Russian invasion of Ukraine.

The National Hockey League (NHL)'s Montreal Canadiens use the song as the team's official entrance music prior to home games played at the Bell Centre.

On 9 December 2024, Jacob Collier performed a version of "Fix You" during his show at the O2 Arena in London. He was joined by Chris Martin and then directed the audience as a choir while Martin continued singing.

The song's lyrics are used by Pete, as his wedding renewal vows to Dawn, in series 3 episode 4 of the British sitcom Gavin and Stacey.

== Awards and nominations ==
The track was nominated for an Ivor Novello Award in the category of Best Song Musically and Lyrically. The song was also nominated for Anthem of the Summer at the UK Festival Awards.

== Track listing ==
No.	Title	Length
1.	"Fix You" (edit)	4:37
2.	"The World Turned Upside Down"	4:32
3.	"Pour Me" (live at the Hollywood Bowl) (featured on the UK Enhanced CD, Australian, and US iTunes EP versions)	5:01
4.	"Fix You" (video) (featured on the UK Enhanced CD)

== Personnel ==
Credits adapted from the digital liner notes.

Band members

- Guy Berryman – bass, synthesizer, producer, backing vocals
- Jonny Buckland – guitars, producer, backing vocals
- Will Champion – drums, percussion, producer, backing vocals
- Chris Martin – lead vocals, guitars, keyboards, organ, piano, producer

Additional personnel

- Ken Nelson, Danton Supple – producer
- Mark Phythian, Carmen Rizzo, Rob Smith – programmer
- Matt McGinn – guitar technician
- Robert Smith – assistants

Engineers

- Keith Gary
- Ken Nelson
- Mark Phythian

Assistant engineers

- Jon Bailey
- Jake Jackson
- Mathieu Lejeune
- Taz Mattar
- Adam Noble
- Mike Pierce
- Dan Porter
- Tim Roe
- Bryan Russell
- Adam Scheuermann
- Rob Smith
- Brad Spence
- Jon Withnall
- Andrea Wright

Mastering engineers

- Chris Athens
- Adam Ayan
- George Marino

Mixing engineers

- Michael H. Brauer
- Keith Gary
- Will Hensley

Recording engineers

- Mark Phythian

Strings

- Susan Dench
- Richard George
- Peter Lale
- Ann Lines
- Laura Melhuish
- Audrey Riley (arranger)
- Chris Tombling
- Greg Warren Wilson

== Charts ==
=== Weekly charts ===
Weekly chart performance in the 2000s
Chart (2005)	Peak position
Australia (ARIA)	25
Austria (Ö3 Austria Top 40)	58
Belgium (Ultratip Bubbling Under Flanders)	5
Belgium (Ultratip Bubbling Under Wallonia)	3
Canada (Nielsen SoundScan)	4
Europe (Eurochart Hot 100)	15
Germany (GfK)	65
Ireland (IRMA)	8
Italy (FIMI)	13
Netherlands (Dutch Top 40 Tipparade)	3
Netherlands (Single Top 100)	43
New Zealand (Recorded Music NZ)	17
Spain (Promusicae)	6
Sweden (Sverigetopplistan)	26
Switzerland (Schweizer Hitparade)	53
UK Singles (Official Charts)	4
US Billboard Hot 100	59
US Adult Alternative Airplay (Billboard)	3
US Adult Pop Airplay (Billboard)	24
US Alternative Airplay (Billboard)	18

Weekly chart performance in the 2000s
Chart (2013–2017)	Peak position
France (SNEP)	189
Portugal (AFP)	94
South Korea (Gaon)	100
South Korea International (Gaon)	6
UK Singles (Official Charts)	42

Weekly chart performance in the 2020s
Chart (2020–2026)	Peak position
Argentina Hot 100 (Billboard)	99
Austria (Ö3 Austria Top 40)	24
Finland (Suomen virallinen lista)	38
Greece International (IFPI)	28
Hong Kong (Billboard)	22
Malaysia (Billboard)	19
Malaysia International (RIM)	19
Netherlands (Single Top 100)	56
Norway Airplay (IFPI Norge)	72
Portugal (AFP)	20
Singapore (RIAS)	6
South Korea BGM (Circle)	57
South Korea Download (Circle)	170
United Arab Emirates (IFPI)	15
US Hot Rock & Alternative Songs (Billboard)	13

=== Monthly charts ===
Monthly chart performance
Chart (2017)	Peak position
South Korea International (Gaon)	19

=== Year-end charts ===
Year-end chart performance
Chart (2005)	Position
UK Singles (OCC)	57
US Modern Rock Tracks (Billboard)	87
US Triple-A (Billboard)	25
Venezuela (Record Report)	48

Chart (2006)	Position
UK Singles (OCC)	172

Chart (2011)	Position
UK Singles (OCC)	167

Chart (2017)	Position
South Korea International (Gaon)	67

== Certifications and sales ==
Certifications and sales
Region	Certification	Certified units/sales
Australia (ARIA)	6× Platinum	420,000^{‡}
Denmark (IFPI Danmark)	2× Platinum	180,000^{‡}
Germany (BVMI)	Platinum	600,000^{‡}
Italy (FIMI) Sales since 2009	3× Platinum	300,000^{‡}
New Zealand (RMNZ)	6× Platinum	180,000^{‡}
Portugal (AFP)	3× Platinum	60,000^{‡}
South Korea	—	215,664 (Note: South Korean year-end digital sales for "Fix You" in 2017.)
Spain (Promusicae)	3× Platinum	180,000^{‡}
United Kingdom (BPI)	5× Platinum	3,000,000^{‡}
United States (RIAA)	3× Platinum	3,000,000^{‡}
^{‡} Sales+streaming figures based on certification alone.

== Release history ==
Release dates and formats
Region	Date	Format	Label	Ref.
United States	15 August 2005	Triple A; alternative radio	Capitol	
United Kingdom	5 September 2005	CD	Parlophone	
Australia	12 September 2005	CD	Parlophone	
Japan	14 September 2005	CD	Parlophone	

== See also ==
- List of UK top-ten singles in 2005
