= New minor forcing =

Contract bridge bidding convention

New Minor Forcing (NMF), is a contract bridge bidding convention used to find a 5-3 or 4-4 major suit fit after a specific sequence of bids in which opener has rebid one notrump. The convention is triggered by responder at his second turn by an artificial bid of two in an unbid minor; it requires that he hold five cards in the major he has previously bid and an unlimited hand ranging in value from at least game invitational strength (11 or more points) to that sufficient to have interest in slam; he may also hold four cards in the other major. Accordingly, there are six bidding sequences in which the New Minor Forcing bid may be applied:

Sequence 1
Opener	Responder
1♣	1♥
1NT	2♦!

Sequence 2
Opener	Responder
1♣	1♠
1NT	2♦!

Sequence 3
Opener	Responder
1♦	1♥
1NT	2♣!

Sequence 4
Opener	Responder
1♦	1♠
1NT	2♣!

Sequence 5
Opener	Responder
1♥	1♠
1NT	2♣!

Sequence 6
Opener	Responder
1♥	1♠
1NT	2♦!

Auction notes:
1. The opponents are silent throughout.
2. The ! indicates that the bid is alertable.

The New Minor Forcing bid by responder is forcing for one round and asks partner for further information on his shape and strength with the primary objectives of determining if opener has three-card support for responder's five-card major and/or if there is a 4-4 fit in hearts; other major suit fits are also investigated.

In sequences 5 and 6, the NMF bid is made in the stronger minor suit. A jump by responder in an unbid minor after a 1NT rebid by opener is weak and to play.

The bid of the new minor must be alerted by opener.

== Responses and continuations ==
Methods differ on the priority and meaning of opener's response to the NMF asking bid.

According to Seagram and Smith, the priority for responses by opener are:

1. to show an unbid four-card major. This can only be hearts. With a minimum 1NT hand (12 to a poor 13 HCP), bid the minimum 2♥; with a maximum 1NT hand (a good 13 or any 14 HCP), jump to 3♥.
2. to support partner's five-card spade suit if possible. With three cards and a minimum hand, bid spades at the two level; with three cards and a maximum, jump to the three level.
3. to show whether holding a minimum or maximum for one's 1NT bid and whether or not holding stoppers in the two unbid suits (the NMF suit is an unbid suit). There are five possibilities:
  1. with a minimum hand and stoppers in both unbid suits, bid 2NT.
  2. with a minimum hand and without stoppers in both unbid suits, rebid your first suit.
  3. with a maximum hand and stoppers in both unbid suits, bid 3NT.
  4. with a maximum hand and with a stopper in only one of the unbid suits, bid the suit in which you hold the stopper unless it is hearts; if it is hearts, jump bid in your first suit.
  5. with a maximum hand and without stoppers in either of the unbid suits, jump bid in your first suit.

Others suggest that the first priority is to show three-card support for responder's major. Partnership agreement on this and other continuations is required.

== Examples ==
Typical hands suitable for use of the New Minor Forcing convention include the following:

Given the auction: 1♦ – 1♥; 1NT – 2♣ (NMF)

- ♠ Ax ♥ KQxxx ♦ Qxx ♣ xxx : interested in either a game or part score, in either hearts or notrump
- ♠ Axx ♥ AKxx ♦ AQxxx ♣ J : expecting to play a slam, possibly a grand slam, in either diamonds or notrump
- ♠ Ax ♥ KQJ10x ♦ xx ♣ AQJx : you can bid a minor you have

Given the auction: 1♣ – 1♠; 1NT – 2♦ (NMF)

- ♠ Axxxx ♥ KQx ♦ Axxx ♣ J : planning to force to game, in either spades or notrump
- ♠ Axxxx ♥ KQx ♦ x ♣ Axxx : looking for spade support because if partner has three it may play better than notrump, and clubs may also be an option
- ♠ AKxxx ♥ KQxx ♦ x ♣ Axx : unsure for the right denomination to play, the hand could play game in spades, hearts, notrump or clubs

When playing this convention, jump rebids by responder are typically played as invitational, as NMF can be used with hands wishing to force to game. For example, on the auction above, a 3♥ bid would be used with a hand such as ♠ Kxx ♥ AQ10xxx ♦ xx ♣ xx, to show an interest in game, but only in hearts.

If you're playing New Minor Forcing, the auction: 1♦ – 1♠; 1NT – 3♥ shows a 5 card heart suit and at least 5 spades with a game-going hand. Without New Minor Forcing you may bid 3♥ on something like ♠ AKxxx ♥ KQxx ♦ x ♣ Axx

Also the auction: 1♦ – 1♠; 1NT – 2♥ can show a hand with 5 spades and 4 or 5 hearts with no interest in game

Opener's rebid shows both shape and strength. Although there is variation among partnerships regarding the priority of suits to show, a common agreement is that first priority is to show secondary support for responder's suit, then four cards in the other major, then additional length in a minor, with a jump to show a maximum.

Given the auction:

1♦ – 1♥; 1NT – 2♣ (NMF)

Opener's third bids and their meanings would be:

- 2♦ – minimum, usually five diamonds, without three hearts
- 2♥ – minimum, three hearts (generally with a balanced hand or weak trumps, as most experts will raise immediately with decent trumps and some shape)
- 2♠ – minimum, four spades (rare, as opener would usually have bid 1♠ a round earlier, except perhaps with a hand such as ♠ 10xxx ♥ AJ ♦ K10xx ♣ KQx)
- 2NT – minimum, no extra shape (most often 3-2-4-4, by inference)

Bids at the three level show similar hands, but with a maximum. The meanings of the strength ranges are dependent on a partnership's opening-bid style, as well as its notrump range. Assuming a Standard American 15-17 1NT, a minimum would typically be 12-13 HCP and a maximum would be 14 HCP or some very good 13 HCP hands.

A similar scheme can be applied after opener's 2NT rebid, which typically shows 18-19 HCP: bid of a new minor is forcing by responder (although lesser values are required), and the opener shows the distribution in the same manner. The opener should not jump-rebid at the four level in this case, so as to not skip 3NT (responder's NMF doesn't generally guarantee 5-card major or 4–4 in majors).

== See also ==
- Checkback Stayman
- Transfer Walsh
- Walsh convention
- XY Notrump convention
- XYZ convention
