= XY Notrump convention =

Bidding convention in contract bridge

XY Notrump (also known as Two Way Checkback and Two Way New-Minor-Forcing) is a bidding convention in contract bridge.

== Using the convention ==
After opener's one of a suit (X), partner's one of a suit response (Y) and opener's 1NT rebid (a very common sequence), 2♣ from opener's partner forces 2♦ from opener. Holding a weak hand with diamonds, one can now pass. Other bids are invitational, describing also the nature of the hand. A 2♦ response to 1NT, however, is game forcing with any hand. Responder may also jump to 3 of any suit (except 3♣, which is signoff) to show a slam-invitational hand with good suit(s).

== Examples ==
For example, on the sequence 1♣-1♠ (with or without opponent's interfering);1NT-2♣;2♦,2♥ will show an invitational hand with minimum five spades and four hearts, 2♠ an invitational hand with minimum five spades (in which case one does not have four hearts) or possibly six spades with or without four hearts. 2NT will show a balanced invitational hand, 3♣ typically an unbalanced invitational hand with club support. However, when one instead forces game with 2♦, opener will immediately start describing his own hand. He may, on basis of the aforementioned auction, with 2♦ being the only difference, bid 2♥ holding four hearts, 2♠ holding three card spade support, etc. Further bids are primarily natural.

== Advantages ==
XY Notrump gives very good control finding both games and slams, as the final "mission" of the sequence is established at a relatively early stage of bidding.

Playing, as very common in combination with XY no trump, the Walsh convention or even Transfer Walsh, one still has the chance of stopping in 2♦ on weak hands, often impossible using for example Checkback Stayman.

== Variations ==
A popular expanded version of XY Notrump is the so-called "XYZ" , meaning the principles of regular XY Notrump is valid even after one of a suit (X) - one of a suit (Y); one of a suit (or notrump) (Z) auction. It replaces such a method as Fourth suit forcing.

== See also ==
- Walsh convention
- XYZ convention
- Transfer Walsh
- New minor forcing
- Checkback Stayman

== Notes ==
- A publication on the XYZ variation of the XY Notrump convention
- A system publication based on Baard Olav Aasan methods, concerning particularly Transfer Walsh and XY no trump (in Norwegian)
