= Speed of Sound (song) =

2005 song by Coldplay

Single by Coldplay

from the album X&Y
- B-side: "Things I Don't Understand"; "Proof"
- Released: 19 April 2005
- Genre: Arena rock; rock
- Length: 4:49 (album version); 4:23 (radio edit)
- Label: Parlophone; Capitol
- Songwriters: Guy Berryman; Jonny Buckland; Will Champion; Chris Martin
- Producers: Danton Supple; Coldplay

Coldplay singles chronology
"God Put a Smile upon Your Face" (2003)	"Speed of Sound" (2005)	"Fix You" (2005)

Music video
- "Speed of Sound" on YouTube

"Speed of Sound" is a song by British rock band Coldplay. It was released as the lead single for their third studio album, X&Y (2005), on 19 April 2005, following its radio premiere on the previous day at Steve Lamacq's BBC Radio 1 show. Written by all members of the band, the song was built around a piano and guitar riff, peaking into a synthesiser-heavy chorus. A physical version of the single was issued on 23 May in the United Kingdom, containing the B-sides "Things I Don't Understand" and "Proof".

Vocalist and pianist Chris Martin stated that the song was written after the band had listened to English singer Kate Bush. Upon release, it charted in the UK Singles Chart at number two. In the United States, it debuted at number eight on the Billboard Hot 100, becoming their first top ten hit and highest-peaking song until "Viva la Vida" reached number one in 2008.

"Speed of Sound" was named the Song of the Year by the American Society of Composers, Authors and Publishers (ASCAP) and later nominated for Best Rock Song and Best Rock Performance by a Duo or Group with Vocal at the 48th Annual Grammy Awards. It won the Brit Award for Best British Single at the 2006 Brit Awards. In the same year, the music video received four nominations at the MTV Video Music Awards. "Speed of Sound" is also notable for being the billionth download purchased on the iTunes Store.

== Background ==
In an interview, Coldplay vocalist Chris Martin revealed that "Speed of Sound" was written in mid-2004 and was inspired by Martin's daughter, Apple, and English alternative rock singer Kate Bush: "That's a song where we were listening to a lot of Kate Bush last summer, and we wanted a song which had a lot of tom-toms in it. I just had my daughter up also, and was kind of feeling in a sense of awe and wonderment, so the song is kind of a Kate Bush song about miracles." The drumbeat of the song was inspired by Bush's 1985 song "Running Up that Hill". In a separate interview, bassist Guy Berryman said: "We were really trying to recreate the drums on that song for this song, and the chords. Some bands are reluctant to admit that they take things from other artists and bands that they listen to and we're shameless in that respect, we don't mind telling."

The band's opinion towards the song, however, has soured. Martin has said that he dislikes "Speed of Sound", saying in a 2011 interview, "We never got it right." Due to this, Martin is reluctant to perform the song live, noting during an interview with Howard Stern that "an audience can pick up real fast if you’re not convinced by something.”

== Composition ==
"Speed of Sound" excerpt
The music of "Speed of Sound" is built around a repetitive piano riff.

"Speed of Sound" is a piano-based song with an upbeat tempo. The song begins with the insistently ornate keyboard melody, with a backing synthesizer that is heard throughout the song. The melody then transitions into the first verse being sung by lead singer Chris Martin. It repeats, with the song then transitioning into its second verse. The verses of song feature the rest of the band as the song continues to build. It then climaxes with the anthemic chorus, which features a huge roar of instrumentation that includes electric and bass guitars, drums, and synthesizers. The song then ends with the chorus and its grandiose sound. "Speed of Sound" is written in the key of A Mixolydian.

The lyrics in the song are cryptic. The ending lines of the chorus emphasise belief and assurance: "If you could see it then you'd understand/Ah, when you see it then you'll understand". This belief is restated in the third verse: "Some things you have to believe/others are puzzles puzzling me". The fourth line in the second verse alludes to discovering one's place in the world: "How long am I gonna stand/with my head stuck under the sand".

In his review of X&Y, Bill White of the Seattle Post-Intelligencer newspaper noted that the "slowing ... creative juices" evident in "Speed of Sound" compare to "melodies from both Jeff Buckley ('Last Goodbye') and Keane ('Everybody's Changing')".

== Release ==
"Speed of Sound" premiered on 18 April 2005 during Steve Lamacq's show at the BBC Radio 1, receiving a digital download release in the following day. However, since tracks had to be made available both digitally and physically to enter the UK Singles Chart, the band issued CD and 7" editions on 23 May. The single was pressed with two B-sides: "Things I Don't Understand" and "Proof".

== Critical reception ==
=== Reviews ===
The song was met with a polarised response from critics. PopMatters felt that the song "comes close to sounding too safe, almost like the band is on autopilot". Several critics felt that the song resembled Coldplay's earlier single "Clocks". MusicOMH commented that "Speed Of Sound, the lead single, has 'Clocks'-like drumming contrasts with synth sequences that remind more of Enya than rock music" and criticised it for sounding "familiar and far older than it is". Pitchfork likewise criticised the song's "uncanny resemblance to 'Clocks'" and continued "Certainly, it rarely hurts to stick with what works, but this is not just a near-exact replica of its successful predecessor; it's also a less memorable song".

The Village Voice felt the song was "unusually accomplished, fresh, and emotional". Paste lauded the song, saying that it "reveals the hand [Coldplay are] playing: a piano riff as memorable as the one in 'Clocks,' ringing guitars, martial drums, orchestral pomp and, in the center, Chris Martin's keening vocal, so vulnerable and yet forceful enough to stand out from the mass of sonic detail". Rolling Stone gave a mixed review, calling it "an appealing but not thrilling song".

=== Rankings ===
List of critic rankings
Publication	Year	Description	Result	Ref.
Blender	2005	The 100 Greatest Songs of 2005	16	
NPO Radio 2	2007	Top 2000	334	
Radio X	2010	The Xfm Top 1000 Songs of All Time	Placed	
Radio X	2026	Best of British 500	308	

== Chart performance ==
"Speed of Sound" was beaten to the number one spot on the UK Singles Chart by the novelty song "Axel F" by the Crazy Frog, instead peaking at number two for a week, although it did stay in the Top 75 for sixteen non-consecutive weeks. However, it became Coldplay's first UK download number one.

It also became Coldplay's first and (at that point) biggest single to chart in the top 10 of the Billboard Hot 100, debuting as well as peaking at number eight, making it the band's most successful single until "Viva la Vida" reached number one in 2008. The single marked the first time a British band entered directly in the top 10 of the Billboard Hot 100 chart since the Beatles. It was also the billionth song download on the iTunes Store. In Japan, "Speed of Sound" debuted at number 67 with an estimated 1,891 copies sold. In 2024, PPL ranked it as Coldplay's tenth-most played track across radio and television in the United Kingdom.

== Accolades ==
"Speed of Sound" was nominated for Best Rock Song and Best Rock Performance by a Duo or Group with Vocals at the 48th Annual Grammy Awards in 2006. It won a MTV Europe Music Award for Best Song at the 2005 MTV Europe Music Awards as well. In December 2005, the track appeared at number nine on Q's 100 Greatest Tracks of the Year. It won a Brit Award for Best British Single at the Brit Awards 2006. The American Society of Composers, Authors and Publishers (ASCAP) named "Speed of Sound" their Song of the Year. In 2024, KROQ-FM included "Speed of Sound" on their "Top 500 Songs from the Last 30 Years" list at number 365.

== Music video ==
=== Production ===
The music video has a two-story-high LED display in the background

The video promo for "Speed of Sound" was shot on a Los Angeles sound stage on 22 and 23 April 2005. Shooting took place on large sets backed by large light-emitting diode (LED) displays developed by Element Labs. The performance-based video was directed by Mark Romanek. The video features the band performing in front of a curved ellipse wall that consists of 640 Element Labs' VersaTubes placed on 6-inch (150 mm) centres.

The on-set animations were programmed and performed live during the shoot via the suggestion of visualist Ash Beck. Romanek wanted the song's stem "split out" and to have the drums, bass, guitar, and vocals on separate tracks, which were then animated, and the lights were synthesised to each of the tracks. In the end, Romanek and Michael Keeling, the lighting designer, opted to use Chris Martin's vocal track to animate "because it had such dynamics. Roughly 75% of the video is driven by voice-activated animation", said Keeling.

=== Video ===
The video opens in pitch-black, followed by a light framing Martin as he reaches skyward out of the shadows. The scene then shifts to the band, as they play the song. When Martin spread his hands, the two-storey-high LED lights erupt in a colour of rainbow hues. The LED background changes colours as the band continues. The video concludes its ending with the band lined up, one-by-one, and the LED set displaying a white light background.

The video debuted on 23 May 2005 and proved successful on video-chart programs. It debuted on 11 June 2005 on Fuse's No. 1 Countdown Rock, at number six, and retired on 5 August at number seven of the countdown. It also reached number sixteen in MuchMusic's Countdown a month after its debut. At the 2005 MTV Video Music Awards, the video garnered nominations in the categories of Video of the Year, Best Special Effects, Best Editing, and Best Cinematography. The video was the ranked at number 10 on VH1's Top 40 of 2005.

== Personnel ==
- Chris Martin – lead vocals, piano, synthesizer
- Jonny Buckland – electric guitar
- Guy Berryman – bass guitar, backing vocals
- Will Champion – drums, backing vocals

== Track listing ==
CD single
No.	Title	Length
1.	"Speed of Sound"	4:51
2.	"Things I Don't Understand"	4:55
3.	"Proof"	4:10

- UK CD CDR6664, 7-inch R6664, 12-inch 12R6664, 10-inch 10R6664
- Australia CD 872 9862 released 23 May 2005 by Capitol

== Charts ==
=== Weekly charts ===
Weekly chart performance
Chart (2005)	Peak position
Australia (ARIA)	9
Austria (Ö3 Austria Top 40)	23
Belgium (Ultratop 50 Flanders)	34
Belgium (Ultratop 50 Wallonia)	31
Canada (Nielsen SoundScan)	2
Canada CHR/Pop Top 30 (Radio & Records)	13
Canada Hot AC Top 30 (Radio & Records)	1
Canada Rock Top 30 (Radio & Records)	1
Czech Republic (IFPI)	13
Denmark (Tracklisten)	7
Europe (Eurochart Hot 100)	3
Finland (Suomen virallinen lista)	3
France (SNEP)	42
Germany (GfK)	19
Greece (IFPI)	5
Hungary (Rádiós Top 40)	8
Ireland (IRMA)	11
Italy (FIMI)	2
Japan (Oricon)	67
Netherlands (Dutch Top 40)	6
Netherlands (Single Top 100)	6
New Zealand (Recorded Music NZ)	13
Norway (VG-lista)	11
Scottish Singles Sales (Official Charts)	3
Spain (Promusicae)	2
Sweden (Sverigetopplistan)	34
Switzerland (Schweizer Hitparade)	22
UK Singles (Official Charts)	2
US Billboard Hot 100	8
US Adult Alternative Airplay (Billboard)	1
US Adult Pop Airplay (Billboard)	3
US Alternative Airplay (Billboard)	5
US Pop Airplay (Billboard)	25

=== Year-end charts ===
Year-end chart performance
Chart (2005)	Position
Brazil (Crowley)	22
Europe (Eurochart Hot 100)	84
Hungary (Rádiós Top 40)	73
Italy (FIMI)	38
Netherlands (Dutch Top 40)	24
Spain (PROMUSICAE)	9
UK Singles (OCC)	41
US Billboard Hot 100	57
US Adult Top 40 (Billboard)	15
US Mainstream Top 40 (Billboard)	93
US Modern Rock Tracks (Billboard)	19
US Triple-A (Billboard)	1
Venezuela Pop Rock (Record Report)	1

== Certifications and sales ==
Certifications and sales
Region	Certification	Certified units/sales
Australia (ARIA)	Platinum	70,000^{‡}
Canada (Music Canada)	Gold	10,000^{*}
Denmark (IFPI Danmark)	Gold	7,500 (Note: Danish certified sales for "Speed of Sound" as of July 2008.)
France	—	21,217 (Note: French decade-end sales for "Speed of Sound" in the 2000s.)
Italy	—	11,000 (Note: Italian year-end sales for "Speed of Sound" in 2005.)
Italy (FIMI) Sales since 2009	Gold	50,000^{‡}
Japan	—	2,745 (Note: Japanese physical sales for "Speed of Sound" as of May 2005.)
New Zealand (RMNZ)	Platinum	30,000^{‡}
Spain (Promusicae)	Gold	30,000^{‡}
United Kingdom (BPI)	Platinum	600,000^{‡}
United States (RIAA)	Gold	500,000^{*}
^{*} Sales figures based on certification alone.^{‡} Sales+streaming figures based on certification alone.

== Release history ==
Release dates and formats
Region	Date	Format(s)	Label	Ref.
United States	18 April 2005	Triple A radio	Capitol	
United Kingdom	23 May 2005	7-inch vinyl; 10-inch vinyl; CD	Parlophone	
United States	31 May 2005	Contemporary hit radio	Capitol	

== See also ==
- List of Billboard Hot 100 top-ten singles in 2005
- List of top 10 singles for 2005 in Australia
- List of UK top-ten singles in 2005
- List of Billboard number-one adult alternative singles of the 2000s
