= X&Y =

2005 studio album by Coldplay

Studio album by Coldplay
- Released: 6 June 2005
- Recorded: January 2004 – January 2005
- Studios: AIR (London); Parr Street (Liverpool); CRC (Chicago); Sarm West (London); Townhouse (London); The Hit Factory (New York City)
- Genres: Alternative rock; space rock
- Length: 62:30
- Labels: Parlophone; Capitol
- Producers: Danton Supple; Ken Nelson; Coldplay

Coldplay chronology
Live 2003 (2003)	X&Y (2005)	The Singles 1999–2006 (2007)

Singles from X&Y
- 1. "Speed of Sound" Released: 19 April 2005; 2. "Fix You" Released: 5 September 2005; 3. "Talk" Released: 19 December 2005; 4. "The Hardest Part" Released: 3 April 2006

X&Y is the third studio album by the British rock band Coldplay. It was released on 6 June 2005 by Parlophone in the United Kingdom, and a day later by Capitol in the United States. Produced by Coldplay and producer Danton Supple, the album was recorded during a turbulent period for the band, during which their manager and creative director, Phil Harvey, briefly departed. Producer Ken Nelson was originally tasked with producing the record; however, many songs written during his sessions were discarded due to the band's dissatisfaction with them. The album's cover art combines colours and blocks to represent the title in Baudot code.

The album contains twelve tracks, divided into respective halves labeled "X" and "Y", and an additional hidden song, "Til Kingdom Come", which is listed as "+" on the disc label and inside the record's booklet. It was originally planned for American country star Johnny Cash to record it with lead singer Chris Martin, but Cash died before he was able to do so. At a runtime of 62 minutes and 30 seconds, it is Coldplay's longest studio album.

After facing high anticipation, X&Y received positive reviews and was a significant commercial success. The album reached number one in 32 countries upon release, with EMI shipping over 5 million copies in its first week worldwide. In the United Kingdom, the band earned the third-highest debut in history. In the United States, they earned their first Billboard 200 chart-topper. X&Y was the best-selling album of 2005, with 8.3 million copies. It ranks among the biggest records of the 21st century, with 13 million units by December 2012. Four singles were made available: "Speed of Sound", "Fix You", "Talk" and "The Hardest Part". Despite its success, the band's opinion of the album has soured over time, largely due to the recording's turbulent dynamic and their disappointment in the final product.

== Background ==
Coldplay announced details about X&Y in March 2004 while the album was being recorded. Their initial plans were to stay out of the public eye throughout the year. Lead singer Chris Martin stated, "We really feel that we have to be away for a while and we certainly won't release anything this year, because I think people are a bit sick of us." This plan was not carried out, because of the pressure their second album A Rush of Blood to the Head had induced; but they were trying "to make the best thing that anyone has ever heard". Prior to the announcement, Martin, lead guitarist Jonny Buckland and British record producer Ken Nelson had started recording demos while in Chicago. The band then entered a London studio in January 2004.

== Recording ==
The band spent all of 2004 producing X&Y. The released album is the third version the band had produced during the recording sessions, and some have even considered it as their fifth album due to constant changes in track lists and re-recordings. The band members were not satisfied with the output of their initial sessions with Nelson, who had produced the band's previous two albums, Parachutes (2000) and A Rush of Blood to the Head (2002). It also remains the only Coldplay album in which they had been through the creative process without Phil Harvey's "presence, influence and guidance".

The initial set release date was late 2004, but was later pushed back to January 2005. As the new target date was approaching, the band again discarded songs, which they deemed "flat" and "passionless". Sixty songs were written during these sessions, fifty-two of which were ditched. The band started rehearsing the songs for a planned tour, but felt the songs sounded better live compared to their recorded versions: "We realized that we didn't really have the right songs and some of them were starting to sound better because we were playing them than they did on record, so we thought we better go back and record them again." Guitarist Jonny Buckland has said that the band had pushed themselves "forward in every direction" in making the album, but they felt it sounded like they were going backwards compared to their earlier works.

Attempting to perfect their work, Coldplay had to "step it up a few notches and work hard at it to get it right". The band chose Danton Supple, who mixed the bulk of A Rush of Blood to the Head, to oversee the production of X&Y. When January went, the band had to finish the album; they were conscious of the pressure as "expectations for the record grew larger" and "completing it became tougher and tougher". Finally, the band were settled with the song "Square One", which Martin has described as "a call to arms" and a "plea" to each of them "not to be intimidated by anything or anyone else". Once finished, the band felt like they could do their own songs and not have to think of anyone else's demands. During this month, the band were into the final weeks of production and had put the finishing touches on the tracks.

Drummer Will Champion later admitted that Coldplay did not rush to complete the album "because the prospect of touring again was so daunting that we felt we should take our time, and also we wanted to make sure that it was the best it could possibly be". According to him, the band had no deadline, which allowed them not to feel pressured into finishing something. Once a proper deadline was imposed onto the band, they became more productive than in previous sessions. At this juncture, the band had written "about 14 or 15 songs". Martin added that the reason why they ended up late was that they "... kept [adding] finishing [touches to] the record until it was way too late ... [they] don't listen to it at the moment, because [they would] just find something to go back and change." The late release of the album was blamed for a drop in EMI's share price. In response, Chris Martin said "I don't really care about EMI. I think shareholders are the great evil of this modern world."

== Composition ==
=== Music ===
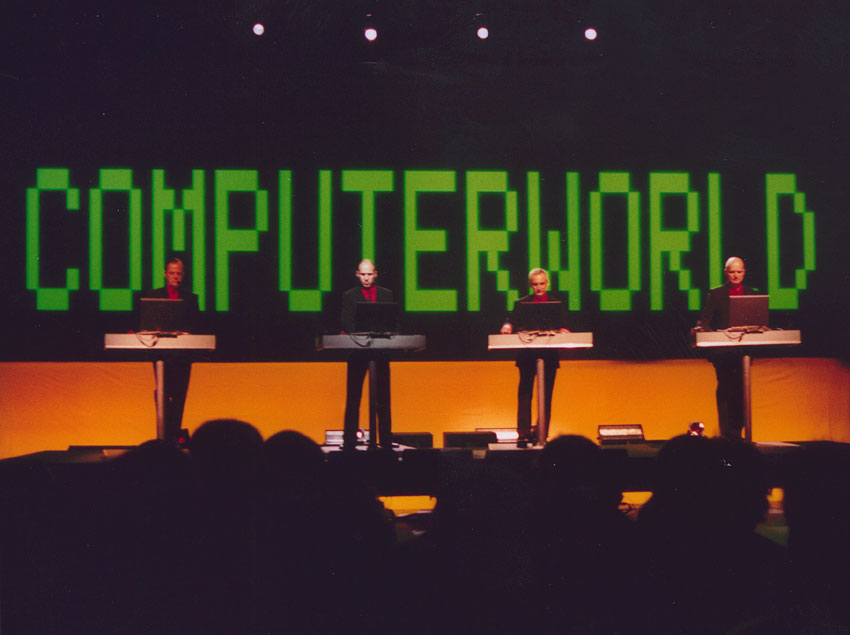
Coldplay received permission from Kraftwerk to use the main riff from "Computer Love" for the track "Talk".

The music of X&Y consists of multi-layered production with heavy electronic influences, featuring the extensive use of synthesisers. Musical characteristics that contribute to the album's multi-layering and grandiosity include fast tempos (in contrast to the two previous albums), dynamic drum patterns, distorted guitar riffs, and driving basslines.

Coldplay have also cited various other influences in the album. That of German electronic music pioneers Kraftwerk is evident on the song "Talk", which borrows (with permission) its hook from 1981's "Computer Love", with the riff played on electric guitar instead of on a synthesiser. Also present is large electronic musical influences, from some of the likes of English musicians David Bowie and Brian Eno. Eno, who would later produce Viva la Vida or Death and All His Friends, played backing synthesiser on the track "Low". The first single, "Speed of Sound", also takes inspiration from the drumbeat of English singer-songwriter Kate Bush's song "Running Up that Hill". According to Jon Pareles of The New York Times, who wrote an article criticizing the album, the band attempts to "carry the beauty of 'Clocks'" across the album, borrowing some of its features in songs like "Speed of Sound". The opening track "Square One" also features the motif from Also sprach Zarathustra, known better as the title theme of Stanley Kubrick's 1968 science-fiction film 2001: A Space Odyssey. The three-note sequence is replicated in the song by distorted guitar riffs, with a backing synthesiser added for musical texture. The sequence also transitions as a part of the song's chorus, showcasing Chris Martin's trademark falsetto.

"Fix You" features an organ and piano sound. The song starts with a hushed electronic organ ballad, including Martin's falsetto. The song then builds with both an acoustic guitar and piano sound. The sound then shifts with a plaintive three-note guitar line, ringing through a bringing rhythm upbeat tempo. Its instrumentation is varied with the sound of church-style organs hovering throughout the background, piano notes, acoustic and electric guitar riffs, drums, bass guitar, and a singalong chorus. "The Hardest Part" features a faster piano ballad sound, and starts with a repeating two-note piano riff, and features an instrumentation of a singsong guitar. It is mid-tempo, with a laid back, steady rhythm. The track ends with the band playing some repeated riffs as it fades out. "Speed of Sound" is musically centered around an ornate keyboard riff and features a busy chorus, during which the song builds into a huge drum beat surrounded by synthesized sounds. The song is upbeat, with a driving bassline and echoing, distorted guitar riffs being heard throughout. Kevin Devine from Hybrid Magazine wrote that Buckland's "gleaming guitar sound gives X&Y a euphonic radiance", and thematically, the album contains a "running thread of importance of trying, as well as the need for basic communication amongst the cacophony of confusion in the world".

=== Lyrics ===
Lyrically, X&Y made an apparent shift from its predecessors, with many lyrics focused on a questioning and philosophical view of the world. On their previous works, Martin sang mostly in the first person "I", but here moves to the second person "you". Accordingly, the songs on the album are a reflection of Martin's "doubts, fears, hopes, and loves" with lyrics that are "earnest and vague".

== Artwork and packaging ==
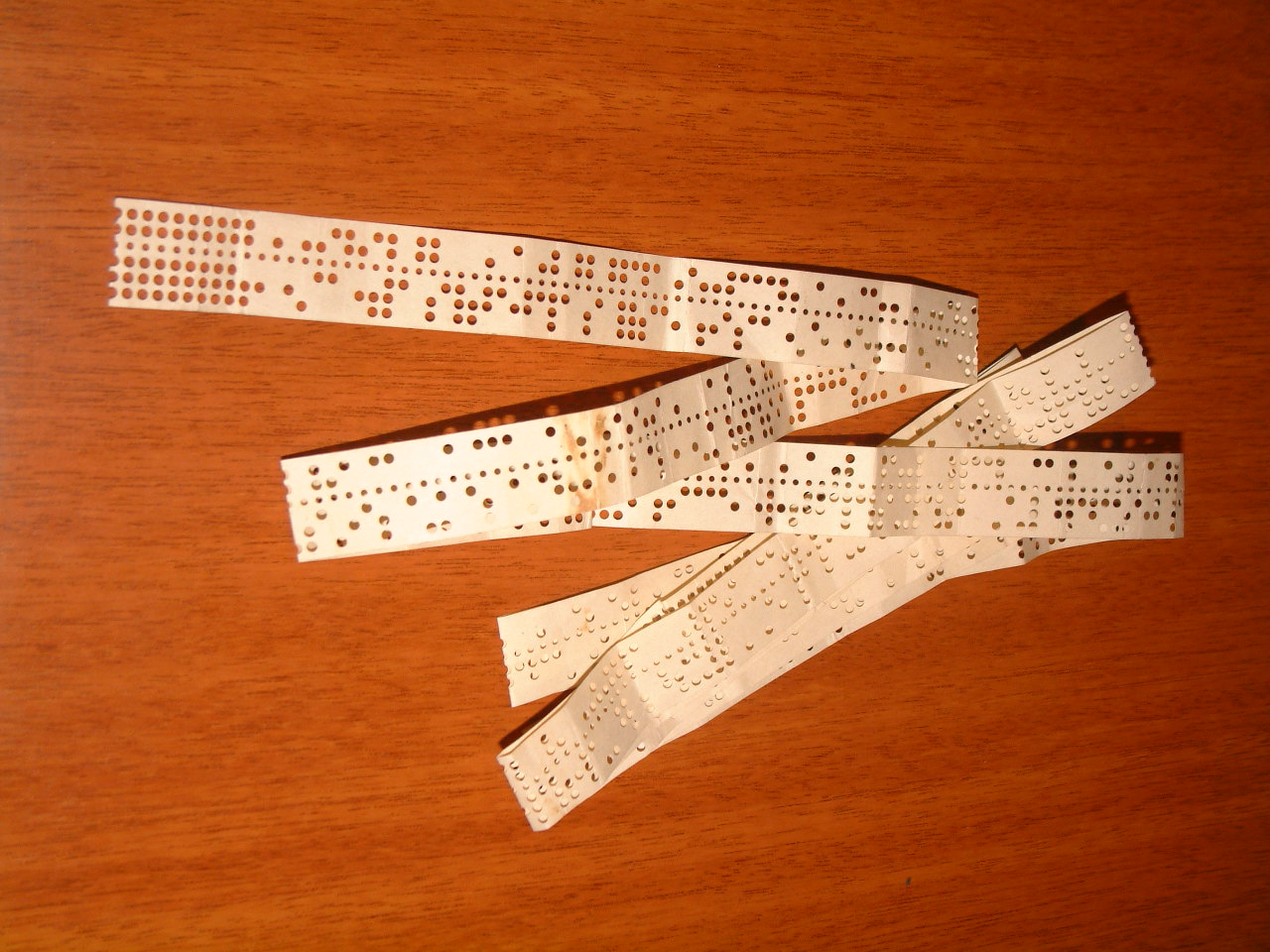
The Baudot code was used for X&Y's artwork.

The artwork for X&Y was designed by graphic design duo Tappin Gofton, formed by Mark Tappin and Simon Gofton; Mark Tappin had previously worked for Coldplay on the covers for Parachutes and its associated singles. The image, which is visualised through a combination of colours and blocks, is a graphical representation of the Baudot code, an early form of telegraph communication using a series of ones and zeros to communicate. The code was developed by Frenchman Émile Baudot in the 1870s, and was a widely used method of terrestrial and telegraph communication.

The alphabet of the code is presented in the liner notes of X&Y. The track listing, included on the booklet, CD, and back of the album, uses "X#" on tracks 1 to 6 and "Y#" on tracks 7 to 12, rather than the conventional track numbering system. Many pages in the booklet include photos of the band working on the album. The final page of the booklet contains the slogan "Make Trade Fair" in the Baudot code, a reference to the name of the international organisation which Chris Martin continues to support. The band also dedicates the album to "BWP" in the liner notes; it stands for Bruce W. Paltrow, the late father of Martin's wife at the time, Gwyneth Paltrow. All singles released from the album feature their titles in the same code on their respective covers.

== Release and promotion ==
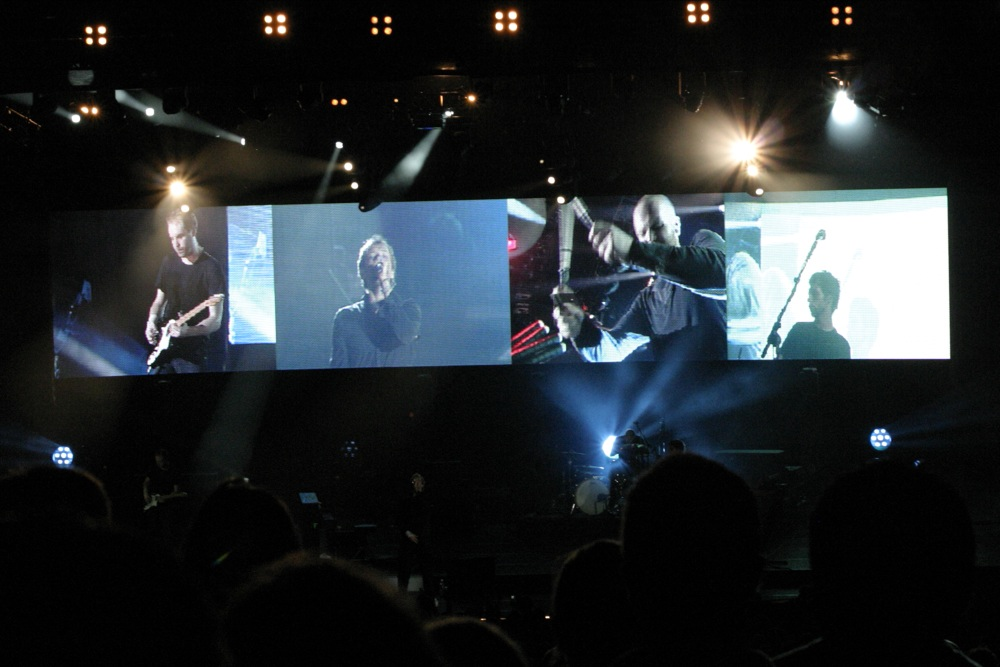
The Twisted Logic Tour promoted X&Y from 2005 to 2006.

X&Y was initially intended for a 2004 release, although early news reported it would not be released until 2005; because of personal preferences, songs recorded in several sessions were scrapped and doing so had pushed the expected release date to January 2005. However, the new date went by and the band had to decide on another schedule. By early 2005 the album, rumoured to be called Zero Theory, had a target release date between March and May 2005. By early April the band had finalised the track listing of the album. The album was finally released on 6 June 2005 in the United Kingdom via record label Parlophone. It was issued on 7 June in the United States by Capitol. It has been released with the Copy Control protection system in some regions. Capitol released a remastered version of the album in 2008, on two 180-gram vinyl records, as part of the "From the Capitol Vaults" series.

Around three months prior to the album release, Coldplay began performing several songs from X&Y during live performances. The band made a headlining performance at public radio station KCRW-FM's annual A Sounds Eclectic Evening, playing five new songs and some of their old favourites.

The album has four main singles that were released internationally: "Speed of Sound", "Fix You", and "Talk" in 2005, and "The Hardest Part" in 2006. A promotional single, "What If", was released in June 2006 to radio stations in France and the French-speaking portions of Belgium and Switzerland. A commercial CD was also released in Belgium and features the same B-side as "The Hardest Part" ("How You See the World" recorded live at Earls Court), which was released in other European markets as well as Japan and Australia. This single features the "Tom Lord-Alge Mix" as the A-side, which differs from the album version.

The track "A Message" was featured in episodes of Electric Dreams, One Tree Hill, and Smallville. The hidden track "Til Kingdom Come" is featured in The Shield season 5 premiere, a season 1 episode of Jericho, and in the superhero film The Amazing Spider-Man (2012). In addition, Chris Martin performed an acoustic rendition of the track at the funeral of former Attorney General of Delaware Beau Biden on 6 June 2015, accompanied by a church organ. The band also played "Fix You" together at Apple's memorial for Steve Jobs in 2011, alongside some of their other songs.

== Critical reception ==
=== Reviews ===
Professional ratings
Aggregate scores
Source	Rating
Metacritic	72/100
Review scores
Source	Rating
AllMusic	4/5 stars
Blender	5/5 stars
Entertainment Weekly	B
The Guardian	3/5 stars
NME	9/10
Pitchfork	4.9/10
Q	5/5 stars
Rolling Stone	3/5 stars
Spin	B+
The Village Voice	B

X&Y received generally positive reviews from music critics. At Metacritic, which assigns a normalised rating out of 100 to reviews from mainstream critics, the album received an average score of 72, based on 33 reviews. Blender hailed it as Coldplay's "masterpiece." NME described it as "confident, bold, ambitious, bunged with singles and impossible to contain," and added that it reinforces Coldplay as "the band of their time". Q magazine found it "substantially more visceral and emotionally rewarding experience than both its predecessors." James Hunter of The Village Voice said that it is remarkably "accomplished, fresh, and emotional". Uncut assertively called it "an exceptional pop record". Spin magazine's Mikael Wood praised Coldplay for "recasting their nerdy-student Britpop as Important Rock Music" without having to compromise Martin's unpretentious songwriting style. In his review for AllMusic, Stephen Thomas Erlewine praised it as "a good record, crisp, professional, and assured, a sonically satisfying sequel to A Rush of Blood to the Head", stating it as "impeccable" and "a strong, accomplished album".

In a less enthusiastic review for Entertainment Weekly, David Browne felt that Coldplay's attempt at more grandiose music works "only part of the time", even though he found their effort to mature commendable. Rhyannon Rodriguez from Kludge wrote that the album feels "a little forced", describing the overall sounds as "overtly weak". Alexis Petridis, writing in The Guardian, said that some of the songs are "mostly beautifully turned", but marred by lyrics that are "so devoid of personality that they sound less like song lyrics than something dreamed up by a creative at [an] ad agency". Pitchfork's Joe Tangari called it "bland but never offensive, listenable but not memorable." Mojo wrote that the album is "awash with cliches, non-sequiturs, and cheap existentialism; at times it all becomes nigh on unbearable". In a negative review for The Village Voice, Robert Christgau named X&Y "dud of the month" and called Coldplay a "precise, bland, and banal" band, giving the album a B grade.

The band has received some criticism for the similarities between "Speed of Sound" and "Clocks", one of the band's most popular songs. Kelefa Sanneh of Rolling Stone was less contented with X&Y in comparison to A Rush of Blood to the Head, arguing that "the sound of a blown-up band trying not to deflate" and "a surprising number of songs here just never take flight". Despite such, he compliments the album for having "lovely ballads that sound, well, Coldplay-ish". Billboard included "Til Kingdom Come" on their 40 Best Deep Cuts of 2005 list at number 25, complimenting the combination of Johnny Cash's style with the group's own.

=== Rankings ===
List of critic rankings
Publication	Year	Description	Result	Ref.
Blender	2005	Best of 2005	8	
E! Online	2005	Replay 2005 – Top 20 CDs	10	
Loudwire	2025	The Best Alt-Rock Album of Each Year of the 2000s	Placed	
Mojo	2005	Albums of the Year 2005	37	
NME	2005	Best Albums of 2005	19	
The Observer	2005	Top 100 Albums of 2005	18	
Q	2005	Recordings of the Year 2005	1	
Q	2016	The Greatest Albums of the Last 30 Years	Placed	
Radio X	2023	The 25 Best Albums of 2005	Placed	
The Standard	2025	The Best Albums of 2005	Placed	
The Telegraph	2005	The Greatest Albums of the Year 2005	17	
Uncut	2024	The 500 Greatest Albums of the 2000s	378	
The Village Voice	2005	Pazz & Jop Critics Poll	32	
WXPN	2021	All Time Greatest Albums	659	

== Accolades ==
List of awards and nominations
Year	Ceremony	Category	Result	Ref.
2005	Bizarre Awards	Best Album	Won	
2005	Fryderyk Awards	Best Foreign Album	Won	
2005	Gaffa Awards (Denmark)	International Album of the Year	Won	
2005	IFPI Hong Kong Top Sales Awards	Top 10 Best-Selling Foreign Albums	Won	
2005	Mercury Prize	Album of the Year	Nominated	
2005	MTV Europe Music Awards	Best Album	Nominated	
2005	Premios Oye!	English Album of the Year	Won	
2005	Q Awards	Best Album	Nominated	
2005	Rockbjörnen Awards	Best International Album	Nominated	
2005	RTHK International Pop Poll Awards	Best-Selling Album	Won	
2006	Brit Awards	British Album of the Year	Won	
2006	Edison Awards	Best International Group Album	Won	
2006	Grammy Awards	Best Rock Album	Nominated	
2006	Hungarian Music Awards	Foreign Modern Rock Album of the Year	Nominated	
2006	IFPI Awards	Global Album of 2005	Won	
2006	Juno Awards	International Album of the Year	Won	
2006	Meteor Music Awards	Best International Album	Nominated	
2006	NRJ Music Awards	International Album of the Year	Nominated	
2006	Žebřík Music Awards	Best Foreign Album	1st place	

== Commercial performance ==
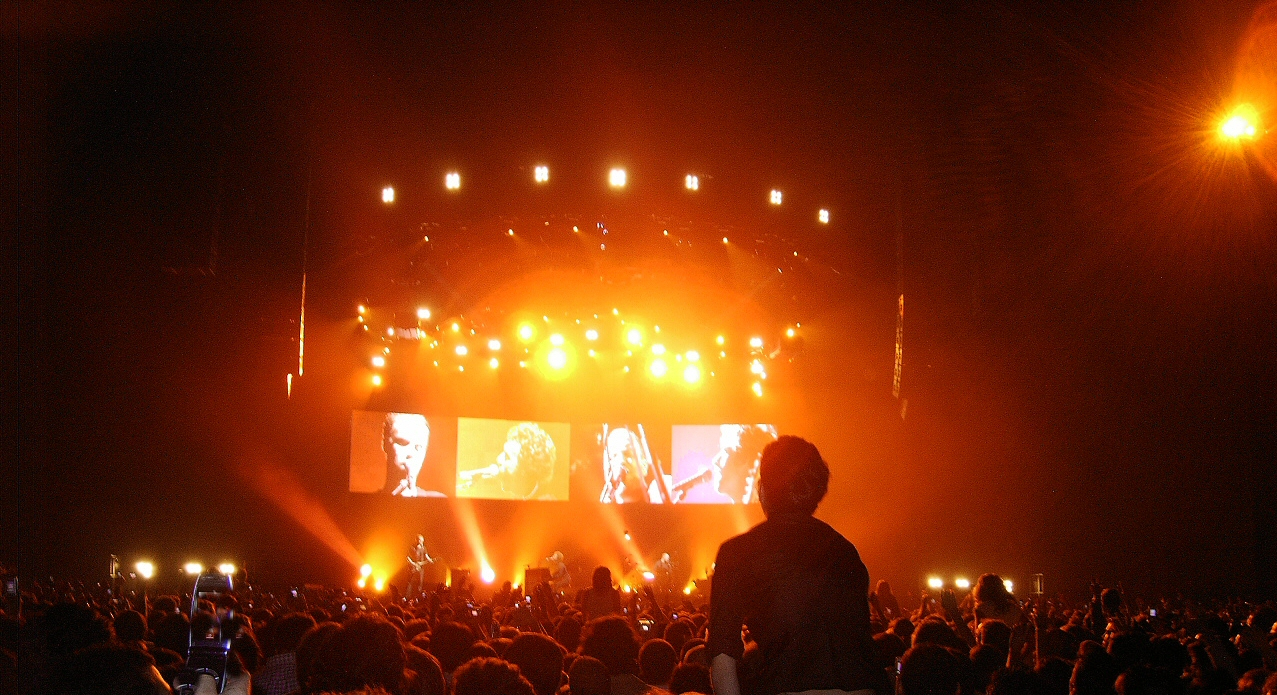
Coldplay performing at Pavilhão Atlântico, Lisbon, Portugal during the Twisted Logic Tour, 2005

Despite leaking online before release, X&Y reached number one in 32 countries. EMI shipped over 5 million copies of the album in its first week worldwide. It led the charts in all 19 territories covered by iTunes. Coldplay had the best-selling record of the year as a result, shifting 8.3 million units against a 3% decline in overall sales across the music industry. The band also hit number one on the UK Albums Chart with 464,471 copies, which made X&Y the third-fastest-seller in British history at the time. As of 2025, it ranks at sixth place, behind releases from Take That, the Beatles, Ed Sheeran, Oasis and Adele.

The record has spent 13 consecutive weeks atop the European Top 100 Albums chart, between June and August 2005. In July 2013, the British Phonographic Industry (BPI) certified it 9× Platinum. In March 2016, Music Week ranked X&Y at ninth place on its "Biggest-Selling Albums of the 21st Century" list. The album has sold over 2.8 million units in Britain, becoming Coldplay's second most successful album, following A Rush of Blood to the Head (2002).

In the United States, the American press considered X&Y a landmark achievement for the band. The album debuted at number one on the Billboard 200 with 737,294 copies sold during a competitive retail season, including releases from Black Eyed Peas, Shakira and the White Stripes. Coldplay had the largest first-week sales for a new release at Capitol. They spent three weeks atop the Billboard 200, marking the longest stay for a British group since the Beatles in December 2000 and January 2001. X&Y was certified 3× Platinum by the Recording Industry Association of America (RIAA) for three million shipments. In Canada, the album debuted at number one with 105,000 copies, doubling the previous biggest debut of the year. In Japan, it debuted at number six on the Oricon Albums Chart with 32,347 copies sold.

== Legacy ==
Discussing the album on Pitchfork, Paul de Revere credited it with solidifying Coldplay's status as one of the biggest rock groups in the world. On the other hand, Carl Williott from Idolator mentioned that "in the garage rock-reviving times of 2005, flaws were still a marker of authenticity for guitar-wielding acts, so the clinical and calibrated richness of X&Y was immensely uncool" upon release, which made the band a subject of backlash. Stereogum's Ryan Leas said that "the original Coldplay template" reached its logical endpoint with the album, leading to the experimental approach of Viva la Vida or Death and All His Friends (2008). In 2017, the album was added to V&A Museum's collection.

The members of Coldplay have spoken several times over the years about their dissatisfaction of X&Y. Martin commented he wants to remake it. He also stated that "[X&Y] has some good melodies and some good songs. But we failed, basically, on that whole album to get any of them produced right or edited right. It's too long. There's too many songs. I'm singing about the same thing too much". "Speed of Sound" and "Talk" have been singled out as two songs members of the band dislike. Conversely, the singer declared he is proud of "Fix You" because it helped the band through "a really difficult two years". Bassist Guy Berryman also said X&Y would benefit from being edited again. Guitarist Jonny Buckland described the American leg of the Twisted Logic Tour as the lowest point of their career, as they were "quite miserable" and "confused".

== Track listing ==
All tracks are written by Coldplay, with co-production from Danton Supple and Ken Nelson, except where noted.

No.	Title	Writer(s)	Length
1.	"Square One"		4:47
2.	"What If"		4:57
3.	"White Shadows"		5:28
4.	"Fix You"		4:54
5.	"Talk"	Coldplay; Ralf Hütter; Karl Bartos; Emil Schult	5:11
6.	"X&Y"		4:34
7.	"Speed of Sound"		4:48
8.	"A Message"		4:45
9.	"Low"		5:32
10.	"The Hardest Part"		4:25
11.	"Swallowed in the Sea"		3:58
12.	"Twisted Logic"		5:01

Hidden track
No.	Title	Length
13.	"Til Kingdom Come"	4:10
Total length:		62:30

Japanese edition first pressing bonus track
No.	Title	Length
14.	"How You See the World"	4:04
Total length:		66:34

Notes

- Tracks 1–6 are grouped under X, while tracks 7–13 are grouped under Y.
- "Twisted Logic" ends at 4:31 on physical editions, followed by 30 seconds of silence. This is omitted on the streaming version.
- "Til Kingdom Come" is labelled solely as "+" in the liner notes.

Sample credits

- "Talk" contains a sample of "Computer Love" (written by Ralf Hütter, Karl Bartos and Emil Schult).

=== Tour edition DVD ===
Released to promote the album during Twisted Logic Tour's visit to Australia, Southeast Asia and Latin America. Includes all the single B-sides and music videos on a bonus DVD.

Audio only section
No.	Title	Length
1.	"Things I Don't Understand"	4:55
2.	"Proof"	4:10
3.	"The World Turned Upside Down"	4:33
4.	"Pour Me" (Live at the Hollywood Bowl)	5:01
5.	"Sleeping Sun"	3:09
6.	"Gravity"	6:18

Audiovisual section
No.	Title	Length
1.	"Speed of Sound" (video)	4:28
2.	"Fix You" (video)	4:54
3.	"Talk" (video)	4:58
4.	"The Hardest Part" (video)	4:51
5.	"X&Y Track-by-track interview"	16:02

=== Other editions ===
In addition a rare "Japan Tour Special Edition" (Cat. No. TOCP-66523) was released in 2006. This is the only "Tour Edition" which has the bonus disc as a CD (CD extra) (Cat. No. NCD-3013), and without Copy Control. All other "Tour Editions" have Copy Control protection. The track listing is exactly the same as in other "Tour Editions". Along with the tour editions, there was also a "Special Dutch Edition", released only in The Netherlands. It consisted of 2 discs, the first containing the entirety of X&Y, and the second containing the B-sides from the tour editions. No audiovisual content was included.

== Personnel ==
Adapted from AllMusic.

Coldplay

- Chris Martin – lead vocals; piano, acoustic guitar, keyboards, organ, rhythm guitar (track 9)
- Jonny Buckland – lead guitar, backing vocals (track 4)
- Guy Berryman – bass guitar, backing vocals, synthesiser; harmonica (track 13)
- Will Champion – drums, backing vocals; piano (track 13)

Production and design

- Chris Athens – mastering
- Jon Bailey – assistant
- Michael Brauer – mixing
- Coldplay – audio production, photography, producer
- Susan Dench – strings
- Brian Eno – synthesiser (track 9)
- Keith Gary – digital editing, Pro Tools HD
- Richard George – strings
- Tappin Gofton – art direction, design
- William Paden Hensley – assistant
- Jake Jackson – assistant
- Peter Lale – strings
- Mathieu Lejeune – assistant
- Anne Lines – strings
- George Marino – mastering
- Taz Mattar – assistant
- Matt McGinn – guitar technician
- Laura Melhuish – strings
- Ken Nelson – audio production, engineer, producer (tracks 3, 4, 12, 13)
- Adam Noble – assistant
- Mike Pierce – assistant
- Dan Porter – assistant
- Danny Porter – assistant
- Mark Pythian – computer editing
- Audrey Riley – string arrangements, strings
- Carmen Rizzo – computer editing
- Tim Roe – assistant
- Bryan Russell – assistant
- Tom Sheehan – photography
- Robert Smith – assistant, computers
- Danton Supple – audio production, producer (except on tracks 3, 4, 12, 13)
- Christopher Tombling – strings
- Kevin Westenberg – photography
- Estelle Wilkinson – management
- Andrea Wright – assistant

== Charts ==
=== Weekly charts ===
Weekly chart performance
Chart (2005–2017)	Peak position
Argentine Albums (CAPIF)	1
Australian Albums (ARIA)	1
Austrian Albums (Ö3 Austria)	1
Belgian Albums (Ultratop Flanders)	1
Belgian Albums (Ultratop Wallonia)	1
Brazilian Albums (ABPD)	9
Canadian Albums (Billboard)	1
Chilean Albums (IFPI)	1
Croatian International Albums (HDU)	14
Czech Albums (ČNS IFPI)	8
Danish Albums (Hitlisten)	1
Dutch Albums (Album Top 100)	1
European Top 100 Albums (Billboard)	1
Finnish Albums (Suomen virallinen lista)	1
French Albums (SNEP)	1
German Albums (Offizielle Top 100)	1
Greek Albums (IFPI)	1
Hong Kong Albums (HKRMA)	1
Hungarian Albums (MAHASZ)	13
Icelandic Albums (Tónlistinn)	1
Irish Albums (IRMA)	1
Italian Albums (FIMI)	1
Japanese Albums (Oricon)	6
Japanese Top Albums Sales (Billboard Japan)	95
Mexican Albums (Top 100 Mexico)	1
New Zealand Albums (RMNZ)	1
Norwegian Albums (VG-lista)	1
Polish Albums (ZPAV)	3
Portuguese Albums (AFP)	1
Scottish Albums (Official Charts)	1
Slovak Albums (ČNS IFPI)	50
South Korean International Albums (Gaon)	22
Spanish Albums (Promusicae)	2
Swedish Albums (Sverigetopplistan)	1
Swiss Albums (Schweizer Hitparade)	1
Taiwanese Albums (Five Music)	1
UK Albums (Official Charts)	1
US Billboard 200	1
US Top Catalog Albums (Billboard)	1
US Top Rock Albums (Billboard)	11

=== Monthly charts ===
Monthly chart performance
Chart (2005–2006)	Peak position
Argentine Albums (CAPIF)	4
Japanese Albums (Oricon)	12
South Korean International Albums (MIAK)	4
Uruguayan Albums (CUD)	5

=== Year-end charts ===
Year-end chart performance
Chart (2005)	Position
Argentine Albums (CAPIF)	4
Australian Albums (ARIA)	8
Austrian Albums (Ö3 Austria)	8
Belgian Albums (Ultratop Flanders)	1
Belgian Alternative Albums (Ultratop Flanders)	1
Belgian Albums (Ultratop Wallonia)	8
Danish Albums (Hitlisten)	11
Dutch Albums (Album Top 100)	5
European Albums (Billboard)	3
Finnish Albums (Suomen viralinen lista)	7
French Albums (SNEP)	25
German Albums (Offizielle Top 100)	6
Irish Albums (IRMA)	5
Italian Albums (FIMI)	16
Japanese Albums (Oricon)	90
Mexican Albums (Top 100 Mexico)	30
New Zealand Albums (RMNZ)	3
South Korean International Albums (MIAK)	26
Spanish Albums (Promusicae)	23
Swedish Albums (Sverigetopplistan)	15
Swedish Albums & Compilations (Sverigetopplistan)	16
Swiss Albums (Schweizer Hitparade)	2
UK Albums (OCC)	2
US Billboard 200	14
Worldwide Albums (IFPI)	1

Chart (2006)	Position
Australian Albums (ARIA)	26
Austrian Albums (Ö3 Austria)	50
Belgian Albums (Ultratop Flanders)	17
Belgian Albums (Ultratop Wallonia)	72
Belgian Alternative Albums (Ultratop Flanders)	10
Danish Albums (Hitlisten)	55
Dutch Albums (Album Top 100)	52
European Albums (Billboard)	14
French Albums (SNEP)	72
German Albums (Offizielle Top 100)	37
Italian Albums (FIMI)	54
Swedish Albums (Sverigetopplistan)	42
Swedish Albums & Compilations (Sverigetopplistan)	51
Swiss Albums (Schweizer Hitparade)	68
UK Albums (OCC)	49
US Billboard 200	89

Chart (2007)	Position
Belgian Midprice Albums (Ultratop Flanders)	10
Belgian Midprice Albums (Ultratop Wallonia)	5
UK Albums (OCC)	190

Chart (2008)	Position
Belgian Midprice Albums (Ultratop Flanders)	30
Belgian Midprice Albums (Ultratop Wallonia)	14
UK Albums (OCC)	195

Chart (2009)	Position
Belgian Midprice Albums (Ultratop Wallonia)	49

=== Decade-end charts ===
Decade-end chart performance
Chart (2000–2009)	Position
Australian Albums (ARIA)	38
Dutch Albums (Album Top 100)	23
UK Albums (OCC)	12
US Billboard 200	130

== Certifications and sales ==
Certifications and sales
Region	Certification	Certified units/sales
Argentina (CAPIF)	5× Platinum	200,000^{^}
Australia (ARIA)	6× Platinum	420,000^{^}
Austria (IFPI Austria)	Platinum	30,000^{*}
Belgium (BRMA)	2× Platinum	100,000^{*}
Brazil (Pro-Música Brasil)	Gold	50,000^{*}
Canada (Music Canada)	5× Platinum	500,000^{^}
Chile (IFPI Chile)	Platinum	15,000 (Note: Chilean certified sales for X&Y as of December 2011.)
Denmark (IFPI Danmark)	7× Platinum	140,000^{‡}
Finland (Musiikkituottajat)	Platinum	34,222 (Note: Finnish total sales for X&Y as of December 2006.)
France (SNEP)	2× Platinum	400,000^{*}
Germany (BVMI)	3× Platinum	600,000^{^}
Greece (IFPI Greece)	Gold	10,000^{^}
Hong Kong (IFPI Hong Kong)	3× Platinum	60,000^{*}
Iceland	—	2,500 (Note: Icelandic total sales for X&Y as of July 2005.)
India (IMI)	Platinum	20,000 (Note: Indian certified sales for X&Y as of January 2007.)
Indonesia (ASIRI)	Platinum	50,000 (Note: Indonesian certified sales for X&Y as of January 2007.)
Ireland (IRMA)	8× Platinum	120,000^{^}
Italy	—	181,000 (Note: Italian year-end sales for X&Y in 2005.)
Italy (FIMI) Sales since 2009	Platinum	50,000^{‡}
Japan (RIAJ)	Gold	199,056 (Note: Japanese physical sales for X&Y as of February 2009.)
Malaysia (RIM)	2× Platinum	50,000 (Note: Malaysian certified sales for X&Y as of January 2007.)
Mexico (AMPROFON)	Platinum	100,000^{^}
Netherlands (NVPI)	Platinum	80,000^{^}
New Zealand (RMNZ)	6× Platinum	90,000^{^}
Philippines (PARI)	Platinum	30,000^{*}
Portugal (AFP)	2× Platinum	40,000^{^}
Russia (NFPF)	Gold	10,000^{*}
Singapore (RIAS)	4× Platinum	60,000^{*}
South Korea	—	15,132 (Note: South Korean year-end sales for X&Y in 2005.)
Spain (Promusicae)	2× Platinum	200,000^{^}
Sweden (GLF)	Platinum	60,000^{^}
Switzerland (IFPI Switzerland)	2× Platinum	80,000^{^}
Taiwan (RIT)	Gold	10,000^{*}
Thailand (TECA)	Gold	20,000 (Note: Thai certified sales for X&Y as of January 2007.)
United Kingdom (BPI)	9× Platinum	2,829,776 (Note: British total sales for X&Y as of October 2021.)
United States (RIAA)	3× Platinum	3,158,000 (Note: American total sales for X&Y as of May 2008.)
Summaries
Europe (IFPI)	5× Platinum	5,000,000^{*}
^{*} Sales figures based on certification alone.^{^} Shipments figures based on certification alone.^{‡} Sales+streaming figures based on certification alone.

== See also ==
- 2005 in British music
- List of fastest-selling albums
- List of best-selling albums of the 21st century
- List of best-selling albums in Belgium
- List of best-selling albums in Europe
- List of best-selling albums in Ireland
- List of best-selling albums in the United Kingdom
- List of number-one albums in Argentina
- List of number-one albums in Hong Kong
- List of number-one albums in Norway
- List of Billboard 200 number-one albums of 2005
- List of number-one albums of 2005 (Australia)
- List of number-one albums of 2005 (Canada)
- List of number-one albums of 2005 (Ireland)
- List of number-one albums of 2005 (Mexico)
- List of number-one albums of 2005 (Portugal)
- List of number-one hits of 2005 (Europe)
- List of number-one hits of 2005 (Austria)
- List of number-one hits of 2005 (France)
- List of number-one hits of 2005 (Germany)
- List of number-one hits of 2005 (Italy)
- List of number-one hits of 2005 (Sweden)
- List of number-one hits of 2005 (Switzerland)
- List of number-one albums from the 2000s (Denmark)
- List of number-one albums from the 2000s (New Zealand)
- List of UK Albums Chart number ones of the 2000s
