= YX =

Yx or YX may refer to:

- Yx (digraph), in the Nambikwara language
- YX Energi, a Scandinavian fuel station chain
- Midwest Airlines (former IATA code: YX)
- Republic Airways (current IATA code: YX)
- Yahoo!Xtra, a defunct New Zealand web portal

== See also ==
- XY (disambiguation)
