= The Hardest Part (Coldplay song) =

2006 single by Coldplay

Single by Coldplay

from the album X&Y
- B-side: "How You See the World" (live)
- Released: 3 April 2006
- Genre: Pop rock
- Length: 4:25
- Label: Parlophone; Capitol
- Songwriters: Guy Berryman; Jonny Buckland; Will Champion; Chris Martin
- Producers: Danton Supple; Coldplay

Coldplay singles chronology
"Talk" (2005)	"The Hardest Part" (2006)	"Violet Hill" (2008)

Music video
- "The Hardest Part" on YouTube

"The Hardest Part" is a song by British rock band Coldplay. It was written by all four members of the band for their third album, X&Y (2005). A piano-based song, it begins with a piano melody, followed with electric guitar lines, that accompanies slow-tempo drumming.

It was released on 3 April 2006 as the fourth and final single from X&Y. The song was released as a radio-only song on United Kingdom radio stations. It appeared on the United States Billboard Hot Adult Contemporary Tracks chart and peaked at number 37, making it Coldplay's first appearance on that chart and helping establish moderate success at AC radio for future singles like "Viva la Vida", "Paradise", and "Every Teardrop Is a Waterfall". "The Hardest Part" also charted in Australia, Italy and New Zealand.

The song was well received by critics. The track was complimented for its musical style. Regional singles were released in Canada, Europe, and Australia; a different version was released in Taiwan. Promo singles were released for the UK and US. The international version of the single was made available in the UK on 19 June 2006.

== Production and composition ==
The previous single from X&Y, "Talk", was a tribute to the German band Kraftwerk; similarly, "The Hardest Part" was intended by Coldplay to acknowledge American band R.E.M. When asked why the song paid a tribute to R.E.M.'s lead singer, Michael Stipe, Chris Martin said: "I've lost all respect for fame, but I haven't lost all respect for respect. So the one great thing about being famous is that I get to meet people who I respect. Our relationship is akin to a dog and its master. I'll always look up to him". The band felt the track resembled R.E.M.'s 1991 single, "Losing My Religion". "The Hardest Part" was left out of the album track list when the band sent an early version of X&Y to their record label, Parlophone, but was included when the album was finalised.

== Release and reception ==
Coldplay released "The Hardest Part" in the US and UK on 3 April 2006 and in Japan on 24 May as the fourth single from X&Y. The single was pressed with a B-side, "How You See the World", recorded live at Earls Court. The international version of the single was made available in the UK on 19 June 2006. Regional singles were released for Canada, Europe, Australia, and a different version for Taiwan. The track peaked at number 37 on Billboard's Hot Adult Contemporary Tracks chart. Although the song did not chart on the UK Singles Chart, as the song was released as a radio-only song, the single peaked on the Italian charts on 11 May 2006 at number 19 and spent a week in the chart. Afterward, the song peaked on the New Zealand Singles Chart at number 28 on 28 August 2006. A live piano version of "The Hardest Part", paired with the Prospekt's March track "Postcards from Far Away", appeared on Coldplay's 2009 live album LeftRightLeftRightLeft.

Critics were positive towards the song. In the Entertainment Weekly review of the album, music contributor David Browne wrote that the song "is imbued with the sense of regret and letting go that we've heard from the band before, but with added musical muscle." Michael Hubbard of MusicOMH wrote: "'A Message' and 'The Hardest Part' sound like companion pieces, both big songs." Critic Kelefa Sanneh of Rolling Stone noted that the song gets "less catchy as it goes along". Adrien Begrand from PopMatters wrote that "The Hardest Part" is a "pleasant slice of R.E.M. style pop." Cameron Adams of the Herald Sun reported that the song sounded "like the Smiths meets REM." David Cheal of The Daily Telegraph noted, "...'The Hardest Part' is lovely, straightforward, instantly accessible pop-rock".

== Music video ==
The music video for "The Hardest Part" was shot on 3 March 2006 in St. Petersburg, Florida. The video uses footage from the television series Attitudes, which aired on the Lifetime television network from 1985 to 1992. The video is digitally enhanced to appear as though Coldplay is performing the music alongside the act appearing on stage. American actress Linda Dano, who played Felicia Gallant on the US soap opera Another World, is also featured. The dancers on the stage are 84-year-old Barbara Moseley and 25-year-old Gene Spencer, whose performance was actually filmed in 1990. The music video was directed by Mary Wigmore.

== Track listings ==
European, Australian, and Japanese CD single
No.	Title	Length
1.	"The Hardest Part"	4:25
2.	"How You See the World" (live from Earls Court)	4:16

UK 7-inch vinyl (The Singles 1999–2006)
No.	Title	Length
1.	"The Hardest Part"	4:25
2.	"Pour Me" (live at the Hollywood Bowl)	5:01

== Personnel ==
- Chris Martin – vocals, piano, acoustic guitar, organ
- Guy Berryman – bass guitar
- Jonny Buckland – electric guitars
- Will Champion – drums, backing vocals

== Charts ==
=== Weekly charts ===
Weekly chart performance
Chart (2006)	Peak position
Australia (ARIA)	40
Belgium (Ultratop 50 Flanders)	48
Canada Hot AC Top 40 (Radio & Records)	6
CIS Airplay (TopHit)	138
Hungary (Editors' Choice Top 40)	35
Italy (FIMI)	19
Netherlands (Dutch Top 40)	25
Netherlands (Single Top 100)	39
New Zealand (Recorded Music NZ)	28
Slovakia Airplay (ČNS IFPI)	15
Switzerland (Schweizer Hitparade)	44
UK Singles Downloads (Official Charts)	56
US Adult Alternative Airplay (Billboard)	20
US Adult Contemporary (Billboard)	37

=== Year-end charts ===
Year-end chart performance
Chart (2006)	Position
Netherlands (Dutch Top 40)	162
