= Clocks (song) =

2003 single by Coldplay

Single by Coldplay

from the album A Rush of Blood to the Head
- B-side: "Crests of Waves"; "Animals"
- Released: 11 November 2002 (US); 17 March 2003 (UK)
- Recorded: May–July 2002
- Genre: Alternative rock; baroque pop; psychedelic rock
- Length: 5:07 (album version); 4:16 (radio edit)
- Label: Parlophone; Capitol
- Songwriters: Guy Berryman; Jonny Buckland; Will Champion; Chris Martin
- Producers: Ken Nelson; Coldplay

Coldplay singles chronology
"The Scientist" (2002)	"Clocks" (2002)	"God Put a Smile upon Your Face" (2003)

Music video
- "Clocks" on YouTube

"Clocks" is a song by the British rock band Coldplay. It was released on 17 March 2003 by Parlophone in the United Kingdom. It was written and composed as a collaboration among all the members of the band for their second album, A Rush of Blood to the Head. The song is built around a piano riff, and features cryptic lyrics concerning themes of contrast and urgency. Several remixes of the track exist, and its riff has been widely sampled.

The record was initially released in the United States as the album's second single on 11 November 2002, reaching number 29 on the Billboard Hot 100 and number nine on the Billboard Modern Rock Tracks chart. It was then released in the United Kingdom on 17 March 2003 as the third single from A Rush of Blood to the Head, reaching number nine on the UK Singles Chart. Music critics praised the song's piano melody, and it went on to win Record of the Year at the 2004 Grammy Awards.

"Clocks" is considered to be one of Coldplay's signature songs, and is often ranked among the greatest songs of the 2000s and of all time. In 2010, the single was placed at 490th on Rolling Stone's "500 Greatest Songs of All Time" list. In 2011, NME placed it amongst the "150 Best Tracks of the Past 15 Years".

== Recording ==
"Clocks" was written and composed during the late stages of production of Coldplay's second album, A Rush of Blood to the Head. A riff popped into Chris Martin's mind late one night in Liverpool when he came into the studio, where he then developed it on piano. According to singer Chris Martin, "Clocks" was inspired by the English rock band Muse. Martin presented the riff to the band's guitarist, Jonny Buckland, who then added a layer of guitar chords to the basic track: "He picked up his guitar [a sure sign that he likes a song] and played these brilliant chords ... It was like a chemical reaction process."

Before writing and composing "Clocks", the band had already written ten songs for the album. However, because A Rush of Blood to the Head was nearing completion, they thought it was too late to include the new song on it. Hence, they recorded a demo and saved it with other unfinished tracks, labelling it "Songs for #3"; the band intended these tracks for what would be their third album (which would eventually become the 2005 album X&Y).

By June 2002, Coldplay were ready to present the new album to their record label Parlophone. However, Martin felt it was "rubbish" and that the band were far from being completely satisfied with the album, so the release was ultimately delayed. After a headlining tour, Coldplay went on working on their third album. Phil Harvey, the band's manager and a friend of Martin, heard it and pressed him to rework "Clocks" immediately. Harvey pointed out that, with its lyrics that speak of urgency, its meaning contradicted Martin's idea of stashing the track. The singer further developed the song while the other band members supplemented his work with their ideas based on the main piano track, adding the guitars, bass and drums. After "Clocks" was finished, Harvey came up with the track's outro, but since he could not play guitar, he whistled the melody to guitarist Jonny Buckland. Coldplay recorded the song very quickly because the schedule of A Rush of Blood to the Head had already been delayed; the album was released two months later.

== Composition ==
"Clocks" is an alternative rock and psychedelic rock song. It features a repeating piano melody and a minimalist, atmospheric soundscape of synthesizer pads, drums, electric guitar, and bass guitar. Martin applied an ostinato, as well as a descending scale on the piano chord progression, which switches from major to minor chords.

The themes of the lyrics include contrast, contradictions and urgency. According to Jon Wiederhon of MTV News, "Martin seems to address the helplessness of being in a dysfunctional relationship he doesn't necessarily want to escape." The lyrics are cryptic; the ending lines of the second verse emphasise contradicting emotion: "Come out upon my seas/Cursed missed opportunities/Am I a part of the cure/Or am I part of the disease?" The song's title also "metaphorically alludes" to its lyrics, "pushing one to wonder about the world's obsession with time while connecting it to the theory: make the best of it when we’re here, present and alive."

The song is written in the key of E♭ Mixolydian and a main chord progression of E♭–B♭m–Fm. E♭ Mixolydian is the fifth mode of A♭ major leading to some transcriptions using this key.

== Release ==
Coldplay released "Clocks" in the United Kingdom on 24 March 2003 as the album's third single. The single was issued with two B-sides: "Animals", which was one of the band's favourite songs performed on tour but was not included in the album, and "Crests of Waves". The single's cover, created by Sølve Sundsbø, is a portrayal of Chris Martin. In the United States, while preparing "The Scientist" as the album's second release, the band's label felt the song failed to "provide enough of a blood rush for American listeners"; instead, they released "Clocks" as the second single in the US on 11 November 2002, the same day that "The Scientist" was issued in the UK.

== Music video ==
A music video was filmed in support of the song. It was directed by British filmmaker Dominic Leung, and shot at Docklands' ExCeL Building in London. It features the band performing the song, with a laser show, in front of a staged audience, mostly local college students. Stage effects and blue-red light transitions give the video a surreal feel, while a stoic crowd make up the audience. Martin has maketradefair.com scrawled on his left hand for the video to promote fair trade between countries and corporations, which can be seen at various moments throughout the video, especially when paused while he is playing piano at the 3-minute, 22-second mark. The website became defunct in 2004.

== Critical reception ==
=== Reviews ===
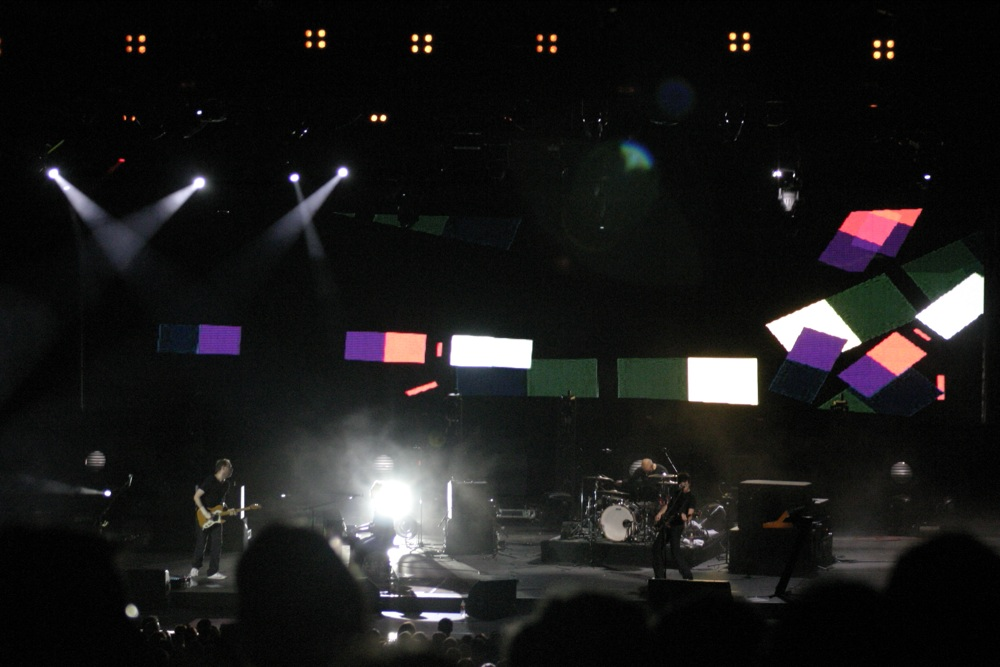
Coldplay performing "Clocks" on the Twisted Logic Tour

The song received widespread acclaim from music critics. Rob Sheffield from the Rolling Stone praised it as one of the album's highlights by saying that "[guitarist] Buckland shines in excellent psychedelic rockers such as 'Clocks'". David Cheal of The Daily Telegraph commented how the song features a "hypnotic piano riff, a pounding, almost frantic rhythm, and a contagious tune, all building to a gorgeously serene climax with Martin's floaty voice singing." Scott Floman from Goldmine described the track as "a stunningly pretty piano rocker, absolutely perfect and is simply one of the best songs of the decade". Bono of U2 named "Clocks" as one of 60 songs that saved his life.

The single was successful in radio throughout 2003, and appeared on several singles charts worldwide. It peaked at number nine in the United Kingdom, and rose to number 29 in the United States. The song also went number seven in Canada and number 28 in Australia. "Clocks" won a Grammy Award for Record of the Year at the 46th Annual Grammy Awards. Billboard ranked the song as the second-biggest hit in Adult Alternative Airplay history. In 2024, PPL placed it at number three among the band's most played tracks on British media.

"Clocks" has been regarded as one of Coldplay's finest achievements, with the track's piano progression being their signature creation. Many cuts from X&Y feature influences from "Clocks", with Brian Cohen of Billboard noting how it served as a "launching pad" for them in the band's third album: "several of which echo that song either in structure or feel". "Speed of Sound", the first single from X&Y, is similar to "Clocks".

In 2010, Rolling Stone placed "Clocks" at 490 on their 500 Greatest Songs of All Time list. In 2011, NME placed it amongst the "150 Best Tracks of the Past 15 Years". That same year, it ranked at number 155 on Pitchfork's "Greatest Songs of the 2000s" list. In 2021, Billboard featured "Clocks" in a list of the "100 Greatest Song Bridges of the 21st Century" as number 67. The same publication previously ranked "Clocks" first on their list of "50 Best Coldplay Songs".

=== Rankings ===
List of critic rankings
Publication	Year	Description	Result	Ref.
Billboard	2016	All Grammy Record of the Year Winners, Ranked	42	
Billboard	2021	The 100 Greatest Song Bridges of the 21st Century	67	
Billboard	2023	The 100 Greatest Songs of 2003	13	
Cleveland	2019	150 Greatest Songs of the 21st Century So Far	103	
KROQ-FM	2024	Top 500 Songs from the Last 30 Years	178	
Los Angeles Times	2025	Ranking the 66 Songs That Won Record of the Year	41	
MTV Australia	2013	The Official Top 1000 All Time Classics	Placed	
NME	2009	The Top 100 Tracks of the 2000s	43	
NME	2011	150 Best Tracks of the Past 15 Years	148	
NPO Radio 2	2007	Top 2000	6	
Pitchfork	2005	The Top 100 Singles of 2000–04	68	
Pitchfork	2009	The Top 500 Tracks of the 2000s	155	
Q	2003	1001 Best Songs Ever	Placed	
Radio X	2010	The Xfm Top 1000 Songs of All Time	Placed	
Radio X	2026	Best of British 500	234	
Rolling Stone	2010	The 500 Greatest Songs of All Time	490	
Rolling Stone	2011	100 Best Songs of the 2000s	26	
Slant	2010	The 100 Best Singles of the Aughts	93	
VH1	2011	100 Greatest Songs of the 2000s	17	
WYEP-FM	2020	Greatest Songs of the Past 30 Years	Placed	

== Remixes and samples ==
According to The New York Times, the opening piano arpeggios of the song have been widely sampled. The same publication said American singer Jordin Sparks and Chris Brown's 2008 single "No Air" "breathes life into the overfamiliar piano line" from "Clocks". The song "Should I Go" by American singer Brandy, from her album Afrodisiac, samples the piano riff of "Clocks", as does Mexican singer Alejandro Fernández's 2007 single "Te Voy A Perder" from his album Viento a Favor. In 2009, French DJ David Guetta in collaboration with Kelly Rowland released the song "When Love Takes Over", which has a piano introduction like that of "Clocks". A riff similar to "Clocks" was also used for the 2009 song "Shining Down" by Chicago hip hop artist Lupe Fiasco featuring Matthew Santos. An analogous riff can also be heard in the Cahill remix of the 2009 Agnes song "I Need You Now".

"Clocks" was remixed several times. Norwegian duo Röyksopp produced a version of the song which received a 1,000 limited edition 12" vinyl; 100 of which were made available through the band's official website. Their remix placed at number five in the Triple J Hottest 100, 2003 (the original placed at number 69 the previous year). In addition, there have been several other dance remixes of "Clocks", including those by Clokx and Deep Dish plus a mashup from Gabriel and Dresden's 2003 Essential Mix which appeared on various P2P networks. A remixed version of the song is included on the soundtrack of the 2007 video game Dance Dance Revolution Hottest Party for the Wii console.

== Track listings ==
7", 12", CD
No.	Title	Length
1.	"Clocks"	5:09
2.	"Crests of Waves"	3:39
3.	"Animals"	5:32

DVD
No.	Title	Length
1.	"Clocks" (video edit)	4:18
2.	"Politik" (live and photo gallery)
3.	"In My Place" (live)
4.	"Interview footage"

Japan Enhanced EP/Mexican Maxi-Single CD
No.	Title	Length
1.	"Clocks" (edit)	4:13
2.	"Crests of Waves"	3:39
3.	"Animals"	5:32
4.	"Murder"	5:37
5.	"In My Place" (live)	4:03
6.	"Yellow" (live)	5:13
7.	"Clocks" (video)	4:18
8.	"In My Place" (video)	3:48

=== Netherlands ===
A special three part single was released over six weeks in March and April featuring live tracks recorded at Rotterdam Ahoy in 2003.

CD1 (digipak) (released 24 March 2003)
No.	Title	Length
1.	"Clocks" (edit)	4:12
2.	"Politik" (live)	6:53
3.	"Shiver" (live)	5:26
4.	"Daylight" (live)	5:48

CD2 (released 7 April 2003)
No.	Title	Length
1.	"Clocks" (album version)	5:10
2.	"Trouble" (live)	5:43
3.	"The Scientist" (live)	5:18
4.	"Green Eyes/Mooie Ellebogen" (live)	5:16

CD3 (released 21 April 2003)
No.	Title	Length
1.	"Clocks" (live)	5:31
2.	"In My Place" (live)	3:51
3.	"Everything's Not Lost" (live)	8:47
4.	"Yellow" (live)	4:44

== Personnel ==
- Chris Martin – lead vocals, piano, synthesizer
- Jonny Buckland – electric guitar
- Guy Berryman – bass guitar
- Will Champion – drums, backing vocals

== Charts ==
=== Weekly charts ===
Weekly chart performance in the 2000s
Chart (2003)	Peak position
Australia (ARIA)	28
Belgium (Ultratip Bubbling Under Flanders)	2
Belgium (Ultratip Bubbling Under Wallonia)	7
Canada (Nielsen SoundScan)	7
Croatia (HRT)	5
El Salvador (El Siglo de Torreón)	5
Europe (European Hot 100 Singles)	28
France (SNEP)	65
Germany (GfK)	50
Hungary (Editors' Choice Top 40)	15
Ireland (IRMA)	15
Italy (FIMI)	24
Netherlands (Dutch Top 40)	2
Netherlands (Single Top 100)	2
New Zealand (Recorded Music NZ)	13
Scottish Singles Sales (Official Charts)	10
Switzerland (Schweizer Hitparade)	71
UK Singles (Official Charts)	9
US Billboard Hot 100	29
US Adult Alternative Airplay (Billboard)	1
US Adult Pop Airplay (Billboard)	4
US Alternative Airplay (Billboard)	9
US Dance Club Songs (Billboard)	31
US Pop Airplay (Billboard)	21

Weekly chart performance in the 2010s
Chart (2016–2017)	Peak position
South Korea International (Gaon)	92
US Hot Rock & Alternative Songs (Billboard)	16
UK Singles (Official Charts)	98

Weekly chart performance in the 2020s
Chart (2023–2024)	Peak position
Austria (Ö3 Austria Top 40)	45
Finland (Suomen virallinen lista)	41
Greece International (IFPI)	23
Netherlands (Single Top 100)	80
Portugal (AFP)	35
Singapore (RIAS)	20

=== Year-end charts ===
Year-end chart performance
Chart (2003)	Position
Brazil (Crowley)	42
Colombia (B & V Marketing)	5
Netherlands (Dutch Top 40)	14
Netherlands (Single Top 100)	30
New Zealand (RIANZ)	42
UK Singles (OCC)	150
US Billboard Hot 100	81
US Adult Top 40 (Billboard)	13
US Mainstream Top 40 (Billboard)	87
US Modern Rock Tracks (Billboard)	27
US Triple-A (Billboard)	1

== Certifications and sales ==
Certifications and sales
Region	Certification	Certified units/sales
Australia (ARIA)	4× Platinum	280,000^{‡}
Denmark (IFPI Danmark)	Platinum	90,000^{‡}
Italy (FIMI) Sales since 2009	Platinum	50,000^{‡}
Japan	—	1,152 (Note: Japanese physical sales for "Clocks" as of August 2003.)
New Zealand (RMNZ)	4× Platinum	120,000^{‡}
Portugal (AFP)	Platinum	40,000^{‡}
Spain (Promusicae)	Platinum	60,000^{‡}
United Kingdom (BPI)	3× Platinum	1,800,000^{‡}
United States (RIAA)	2× Platinum	2,000,000^{‡}
^{‡} Sales+streaming figures based on certification alone.

== Release history ==
Release dates and formats
Region	Date	Format	Label	Ref.
United States	11 November 2002	Triple A; alternative radio	Capitol	
United States	13 January 2003	Hot adult contemporary radio	Capitol	
United States	24 February 2003	Contemporary hit radio	Capitol	
Australia	17 March 2003	CD	Parlophone	
United Kingdom	24 March 2003	7-inch vinyl; CD; DVD	Parlophone	
Australia	21 April 2003	DVD	Parlophone	
Japan	24 July 2003	Mini-album	Parlophone	

== See also ==
- List of UK top-ten singles in 2003
- List of Billboard number-one adult alternative singles of the 2000s
