= WXYZ =

WXYZ may refer to:

- WXYZ-TV, an ABC-affiliated television station (channel 25, virtual 7) licensed to serve Detroit, Michigan, United States
- WXYT (AM), a radio station (1270 AM) licensed to serve Detroit, which held the call sign WXYZ from 1930 to 1984
- WRIF, a radio station (101.1 FM) licensed to serve Detroit, which held the call sign WXYZ-FM from 1948 to 1971
