= Transfer Walsh =

Bidding convention in contract bridge

Transfer Walsh is a bidding convention used in contract bridge. After a 1♣ opening bid, responses of 1♦ and 1♥ show heart and spade suits respectively. The "Walsh" terminology refers to the fact that these bids may conceal an equal or longer diamond suit. It allows opener to play a greater proportion of major-suit and no-trump contracts, particularly when using five-card majors.

== Using Transfer Walsh ==
Transfer Walsh is used responding to partner's 1♣ opening bid. The main responses are as follows:

- 1♦: Shows at least four hearts
- 1♥: Shows at least four spades
- 1♠: Shows at least four, alternatively five diamonds
- 1NT: Shows 6-9 HCP and a balanced hand without a four-card major

A variation is to have 1♠ show either diamonds or 6-9 HCP balanced, with the 1NT response showing 10-11 HCP balanced.

The term Transfer Walsh is commonly used, although responder's one level bids are not forcing a completed transfer from opener. In fact, over the 1♦ and 1♥ responses, opener will only accept the transfer holding minimum three-card support, otherwise bidding naturally. With four-card support, it is normal to accept the transfer at the 1-level holding a minimum hand and making a jump response (for example 2♥ after a 1♦ response) with a maximum (or higher with very strong hands). With three-card support the transfer is always completed at the 1-level, with less than three-card support another natural response is given. After 1♣-1♠, however, the transfer is only completed with four-card diamond support.

Further bidding is essentially natural.

The method is usually combined with the Walsh convention, where responder always shows a four-card major suit, even with a four- or five-card diamond holding, unless responder is strong enough for a reverse bid later in the auction (12 HCP or more).

A common variation is to have opener complete the transfer with 12-14 HCP balanced, even with only doubleton support for the major suit. Responder will pass with 5 cards if weak but rebid (perhaps 1NT) with only 4. This allows the 5-2 fit to be played in the better major contract. Opener will only break the transfer with a strong hand, such as 17+ if playing a 14-16 NT.

Another variation is to play that a response of 1♠ is a transfer to 1NT, and can be made with any strength. Not only does this right-side a NT contract, but it allows responder to rebid at the 2 level to show an invitational hand. 2♣ is Stayman to find a major fit, and 2 of any other suit shows 5 cards. This allows a game invitation to be declined and played in 2 of the major, a safer contract than the normal 3 level. Playing this way, if responder makes the initial transfer to the major and rebids it, it shows a 6 card suit. This enables the major length to be shown exactly, whether 4, 5 or 6, as well as showing the strength as weak, invitational, or game forcing.

The now free 1NT response can then be used to show a weak hand with both 4 card majors, or alternatively to show diamonds.

== Examples of use ==
If the auction goes 1♣-1♥; 1NT, opener has denied three-card spade support, and responder needs not worry about missing a 5-3 fit in spades.

If the auction goes 1♣-1♦;1♥-1♠;2♠, opener has given a relatively precise picture of his hand: By accepting the transfer bidding 1♥, he has shown three-card (rarely four-card) heart support, by bidding 2♠ four-card spade support (and a minimum opening), and by opening 1♣ (in a natural system) at least three clubs.

== Advantages of using Transfer Walsh ==
Transfer Walsh in a very early stage of bidding determines the possibility of a fit, giving good control of further game and slam bidding.

Likewise, one has the chance of stopping at an early stage, especially using the XY Notrump Convention.

It becomes significantly easier to find 3-5 major suit fits (and in some variants 2-5 fits).

Opener (usually the stronger hand) becomes declarer in most major suit and NT contracts.

== See also ==
- Walsh convention
- XY Notrump convention
