= Music Industry Association of Korea =

1964–2008 South Korean organization

- Abbreviation: MIAK
- Formation: April 3, 1964
- Defunct: 2008; 18 years ago
- Type: Non-profit
- Headquarters: Seoul, South Korea
- Formerly called: Korea Record Producers Association; Korea Record Association; Korea Video and Record Association; Record Industry Association of Korea

Korean name
- Hangul: 한국음악산업협회
- RR: Hanguk eumak saneop hyeophoe
- MR: Han'guk ŭmak sanŏp hyŏphoe

The Music Industry Association of Korea (MIAK; Korean: 한국음악산업협회) was a South Korean music organisation that protected the rights of music labels and distributors. Originally founded in 1964 as the Korea Record Producers Association, its membership eventually grew to consist of over 140 companies. The MIAK carried out various activities to support the growth of the South Korean music industry and is also known for operating a monthly record sales chart. The organisation has been defunct since 2008.

== History ==
The South Korean music industry experienced accelerated growth following the country's liberation from Japanese rule in 1945, as South Korean companies began to release records independently for the first time. As a result, the Korea Record Producers Association was established on April 3, 1964, the first organisation in South Korea to be formed by a consortium of record labels and distributors. It was renamed the Korea Record Association in 1967 and received authorisation from the Ministry of Culture and Information in 1972. A video division was created in 1982. The organisation underwent several further name changes; it became the Korea Video and Record Association in 1995, then the Record Industry Association of Korea (RIAK) in 2000 after separating from the video division. In May 2004, it changed its name again to the Music Industry Association of Korea in order to reflect changing patterns in music consumption, as consumers turned increasingly to digital downloads over physical media. The organisation eventually closed its offices in 2008 and stopped carrying out its functions.

== Functions ==
The purpose of the MIAK was to protect the interests of record labels and distributors, as well as to support the development of the South Korean music industry. It worked on projects to modernise industry facilities, improve record distribution structure, promote international exchange with foreign music industries, and take measures against piracy. It also co-hosted the Golden Disc Awards.

=== Record chart ===
Between 1998 and 2008, the MIAK operated a music chart, publishing monthly sales figures for records released in South Korea. The data was not independently verified, but based on sales figures reported by member companies, which consisted of over 140 agencies and distributors. The chart faced questions over its credibility, with allegations that some record companies colluded with distributors to inflate numbers by mass-buying albums. It was also limited by the voluntary reporting system; the sales ranking for the first half of 2006 excluded certain albums because the distributor failed to submit the data. However, South Korea lacked an official music chart at the time, and the MIAK chart was considered more reliable than the rival Hanteo Chart, which estimated sales based on data taken from a small percentage of retailers. It stopped publishing sales rankings in September 2008.
