= The Xfm Top 1000 Songs of All Time =

- Author: Mike Walsh
- Cover artist: Uncredited
- Language: English
- Genre: Reference work
- Publisher: Elliott & Thompson Limited
- Publication date: 2010
- Publication place: United Kingdom
- Media type: Print (Hardback)
- Pages: 480 p.
- ISBN: 978-1904027966

The Xfm Top 1000 Songs of All Time is a music reference book edited by various DJs of the now defunct radio station Xfm, which was published by Elliott & Thompson Limited in 2010. The only edition comprises a list of singles and popular album tracks released between 1965 and 2009. The book is arranged alphabetically rather than in the form of a chart, while Brandon Flowers of The Killers provides a foreword.

The list was determined by listener votes of the radio station voting on their website, opinions from DJs and radio play requests on the station's flagship show The X-List. The station formerly broadcast to London and Manchester on digital DAB radio, and online to the rest of the world, with nearly 1 million listeners. The station also had a close relationship with Australian station Triple J. Each entry in the list is accompanied by a short essay written by a DJ. The entries are accompanied by pictures, quotes, and additional information. As mentioned before, the list not only included singles, but also album-only tracks that entered public knowledge, with Led Zeppelin's "Stairway to Heaven" and Pink Floyd's "Comfortably Numb" being examples.

The book mostly keeps to alternative rock acts, as well as classic bands such as the Beatles. The most recent singles in the book take up most of the list and many artists who appear expressed their achievement as a highlight of their career, with a small number writing on the Xfm official site and also in the book itself.

== See also ==
- 1001 Albums You Must Hear Before You Die
- 1,000 Recordings to Hear Before You Die
- The Pitchfork 500
