= Walsh convention =

Bidding convention in contract bridge

See the Glossary of contract bridge terms for an explanation of unfamiliar words or phrases.

Walsh is a convention used in the card game of bridge in response to an opening bid of 1♣. The convention has its origins in the Walsh System developed by Richard and Rhoda Walsh.

In general, the Walsh convention is not used in four-card major systems such as Acol, but may be employed in some five-card major systems; especially those that use a prepared club, rather than better minor. The opening bid of 1♣ will therefore have shown either clubs or a balanced hand.

When responder is too weak to force to game diamond suits are bypassed in favour of major suits, regardless of the length of the diamond suit. For example, holding ♠ AJ72 ♥ J74 ♦ K10653 ♣ 8, the response to the opening bid of 1♣ would be 1♠ rather than the normal 1♦.

Continuations vary according to other details of the system being played. If Checkback Stayman is being played, then the auction 1♣ – 1♠; 1NT – 2♦ would show this hand and end the auction. If New minor forcing is being used, then 3♦ is used as the sign off bid instead.

When the values to force to game are held, the procedure is abandoned, and suits are bid in the normal order. Responders reverse from diamonds into a major thus becomes game forcing. So, holding ♠ AJ72 ♥ AK4 ♦ K10653 ♣ 8, the auction starts 1♣ – 1♦; 1NT – 2♠.

The main purpose of the convention is to avoid missing major suit fits when opener has something akin to a weak notrump, and would rebid 1NT over the normal 1♦ response. The major suit fit is likely to provide a safer resting place when the hands are weak, as well as potentially scoring better (a concern perhaps only at matchpoints).

It is a form of Canapé and thus the responses of 1♥ and 1♠ to a 1♣ opener are alertable in the UK under EBU regulations.
