= Jake Kasdan =

American filmmaker (born 1974)

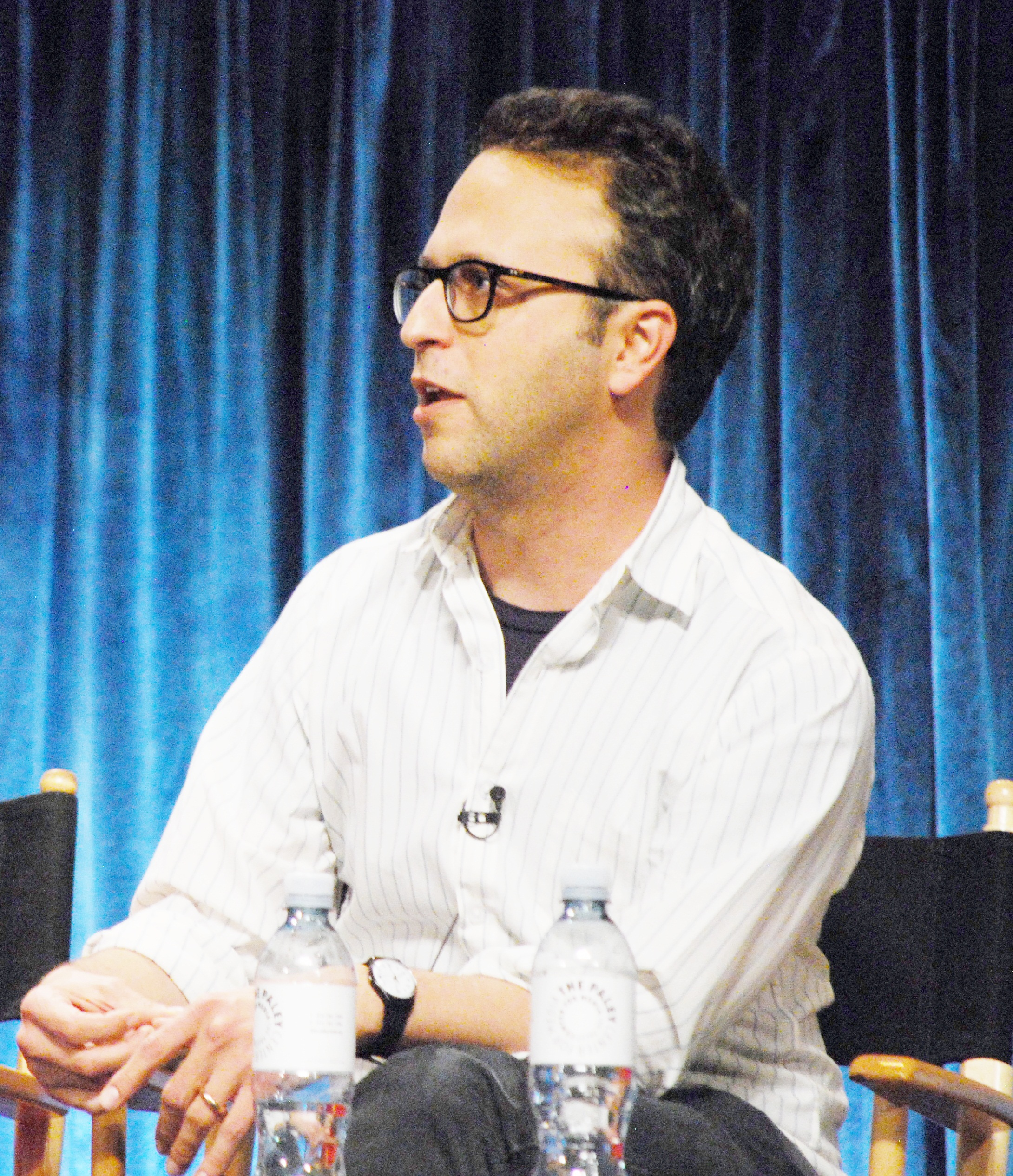
- Kasdan in March 2012
- Born: Jacob Kasdan; October 28, 1974 (age 52); Detroit, Michigan, U.S.
- Occupations: Director; producer; screenwriter; actor
- Years active: 1983–present
- Spouse: Inara George
- Children: 3
- Father: Lawrence Kasdan
- Relatives: Jonathan Kasdan (brother); Mark Kasdan (uncle)

Jacob Kasdan (born October 28, 1974) is an American filmmaker and actor. He is best known for directing the films Walk Hard: The Dewey Cox Story (2007), Bad Teacher (2011), Sex Tape (2014), the Jumanji films (2017–2026), and Red One (2024).

== Early life ==
Jacob Kasdan was born to Meg (née Goldman), a writer, and Lawrence Kasdan, a writer and director, in Detroit. Jacob grew up in a Jewish family with little religious education. His younger brother, Jonathan Kasdan, also works in the film and television industry as an actor and writer.

== Career ==
Jake Kasdan has directed nine films. He has also worked in television, most notably with Judd Apatow as a consulting producer and director on Freaks and Geeks and as a director on Undeclared. He has directed numerous stage productions.

In 2008, Kasdan received his first Golden Globe nomination for Walk Hard in the Best Original Song category (shared with John C. Reilly, Apatow, and Marshall Crenshaw), but lost to "Guaranteed" from Into the Wild (written by Eddie Vedder). As a child, Kasdan made appearances in his father's movies such as The Big Chill and Silverado (in the former he is an autograph seeker at a funeral and in the latter a stable boy).

After the success of New Girl, Kasdan announced that on July 11, 2012, he had signed a deal with 20th Century Fox Television, through The Detective Agency to pursue his own projects. In February 2015, Fox announced that it had greenlit a pilot for the comedy The Grinder to be directed by Kasdan and starring Rob Lowe. On March 26, 2019, The Detective Agency's producing partners Kasdan and Melvin Mar reupped, and signed a new overall deal at 20th Century Fox Television.

In October 2021, it was announced that Disney+ had given a series order to a television adaptation of the graphic novel American Born Chinese. It will be produced by 20th Century Fox Television with Kelvin Yu and Charles Yu as writers and executive producers, Marvin Mar and Kasdan as executive producers, and Destin Daniel Cretton as director and executive producer. Most recently, he served as executive producer of the workplace comedy pilot XYZ at ABC.

In late 2024, it was announced that Jake Kasdan, Patty Jenkins and Joe Cornish would each direct a live-action film for the Lego Group and Universal Pictures. The script for Kasdan's film script was written by Andrew Mogel and Jarrad Paul, based on a story and previous draft by Matt Mider and Kevin Burrows, and Kasdan will also produce the film through Detective Agency.

== Personal life ==
Kasdan is married to singer-songwriter Inara George of the duo The Bird and the Bee. They have three children including twins Beau and Lorelei Kasdan and older son Otis Kasdan.

== Filmography ==
Key
†	Denotes films that have not yet been released

=== Film ===
Year	Title	Director	Producer	Writer
1998	Zero Effect	Yes	Yes	Yes
2002	Orange County	Yes	No	No
2006	The TV Set	Yes	Yes	Yes
2007	Walk Hard: The Dewey Cox Story	Yes	Yes	Yes
2008	Shades of Ray	No	Executive	No
2011	Bad Teacher	Yes	Executive	No
2011	Friends with Kids	No	Executive	No
2014	Sex Tape	Yes	Executive	No
2017	Jumanji: Welcome to the Jungle	Yes	Executive	No
2019	Jumanji: The Next Level	Yes	Yes	Yes
2024	Red One	Yes	Yes	No
2026	Jumanji: Open World †	Yes	Yes	Yes

Acting credits

Year	Title	Role
1983	The Big Chill	Autograph Seeker
1985	Silverado	Stable Boy
1988	The Accidental Tourist	Scott Canfield
1998	Zero Effect	Bank Teller (voice)
2008	Shades of Ray	Director # 3

Soundtrack credits

Year	Title	Song
1998	Zero Effect	Let's Run Off and Get Married
1998	Zero Effect	Cold and Dark in My Heart
2007	Walk Hard: The Dewey Cox Story	Walk Hard
2007	Walk Hard: The Dewey Cox Story	Take My Hand
2007	Walk Hard: The Dewey Cox Story	(Mama) You Got To Love Your Negro Man
2007	Walk Hard: The Dewey Cox Story	Cut My Brother in Half Blues
2007	Walk Hard: The Dewey Cox Story	There's a Change a'Happening (I Can Feel It)
2007	Walk Hard: The Dewey Cox Story	(You Make Me So) Hard

Music video

- "Believe" by Shawn Mendes (2015)

Other credits

Year	Title	Role
1991	Grand Canyon	Production assistant
1994	Wyatt Earp	Archivist

=== Television ===
Year(s)	Title	Director	Executive Producer	Writer	Notes
1999–00	Freaks and Geeks	Yes	No	No	Director (5 episodes) / Also consulting producer (15 episodes)
2000	Grosse Pointe	Yes	No	No	2 episodes
2001	Undeclared	Yes	No	No	Episode "Prototype"
2002	Zero Effect	Yes	Co-Executive	Yes	Unsold pilot
2006	Cracking Up	Yes	No	No	Episode "The Fixer"
2008	Californication	Yes	No	No	Episode "In a Lonely Place"
2011–18	New Girl	Yes	Yes	No	Director (7 episodes) / Executive producer (146 episodes)
2012–13	Ben and Kate	Yes	Yes	No	Director (2 episodes) / Executive producer (16 episodes)
2015	Weird Loners	Yes	Yes	No	Director (2 episodes) / Executive producer (6 episodes)
2015–16	The Grinder	Yes	Yes	No	Director (2 episodes) / Executive producer (22 episodes)
2015–20	Fresh Off the Boat	Yes	Yes	No	Director (Episode "The Shunning") / Executive producer (116 episodes)
2016–19	Speechless	No	Yes	No	63 episodes
2019–20	Bless This Mess	No	Yes	No	26 episodes
2021–2023	Doogie Kamealoha, M.D	Yes	Yes	No	Director (Episode "Aloha – The Hello One") / Executive producer (10 episodes)
2023	American Born Chinese	No	Yes	No	8 episodes

TV movies

Year	Title	Director	Executive Producer
2011	Spring/Fall	Yes	No
2017	Jalen Vs. Everybody	No	Yes
2019	Heart of Life	No	Yes
2023	Prom Pact	No	Yes

Acting credits

Year	Title	Role	Notes
2021	Young Rock	Tyler the Director	Episode "A Christmas Peril"

== Awards ==
Year	Award	Category	Film	Result	Notes
2007	Sierra Award	Best Song	Walk Hard: The Dewey Cox Story	Won	shared with Judd Apatow, Marshall Crenshaw and John C. Reilly for "Walk Hard"
2008	Golden Globe	Best Original Song	Walk Hard: The Dewey Cox Story	Nominated	shared with Judd Apatow, Marshall Crenshaw and John C. Reilly for "Walk Hard"
2009	Grammy	Best Song Written for Visual Media	Walk Hard: The Dewey Cox Story	Nominated	shared with Judd Apatow, Marshall Crenshaw and John C. Reilly for "Walk Hard"
2012	Primetime Emmy Award	Outstanding Directing for a Comedy Series	New Girl	Nominated	for "Pilot"
