= Carol Littleton =

American film editor

Carol Littleton ACE
- Born: October 23, 1942 (age 84); Oklahoma City, U.S.
- Education: University of Oklahoma, College of Arts & Sciences Associate of Arts, Cottey College, Nevada, MO
- Occupation: Film editor
- Years active: 1970–present
- Spouse: John Bailey (m. 1972; died 2023)
- Awards: Emmy Award; Eddie Award

President of the Motion Picture Editors Guild (MPEG)
- In office 1988–1991
- Preceded by: Bea Dennis
- Succeeded by: Donn Cambern

Vice President of the Motion Picture Editors Guild (MPEG)
- In office 1994–2001
- In office 2005–2007

Vice President of American Cinema Editors (ACE)
- In office 2019–present

Board of Governors, Academy of Motion Picture Arts and Sciences (AMPAS)
- In office 1990 – 2002 (reelected twice)
- In office 2015 – present (reelected once)

Carol Sue Littleton, ACE (born October 23, 1942) is an American film editor. Her work includes Body Heat (1981), E.T. the Extra-Terrestrial (1982), The Big Chill (1983), Places in the Heart (1984), Silverado (1985), The Accidental Tourist (1988), and Wyatt Earp (1994). She won the Primetime Emmy Award for the ABC movie Tuesdays with Morrie (1999). In January 2024, she received an Honorary Oscar for her work.

== Early life and education ==
Carol Littleton was born 1942 in Oklahoma City but her family later moved to Miami in Northeastern Oklahoma, where she grew up. She attended the University of Oklahoma College of Arts & Sciences, obtaining her bachelor's degree in 1965 and her master's in 1970.

== Career ==
Her obsession with film editing started in France, when Littleton became acquainted with French New Wave cinema. During the 1970s, Carol Littleton owned a production company that made commercials. She moved into working as a film editor with director Karen Arthur on Legacy (1975). Other films were to follow and Littleton received an Academy Award nomination for editing Steven Spielberg's E.T. the Extra-Terrestrial (1982). Commencing with Body Heat (1981), Littleton had an extended collaboration with the director Lawrence Kasdan. Kasdan hired Littleton for Body Heat not only for her skill, but specifically because she was a woman. He believed only a woman editor could bring the eroticism he wanted to the film. Of the 11 films that Kasdan has directed, Littleton edited nine.

In the late 1980s, Carol Littleton was elected to and served as the president of the Motion Picture Editors Guild. Littleton served as president of the Motion Picture Editors Guild from 1988 to 1991, and as vice president from 1994 to 2001, as well as from 2005 to 2007. Littleton has been elected as a member of the American Cinema Editors, and has served as ACE vice president since 2019. She is also a current member of the board of governors of the Academy of Motion Picture Arts and Sciences (Film Editors Branch). Littleton is one of the editors that author Gabriella Oldham interviewed for her book First Cut: Conversations with Film Editors (1992).

== Personal life ==
Carol Littleton was married to cinematographer John Bailey from 1972 until his death in 2023.

== Filmography ==
=== Film ===
Year	Title	Director	Notes
1975	Legacy	Karen Arthur	
1977	The Hazing	Douglas Curtis	Alternative title: The Curious Case of the Campus Corpse
1978	The Mafu Cage	Karen Arthur	Alternative title: Don't Ring the Doorbell
1979	French Postcards	Willard Huyck	
1980	Roadie	Alan Rudolph	As supervising editor Tom Walls was the main editor
1981	Body Heat	Lawrence Kasdan	
1982	E.T. the Extra-Terrestrial	Steven Spielberg	
1983	The Big Chill	Lawrence Kasdan	
1984	Places in the Heart	Robert Benton	
1985	Silverado	Lawrence Kasdan	
1986	Brighton Beach Memoirs	Gene Saks	
1987	Swimming to Cambodia	Jonathan Demme	
1988	Vibes	Ken Kwapis	
1988	The Accidental Tourist	Lawrence Kasdan	
1990	White Palace	Luis Mandoki	
1991	Grand Canyon	Lawrence Kasdan	
1993	Benny & Joon	Jeremiah S. Chechik	
1994	China Moon	John Bailey	Co-edited with Jill Savitt
1994	Wyatt Earp	Lawrence Kasdan	
1996	Diabolique	Jeremiah S. Chechik	
1998	Twilight	Robert Benton	
1998	Beloved	Jonathan Demme	Co-edited with Andy Keir
1999	Mumford	Lawrence Kasdan	Co-edited with William Steinkamp
2000	What Women Want	Nancy Meyers	As additional editor Thomas J. Nordberg & Stephen A. Rotter were the main editors
2001	The Anniversary Party	Jennifer Jason Leigh; Alan Cumming	Co-edited with Suzanne Spangler
2002	The Truth About Charlie	Jonathan Demme	Co-edited with Suzanne Spangler
2003	Dreamcatcher	Lawrence Kasdan	Co-edited with Raúl Dávalos
2004	The Manchurian Candidate	Jonathan Demme	Co-edited with Craig McKay
2007	In the Land of Women	Jon Kasdan	Co-edited with Marty Levenstein
2007	Margot at the Wedding	Noah Baumbach	
2008	The Other Boleyn Girl	Justin Chadwick	Co-edited with Paul Knight
2010	Country Strong	Shana Feste	Co-edited with Conor O’Neill
2011	The Rum Diary	Bruce Robinson	
2012	Darling Companion	Lawrence Kasdan	
2015	A Walk in the Woods	Ken Kwapis	Co-edited with Julie Garcés

=== Television ===
Year	Title	Director	Notes
1978	Battered	Peter Werner	TV movie
1999	Tuesdays with Morrie	Mick Jackson	ABC television movie
2016	All the Way	Jay Roach	HBO television movie
2018	My Dinner with Hervé	Sacha Gervasi	HBO television film

== Accolades ==
Year	Association	Award	Project	Result	Ref.
1983	Academy Award	Best Film Editing	E.T. the Extra-Terrestrial	Nominated	
1983	BAFTA Film Award	Best Editing	E.T. the Extra-Terrestrial	Nominated	
1983	American Cinema Editors	Best Edited Feature Film	E.T. the Extra-Terrestrial	Nominated	
2000	Primetime Emmy Award	Outstanding Single Camera Picture Editing for a Miniseries, Movie or a Special	Tuesdays with Morrie	Won	
2016	American Cinema Editors	Career Achievement Award		Received	
2017	American Cinema Editors	Best Edited Miniseries or Television Movie	All the Way	Won	
2023	Academy Award	Honorary Academy Award		Received	

== See also ==
- List of film director and editor collaborations
