= Jonathan Kasdan =

American writer, director and actor

- Born: Jonathan Peter Kasdan; September 30, 1979 (age 46); Los Angeles, California, U.S.
- Occupations: Screenwriter; director; actor
- Years active: 1983–present
- Father: Lawrence Kasdan
- Relatives: Jake Kasdan (brother); Mark Kasdan (uncle)

Jonathan Peter Kasdan (born September 30, 1979) is an American film and television screenwriter, director, producer, and actor.

== Early life and career ==
Jonathan Kasdan was born to Meg (née Goldman), a writer and Lawrence Kasdan, a writer and director in Los Angeles. Jon grew up in a Jewish family with little religious education. Jon is the younger brother of director and actor Jake Kasdan. Jon's directorial debut, In the Land of Women, was released in the United States in 2007. He also wrote the screenplay for the film, which premiered at the Cannes Film Festival in 2006.

Jon Kasdan has worked as a writer for the American television series Freaks and Geeks, and as an actor in Dawson's Creek and Dreamcatcher. His acting debut was in 1983 in his father's film, The Big Chill. Jon was diagnosed with Hodgkin's disease when he was a 17-year-old junior in high school.

== Filmography ==
=== Television ===
Year(s)	Title	Director	Writer	Executive Producer	Notes
2000	Freaks and Geeks	No	Yes	No	Episode "The Little Things"
2000–2002	Dawson's Creek	No	Yes	No	5 episodes
2016	Roadies	Yes	No	No	2 episodes
2022–2023	Willow	No	Yes	Yes	Also developer; Wrote 3 episodes
2023	Willow: Behind the Magic	No	No	Yes	Documentary special

Acting roles

Year	Title	Role	Notes
1999	Freaks and Geeks	Tommy	Episode "Tricks and Treats"
2002	Dawson's Creek	Gawky-Looking Kid	Episode "Cigarette Burns"
2011–2014	Californication	Director	9 episodes

=== Film ===
Year	Title	Director	Writer	Co-Producer	Ref.
2007	In the Land of Women	Yes	Yes	No	
2012	The First Time	Yes	Yes	No	
2018	Solo: A Star Wars Story	No	Yes	Yes	

Acting roles

Year	Title	Role	Notes
1983	The Big Chill	Harold and Sarah's son	
1985	Silverado	Boy at Outpost	
1988	The Accidental Tourist	Boy at Doctor's Office	
1990	I Love You to Death	Dominic	
1994	Wyatt Earp	Bar Boy	
2002	Slackers	Barry	
2002	Big Trouble	Jack Pendick Trainee	
2003	Dreamcatcher	Defuniak	
2012	Darling Companion	Offciant	
2018	Solo: A Star Wars Story	Bink Otauna	Deleted scene
