= Dreamcatcher (2003 film) =

2003 film by Lawrence Kasdan

- Theatrical release poster
- Directed by: Lawrence Kasdan
- Screenplay by: William Goldman; Lawrence Kasdan
- Based on: Dreamcatcher by Stephen King
- Produced by: Lawrence Kasdan; Charles Okun; Mark Kasdan
- Starring: Morgan Freeman; Thomas Jane; Jason Lee; Damian Lewis; Timothy Olyphant; Tom Sizemore; Donnie Wahlberg
- Cinematography: John Seale
- Edited by: Carol Littleton; Raul Davalos
- Music by: James Newton Howard
- Production companies: Castle Rock Entertainment; Village Roadshow Pictures; Kasdan Pictures; NPV Entertainment; WV Films II
- Distributed by: Warner Bros. Pictures
- Release date: March 21, 2003
- Running time: 134 minutes
- Country: United States
- Language: English
- Budget: $68 million
- Box office: $75.7 million

Dreamcatcher is a 2003 American science fiction horror film based on Stephen King's 2001 novel of the same name. Directed by Lawrence Kasdan and co-written by Kasdan and screenwriter William Goldman, the film stars Thomas Jane, Jason Lee, Damian Lewis, Timothy Olyphant, Morgan Freeman, Tom Sizemore, and Donnie Wahlberg. The film tells about four gifted friends who encounter an invasion of parasitic aliens while trying to find their long lost friend and evade a military organization that are hunting both them and alien activities.

Dreamcatcher was released on March 21, 2003 by Warner Bros. Pictures. The film received negative reviews and grossed $75.7 million against a $68 million budget.

== Plot ==
Jonesy, Beaver, Pete, and Henry are four friends on an annual hunting trip in Maine. As children, they all acquired telepathic powers which they call "the line" after saving a boy with disabilities named Douglas "Duddits" Cavell from bullies and befriending him.

One night, Jonesy sees Duddits beckoning him to cross the street, but as he does so, he is hit by a car. His injuries heal with mysterious speed, and six months later, he is able to make it for the group's annual trip. Jonesy rescues a man lost in the forest named Rick McCarthy. He is very ill, so Jonesy and Beaver let him rest and recover inside their cabin. Suddenly, all the forest animals—predator and prey both—run past their cabin in the same direction, followed by two military helicopters that announce the area is now quarantined. Jonesy and Beaver return to the cabin to find a trail of blood from the bedroom to the bathroom, where Rick sits dead, covered in blood. A three-foot long worm-like creature writhes and screams in the toilet. Beaver sits atop the toilet lid to trap the creature, but the creature breaks out as a result of his insistence on picking up a far-away toothpick and kills him. Jonesy tries to escape, but is confronted by a large alien called Mr. Gray, who possesses Jonesy's body.

Nearby, Henry and Pete crash their SUV to avoid running over a frostbitten woman from Rick's original hunting party. Henry walks for help while Pete stays with the woman. She dies and also excretes a worm, which Pete barely manages to kill. Mr. Gray tricks and kidnaps Pete, but Jonesy telepathically warns Henry to stay hidden. Henry returns to the cabin to find Beaver dead and the worm that killed him laying a group of eggs. To kill all of the alien larvae, he sets fire to the cabin.

Meanwhile, an elite military unit specializing in extraterrestrials, led by the unhinged Colonel Abraham Curtis, seeks to contain everyone exposed to an alien virus known as "Ripley". Col. Curtis is planning to retire after this operation and will pass command, along with a pearl-handled stainless-steel .45 pistol, to Captain Owen Underhill, his trusted friend and second-in-command. The two lead an air-strike into a large forest clearing where the aliens' spaceship has crash-landed. The aliens use telepathy to ask for mercy, but the helicopters massacre most of the aliens with mini-guns and missiles. The alien ship self-destructs, destroying the remaining aliens and two helicopters.

Jonesy retraces his memories of the area while watching Mr. Gray use his body. Mr. Gray tries to coerce Pete into cooperating but eats him when he refuses. Jonesy realizes that Mr. Gray possessed him, not by chance, but to access memories of Duddits, which he needs. Henry arrives at the fenced-in quarantine camp only to realize that Col. Curtis plans to kill all of those quarantined in order to prevent further infection. Henry convinces Underhill to prevent this by going over Curtis' head and having him relieved.

Henry and Underhill break out of the camp and head to Duddits' home. Duddits, who is dying of leukemia, informs them Mr. Gray is headed for the Quabbin Reservoir to seed the water with alien larvae and infect the world's population. Curtis, now bent on revenge on Underhill for his deception, leaves the camp in his armed helicopter and tracks down Henry, Underhill, and Duddits, attacking them at the reservoir. Underhill is mortally wounded and dies shortly after he shoots Curtis down.

In the reservoir's pump house, Henry manages to stop Mr. Gray's plan, but struggles to bring himself to kill Jonesy, unable to tell who is in control. Unknown to him, an alien larva hatches and begins crawling toward the water. Duddits confronts Mr. Gray, who finally exits Jonesy's body. The two struggle as Duddits changes form into a non-human creature. Both then explode in a cloud of red-dust, which briefly resembles a dreamcatcher. Jonesy, now himself again, steps on the final alien larva before it can contaminate the reservoir.

== Cast ==
- Thomas Jane as Dr. Henry Devlin
  - Mikey Holekamp as Young Henry Devlin
- Damian Lewis as Gary "Jonesy" Jones / Mr. Gray
  - Giacomo Baessato as Young Gary "Jonesy" Jones
- Timothy Olyphant as Pete Moore
  - Joel Palmer as Young Pete Moore
- Jason Lee as Joe "Beaver" Clarendon
  - Reece Thompson as Young Joe "Beaver" Clarendon
- Donnie Wahlberg as Douglas "Duddits" Cavell
  - Andrew Robb / Tyler Myer as Young Douglas "Duddits" Cavell
- Morgan Freeman as Colonel Abraham Curtis
- Tom Sizemore as Lieutenant Owen Underhill
- Eric Keenleyside as Rick McCarthy
- Rosemary Dunsmore as Roberta Cavell
- Michael O'Neill as Lieutenant General Matheson
- Darrin Klimek as Maples
- Campbell Lane as Old Man Gosselin
- C. Ernst Harth as Barry Neiman
- Ingrid Kavelaars as Trish
- Alex Campbell as Richie Grenadeau

== Production ==
Dreamcatcher was filmed around Prince George, British Columbia for seven weeks, starting in January 2002. Further shooting was done in Vancouver for ten weeks.

== Reception ==
=== Box office ===
With a box-office gross of $33,685,268 in the North American domestic market, Dreamcatcher earned only half of its estimated $68 million production budget, barely surpassing it worldwide with $75,715,436. The film is considered a flop.

In a 2012 interview, during a promotional tour for his film Darling Companion, Kasdan admitted that the commercial failure of Dreamcatcher left him "Wounded careerwise...But not so much personally. I've been personally wounded by other movies, where I'd written it, and thought, 'Oh, God, the world's not interested in what I'm interested in.' With Dreamcatcher, the career was hurt. I was planning to do The Risk Pool with Tom Hanks. I had written the script from a great book by Richard Russo (Nobody's Fool). And it didn't happen. Then another one didn't happen. Meanwhile, two years have passed here, two have passed there. That's how you're wounded."

=== Critical response ===
Dreamcatcher received negative reviews from critics, earning a 28% rating on review aggregation website Rotten Tomatoes based on 180 reviews, and an average rating of 4.73/10. The site's consensus states: "An incoherent and overly long creature feature." On Metacritic, the film has a weighted average score of 35 out of 100 based on 38 critics, indicating "generally unfavorable" reviews. Audiences polled by CinemaScore gave the film an average grade of "C+" on an A+ to F scale.

Mick LaSalle's review for the San Francisco Chronicle summed up the film as "a likeable disaster." Richard Roeper commented that "not since Death to Smoochy have so many talented people made such a mess of things."

Roger Ebert gave the film 1.5 stars out of a possible 4, writing: "Dreamcatcher begins as the intriguing story of friends who share a telepathic gift, and ends as a monster movie of stunning awfulness. What went wrong?" Ebert thought Jonesy's Memory Warehouse was a highlight, and intriguing enough to be the focus of a film, though Dreamcatcher neglects the concept to instead emphasize gore.

=== King's reaction ===
At the time of its release, Stephen King praised the film, stating: "This is one of the very, very good adaptations of my work." He further said the film “would do for the toilet what Psycho did for the shower.”
