= Lawrence Kasdan =

American filmmaker (born 1949)

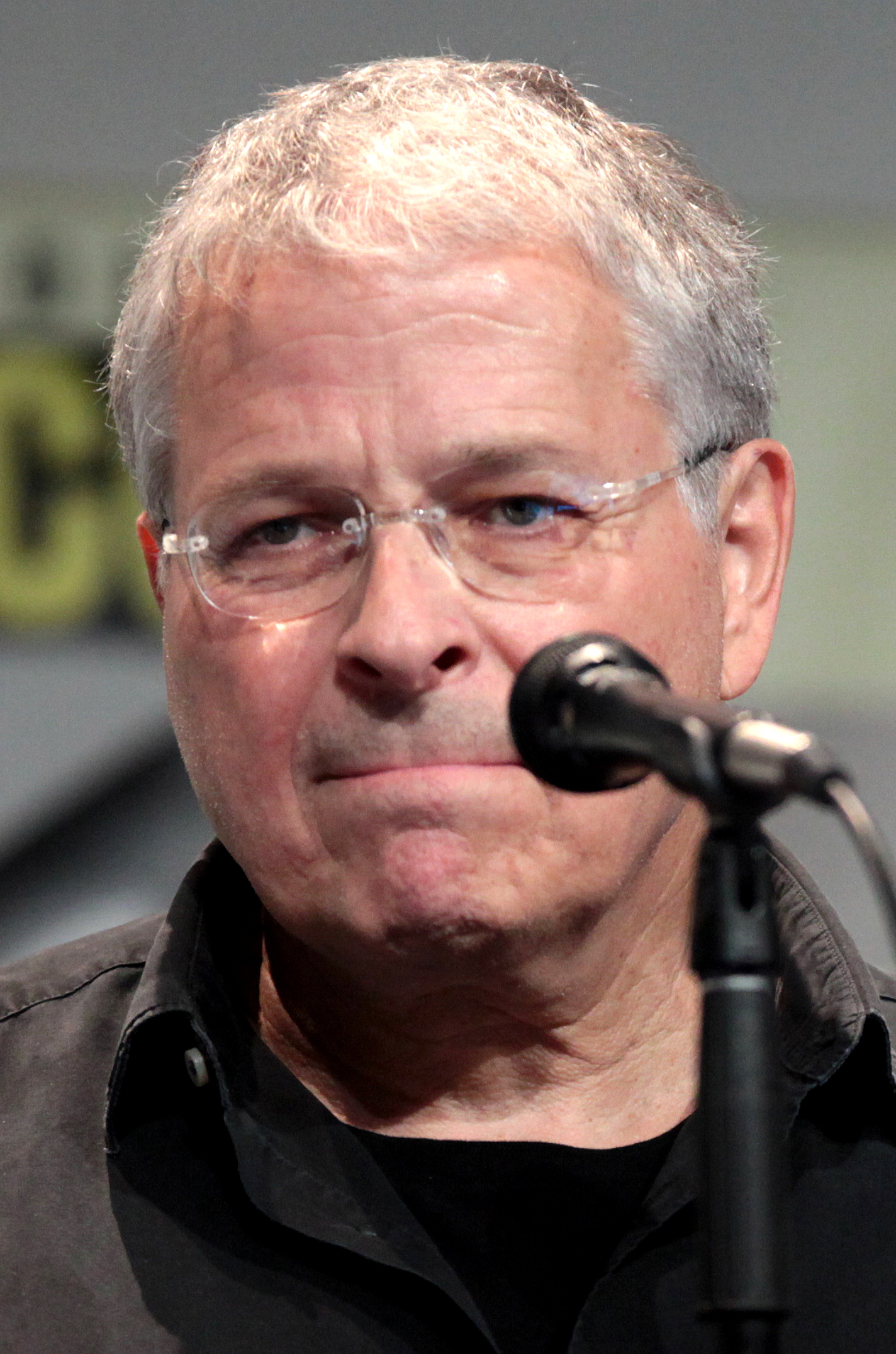
- Kasdan at the 2015 San Diego Comic-Con
- Born: Lawrence Edward Kasdan; January 14, 1949 (age 77); Miami Beach, Florida, U.S.
- Education: University of Michigan
- Occupations: Screenwriter; film director; film producer
- Years active: 1980–present
- Spouse: Meg Goldman (m. 1971)
- Children: Jake; Jonathan
- Relatives: Mark Kasdan (brother)

Lawrence Edward Kasdan (born January 14, 1949) is an American filmmaker. He wrote and directed Body Heat (1981), The Big Chill (1983), Silverado (1985), The Accidental Tourist (1988), and Dreamcatcher (2003). Kasdan also wrote Raiders of the Lost Ark (1981) and The Bodyguard (1992) and co-wrote four Star Wars films: The Empire Strikes Back (1980), Return of the Jedi (1983), The Force Awakens (2015), and Solo: A Star Wars Story (2018).

Kasdan is known for updating old Hollywood genres—film noir, science fiction, the western—in a classical dramatic style with quick-witted dialogue, but dealing with contemporary social themes. He is also known for his frequent collaborations, including directing William Hurt and Kevin Kline and writing dialogue for Harrison Ford.

Kasdan has been nominated for four Academy Awards: as a producer for Best Picture nominee The Accidental Tourist, for which he was also nominated for Best Adapted Screenplay, and for Best Original Screenplay for both The Big Chill and Grand Canyon (1991). He has often collaborated with his wife, Meg Kasdan, his brother, Mark Kasdan, and his sons, Jonathan Kasdan and Jake Kasdan.

== Early life ==
Kasdan was born in Miami Beach, Florida, the son of Sylvia, an employment counselor, and Clarence Kasdan, an electronics-store manager. Kasdan is Jewish. His older brother is Mark Kasdan, who co-wrote Silverado (1985) and produced Dreamcatcher (2003), and he has two sisters. Kasdan grew up in Morgantown, West Virginia. "I felt very fortunate to have had a regular American childhood in the fifties," he said. "It was a safe place, where you owned the town if you had a bicycle."

His parents were both "thwarted writers." His father, who died when Kasdan was 14, had wanted to be a playwright, and his mother claimed to have studied with novelist and playwright Sinclair Lewis at the University of Wisconsin. She sold a few stories to "confessional magazines" in the 1950s, and later bought self-help books and typed up their contents with the dream of writing her own book one day. She also struck up conversations with strangers on the bus, saying it was all "grist for the mill" for future writing. "Looking back on it now," Kasdan wrote, "I wonder if maybe I owe her everything. Whether by nature or nurture, I became a writer."

Many of Kasdan's movies were inspired by his "difficult childhood and home life," he wrote. "So, in my work, I've looked for something more stable or explored why growing up in my home was so upsetting."

"We didn't have a lot of money and neither did anyone around us, and going to the movies was the happiest thing about my childhood," he said. "Movies weren't very big in Wheeling in those days. We used to call up the theater to ask what time the show began, and they'd say, 'What time can you get here?'" He particularly loved The Great Escape (1963) and The Magnificent Seven (1960), both directed by John Sturges—movies that shaped his ideas of manhood and heroism. "Film made its values tangible for me in the ways that parents, school, Sunday School had not. I wanted to live in the world I found in the movies."

In 1963, his brother Mark took him to see David Lean's Lawrence of Arabia. They arrived a few minutes late, and Mark insisted that they kill six hours until the next showing. "I thought my brother was crazy. But when the show was over, I knew I had done the right thing. As I stumbled from the theater, having seen the whole movie, I had a new hero. It was not T. E. Lawrence, but David Lean".

He graduated from Morgantown High School in 1966. To earn money for college, he worked various jobs at a glass factory and the night shift at a supermarket in Wheeling, scraping meat from butcher machines. He applied to the University of Michigan because he was told it had the best-paying college writing contest in the country (the Hopwood Award), and that the playwright Arthur Miller had paid for his studies by winning the award. Miller's teacher, Kenneth Thorpe Rowe, was still a professor there, and Kasdan studied drama writing with Rowe.

Kasdan won the Hopwood Award four times between 1968 and 1970, winning a total of $2,000. "When I received the letter telling me that I had won Hopwood Awards in both fiction and drama, my life changed forever," he said. "It was the first sign the real world, the outside world, the big-time world, had given me that this was not just a hopeless dream. ... Even though I had many discouraging years after that, there was never a day after I received that letter that I doubted I would be able to make my way as a writer."

While in college, Kasdan marched on Washington to protest the Vietnam War. He also made one short film. "Technically, it was very crude," he said. "It was a wry look at a professor I knew who was very interested in all the young female students—sort of a rough, humorous film about his fascination with one particular girl. It was shot on 16mm. I cut it and did the sound, but I was never a technically proficient student filmmaker."

He was determined to become a director, and decided the best path was to write screenplays. He got into UCLA's writing program and briefly moved to Los Angeles, but found the experience frustrating and moved back to Ann Arbor, where he worked in a record store and continued writing screenplays.

He pursued a master's degree in education at the University of Michigan and graduated in 1971, with plans to support himself as a high-school English teacher until he broke into Hollywood. But he soon discovered that there were no high-school English teaching jobs. "It was almost as hard to get that kind of work as being a movie director," he said. The experience he did have as a student teacher later proved useful on film sets: "You can control an unruly class at almost any level, but the more you yell, the less effective yelling becomes," he said. "That has influenced my approach to directing; for me, being hard is giving someone a look where another director might scream at them."

== Career ==
Unable to find a teaching position, Kasdan took a job as an advertising copywriter at the W. B. Doner agency in Detroit—a profession he didn't enjoy but found success in, earning a Clio Award for his first TV commercial, as well as an award from The One Show. His supervisor, Jim Dale, remembered Kasdan "always said he was better at writing for TV than for print, and that was certainly prophetic." Kasdan called his five years in advertising "hellacious", and persisted in writing screenplays at night.

=== Screenwriter ===
==== Early career (1970s) ====
The Bodyguard

Kasdan's sixth finished screenplay, written in 1975, was about a singer who falls in love with her bodyguard. With The Bodyguard he was able to get an agent, Norman Kurland, and he took an advertising job in Los Angeles to further justify a move to California. Kurland sent the script around town for two years, and it was rejected 67 times. "We couldn't even get him a job writing Starsky and Hutch," Kurland said, although Kasdan had no desire to write for television. He was hired to write a treatment for a low-budget feature for Paramount, but the film was never made. He continued to write screenplays, including what he called an "un-producible historical" movie.

The Bodyguard was finally optioned by Warner Bros. in 1977 for $20,000. It was rewritten many times over the years, and attached to different actresses (including Diana Ross and Whoopi Goldberg) whose characters had various occupations. Kasdan wrote it with Steve McQueen in mind as the bodyguard, Frank. In the original draft, the U.S. president Frank failed to save was John F. Kennedy. Kevin Costner read the screenplay when Kasdan directed him in Silverado, the role that made him a star. In 1991, he asked Kasdan to make The Bodyguard with Costner in the title role. Kasdan had "messed around" with it so many times that he felt too burned out, and he was also preparing to direct Grand Canyon—so he chose instead to produce it with Costner, and they hired Mick Jackson, who had just made L.A. Story, to direct. Whitney Houston was cast as superstar singer Rachel Marron.

Kasdan was not happy with the way the film turned out, "but I think it had nothing to do with Mick Jackson," he later said. "I think it had to do with the fact that I'm not a good person for having other people direct my screenplays ... and so I was very unhappy with The Bodyguard. Kevin and I got very involved in the editing, which is not something I would normally do with any other director. I don't want people messing with my movie. But we were the producers and we had serious problems with it."

Despite receiving "probably the worst reviews I've ever had," Kasdan said, the film was a huge box-office success, earning more than $411 million worldwide. "If I had directed that film it probably wouldn't have done anything like that business," Kasdan wrote.

Continental Divide

While The Bodyguard was being passed around town, Kasdan wrote Continental Divide—a script about a brash Chicago journalist who falls in love with a woman living in the mountains studying eagles, in the vein of an old Spencer Tracy / Katharine Hepburn comedy. He came up with the outline while eating lunch on the lawn of the Los Angeles County Museum of Art.

Kurland shopped it around, and took it to Steven Spielberg, who was on the dubbing stage for Close Encounters of the Third Kind (1977). Spielberg had Universal buy the script for $150,000 in October 1977, with a desire to serve as executive producer. "I was looking for a love story to do," Spielberg said. "Actually, it was a very intense bidding situation. There were four studios bidding for it and Universal made the highest bid. The script was wonderful. Larry is an excellent writer. He writes the sort of material we haven't seen around here for a long time. He writes about the '30s and '40s in a fascinating, exciting way. He loves old movies and draws on them for his work. He's exploring new territory based on old ground."

The movie was eventually made several years later, starring John Belushi and Blair Brown and directed by Michael Apted. It came out on September 18, 1981, three weeks after the release of Kasdan's directorial debut, Body Heat.

According to Kasdan, the original script was "very different from the film which resulted. The script had a kind of Howard Hawksian speed, momentum, hopefully wit about it. I don't think the film turned out that way, which was one of those painful experiences I had early on."

==== Franchise writing (1980s–2010s) ====
Raiders of the Lost Ark

Spielberg's enthusiasm for Continental Divide led him to hire Kasdan to write Raiders of the Lost Ark, which he was developing with George Lucas. "I think that what they were looking for was someone who could write Raiders in the same way that Hawks would have someone write a movie for him—a strong woman character, a certain kind of hero," Kasdan said. In a now-famous meeting (with producer Frank Marshall also in the room), "George, Steven, and I talked for about 20 minutes. Then we stood up and shook hands, and George said, 'Let's make this movie.' I had just met the guy, and a few minutes later I'm in business with him."

"George said, 'We're going to do a movie that's like the old serials,'" Kasdan recalled. "'I don't know too much about it, but the hero is named after my dog, Indiana. I know the hero wears a fedora and a leather jacket and carries a whip.'" That the artifact would be the Biblical Ark of the Covenant was writer-director Philip Kaufman's idea. Kaufman got it from his orthodontist when he was 11 years old (at one point, Kaufman was going to be involved with the screenplay. He received a "story by" credit).

The rest of the plot was hashed out in a brainstorm session with Lucas, Spielberg, and Kasdan:

We had a tape recorder going, and George essentially guided the story process and the three of us pitched the entire movie in about five days. And that's where the fantasy of all our pent-up, wet-movie dreams coalesced. Most of the time we were on our feet, trying to out-shout each other with ideas.

They wound up with a hundred-page transcript, and Kasdan wrote the screenplay in Spielberg's office while the director was making 1941. It took him six months.

For the character of Indiana Jones, Kasdan said he wanted to capture the essence of old Hollywood stars like Errol Flynn, Burt Lancaster, and Clark Gable. "One of my favorite actors is Steve McQueen," he said. "I loved the poetry in the way he moved—his stylized movement. I wanted Raiders to have that heightened reality. That's where I came together with George's love of serials and Steven's fascination with kinetic thrust."

Lucas wanted the character to be more like James Bond, so Kasdan had to write a different version of the scene where Brody goes to his house, he said. "George wanted Indy to be a playboy, so Jones was going to answer the door wearing a tuxedo. Then, when Brody went into the house, he would see a beautiful, Harlow-type blonde sipping champagne in Indy's living room. My feeling was that Indiana Jones' two sides (professor and adventurer) made him complicated enough without adding the playboy element."

The film came out on June 12, 1981, and made more than $390 million internationally, winning five Academy Awards out of nine nominations. Kasdan eventually warmed to the finished film. "I look at Raiders now and I'm very proud of it," he wrote in 1999. "I think it's a terrific movie and I think Steven did a magnificent job with it." He was later asked to write Indiana Jones and the Temple of Doom, but declined because he didn't want to associate with the film; he perceived it as "horrible, mean and unpleasant" due to it being developed during a chaotic period in Spielberg's and Lucas's lives. Several elements from Kasdan's earlier Raiders draft found their way in the prequel. Kasdan semi-returned to the franchise in 2007 when he assisted David Koepp in writing some romantic dialogue for Indiana Jones and the Kingdom of the Crystal Skull.

Star Wars: Episode V—The Empire Strikes Back

Lucas initially hired Leigh Brackett, the sci-fi novelist who also wrote screenplays for Howard Hawks—including The Big Sleep (1946)—to write the sequel to Star Wars (1977). But Brackett died in March 1978, while the film was still in pre-production, and Lucas was dissatisfied with her script. He wrote the next draft himself, which established structure and twists close to the final film, but needed dialogue polishing. When Kasdan delivered his script for Raiders, Lucas asked him to rewrite The Empire Strikes Back. Kasdan suggested he read Raiders first, but Lucas reportedly said: "If I hate Raiders, I'll call you up tomorrow and cancel this offer, but basically I get a feeling about people."

Most of the plot elements and characters were already in place, but Kasdan helped in part make it darker than the first Star Wars. "George was open to it and ready to have it happen," he said. "Over the three Star Wars films, he saw a trajectory. The Empire Strikes Back was the second act, and traditionally, the second act is when things start to go bad. George had made his [most important] decision when he hired Irvin Kershner to direct, even though Kershner and I were acting as his tools."

When The Empire Strikes Back came out on May 21, 1980, it was the first time Kasdan's name appeared in a movie's credits. He felt his main contribution to Lucas's series was developing character. "George is one of the good guys," Kasdan said in 1981. "But he and I have some disagreements, too. George thinks if you play the commercial movie game, a very expensive game, you have to play for big stakes."

Star Wars: Episode VI—Return of the Jedi

Kasdan launched his directing career after writing The Empire Strikes Back, and was uninterested in writing another Star Wars movie. But Lucas had supported him on Body Heat as an uncredited producer, so when Lucas asked him to write the screenplay for the third chapter (then titled Revenge of the Jedi), Kasdan felt obliged to repay him.

He spent the summer of 1981 co-writing the shooting script with Lucas (based on a story by Lucas). "In both the Star Wars movies it's really George's story," Kasdan said. "I came into Empire after there was already a draft. On Jedi, George had done a draft, which we changed radically. Then he and I really collaborated on the script."

Return of the Jedi came out on May 25, 1983, and made $475 million. Lucas had already publicly spoken about making both a prequel and sequel trilogy; the prequels he wrote and directed himself 20 years later, and the Walt Disney Company made episodes 7 through 9 after it purchased Lucasfilm in 2012. In 1981, Kasdan surmised that "they'll probably shoot the before-Luke trilogy next, about young Darth and young Ben. But with George, you can't be sure. For myself, I can only say this will be my last Star Wars movie. On the other hand, you never know. I didn't think I'd be working on this one." During the Star Wars prequels' development, Lucas constantly approached Kasdan to help him write them, but Kasdan resisted returning to the franchise, opining that Lucas should do the prequels as he wished given the creative clashes Lucas had with him, Kershner and Richard Marquand during the original trilogy's development, despite that Lucas thought it would be great for Kasdan to take a second pass at the screenplays.

Star Wars: Episode VII—The Force Awakens

When Disney bought Lucasfilm with plans to make more Star Wars films, Kathleen Kennedy, Lucasfilm's new president, asked Kasdan to be involved. "I said, 'I don't really want to ... I just feel like I've done this,'" he recalled. "They said, 'We want to do a movie about Han.' That got me. That was the only one that could possibly have gotten me."

Kennedy had hired Michael Arndt to write Episode VII, and she asked Kasdan if he would consult on that script as well. He always felt that "Han Solo is really the character that people find irresistible, not Luke," he said. "Luke is too good for people to invest in. Han is right out of the classic mold. He's William Holden. He's Jimmy Cagney. He's Humphrey Bogart. Han is the one who is compromised and reluctantly forced to be altruistic and heroic." He had wanted to kill Han off in Return of the Jedi. "We're closing off the trilogy," he said. "And we want to lose somebody important. It would give some stakes to this thing. And George did not like it." In The Force Awakens, he and actor Harrison Ford finally got their wish.

Star Wars: The Force Awakens came out on December 18, 2015. It made more than $2 billion internationally, breaking the North American record for top-grossing film of all time. In his review for The Hollywood Reporter, Todd McCarthy wrote: "One notably feels the hand of Lawrence Kasdan, who ... co-wrote The Empire Strikes Back and Return of the Jedi and, perhaps more significantly, authored Raiders of the Lost Ark, the film this new one most resembles in terms of its incident and exuberance."

Kasdan, Abrams, and Arndt won the Saturn Award for Best Writing for The Force Awakens. This marked Kasdan's first win for a Star Wars film, after being nominated for The Empire Strikes Back and Return of the Jedi.

Despite not working in the following sequels, Kasdan later talked with Abrams, Lucas, and Rian Johnson about the story for the saga's last episode, Star Wars: The Rise of Skywalker.

Solo: A Star Wars Story

Kasdan wrote the screenplay for a Han Solo origin story—the one assignment with Disney and Lucasfilm he initially signed on for—with his son, Jonathan Kasdan, a writer and director. The younger Kasdan had had small roles in his father's movies since The Big Chill, but they had never written a script together.

Solo: A Star Wars Story details the character's backstory: how he got his name, how he met Chewbacca and Lando Calrissian, and the beginnings of his internal battle between self-interested scoundrel and hero. Alden Ehrenreich was cast in the role Ford originated. The production was plagued by drama; most notably, the original directors—Phil Lord and Christopher Miller—were fired during the shoot and replaced by Ron Howard. The film opened on May 25, 2018, and made just under $393 million worldwide. Kasdan later attributed Solo's underperformance to Lucasfilm "blowing it", after which he left the Star Wars universe as promised, not responding to any of Lucasfilm's subsequent attempts to woo him back, even sending him a messenger with a new script.

=== Director ===
==== Body Heat (1981) ====
After writing Raiders of the Lost Ark and The Empire Strikes Back, Kasdan had the cachet to direct his own film.

Alan Ladd Jr., the head of 20th Century Fox and a key player on Star Wars, gave Kasdan the deal—but by the time the script was finished Ladd was no longer at Fox. The new president, Sherry Lansing, put many of the existing deals in turnaround, including Kasdan's. Ladd started The Ladd Company in 1979, and offered to produce Body Heat on one condition: that an established director would "sponsor" the untested Kasdan. So Kasdan reached out to George Lucas.

The producers wanted Kasdan to cast a star, but he insisted on William Hurt, a stage actor who had just made his film debut in Altered States (1980). Kasdan cast another unknown, Kathleen Turner, as Matty, and Ted Danson as one of Ned's colleagues. (Danson was offered the part of Sam Malone on Cheers while filming Body Heat.) The heat-centric story was originally set in New Jersey, but an actors' strike delayed production until December, so the location was moved to Miami.

Body Heat opened on August 28, 1981. It made more than $24 million domestically on a $7 million budget and was praised by the majority of critics. Variety's review called it "an engrossing, mightily stylish meller [melodrama] in which sex and crime walk hand in hand down the path to tragedy, just like in the old days. Working in the imposing shadow of the late James M. Cain, screenwriter Lawrence Kasdan makes an impressively confident directorial debut with a vehicle which could clinch star status for William Hurt."

The Los Angeles Film Critics Association Awards nominated Kasdan for Best Director, and the Writers Guild of America nominated his screenplay for a WGA Award.

==== The Big Chill (1983) ====
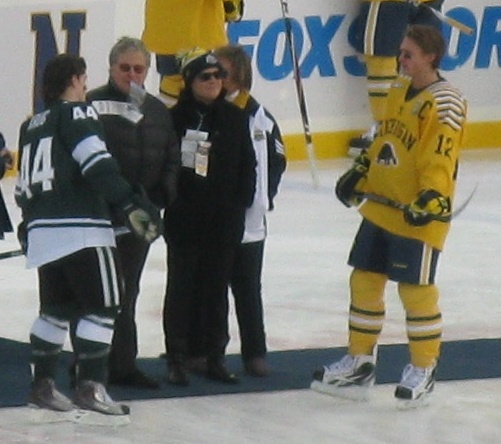
Kasdan and The Big Chill co-writer Barbara Benedek participate in the ceremonial puck drop for The Big Chill at the Big House ice hockey game in 2010, flanked by Michigan men's ice hockey co-captain Carl Hagelin and Michigan State men's ice hockey captain Torey Krug

While editing Body Heat Kasdan had the idea for a large ensemble film, partly in reaction to the "claustrophobic" experience of working with just two actors in intimate settings.

His lawyer's wife, Barbara Benedek, had begun writing screenplays (and was a story editor on two comedy TV series for ABC), and Kasdan proposed co-writing with her. She was "enormously influential on the tone" of the script, he said, and they wrote characters who were composites of real people they each knew—as well as "a little bit of ourselves".

Kasdan had trouble finding a buyer, because "no one believed that an ensemble film could be commercially successful. Hollywood always wanted you to have a protagonist, hopefully a white male who the audience could invest in, and possibly a sidekick or possibly a woman that he was involved with. When I presented them with a movie that had eight protagonists, they were only confused." He pitched it to "around seventeen different places," but they all passed. Johnny Carson had a deal to make movies at Columbia, and producer Marcia Nasatir convinced Carson to make The Big Chill.

The ensemble cast included Hurt and Kevin Kline, both of whom became regulars in Kasdan's directing career, as well as Glenn Close, Jeff Goldblum, Mary Kay Place, Tom Berenger, and JoBeth Williams. After four weeks of rehearsal, the film was shot in a real house in South Carolina, which had been used in The Great Santini. John Bailey, husband of editor Carol Littleton, was the cinematographer. The '60s pop soundtrack was curated by Kasdan's wife, Meg. The album sold more than six million copies and is one of the best-selling soundtracks of all time.

The Big Chill came out on September 30, 1983. It ran in theaters for six months, making more than $56 million on an $8 million budget, and received mostly praise, with some mixed reviews.

The film was nominated for three Academy Awards: for best original screenplay, best supporting actress (Close), and best picture. The screenplay was nominated for a BAFTA Award and a Los Angeles Film Critics Association Award, and it won the WGA Award. Kasdan earned a DGA Award nomination by the Directors Guild of America. He later said:

It was a kind of a lightning rod to controversy. I think I was surprised by everything that happened to The Big Chill because it was so personal. It was so much about my life, Barbara's life, and my wife's life that when it became very popular I was surprised.

Film critic F. X. Feeney wrote: "Kasdan fashioned a national conversation piece. People spoke thereafter of 'The Big Chill Generation.' Films made by later generations, about those generations ... would have to endure being dubbed 'The Little Chill' by critics. (So, in a sense, Kasdan founded a new genre.)"

==== Silverado (1985) ====
Kasdan co-wrote Silverado's screenplay with his brother, Mark Kasdan. The story, set in 1880, is about a motley crew of cowboys who team up and set aside self-interest to protect a small town from a corrupt sheriff.

He cast Kevin Kline for the second time, as lead cowboy Paden, along with Scott Glenn, Danny Glover (who reunited with Kasdan in Grand Canyon), and Kevin Costner (who re-teamed with Kasdan for another western, Wyatt Earp). Brian Dennehy was cast as the sheriff, and Kasdan's son Jonathan and wife Meg both had bit parts.

The film shot in New Mexico during the winter of 1984, and an entire town set was built near Santa Fe that was later reused in several films, including Wyatt Earp. During production some of the cast developed hypothermia, and Kasdan had to contend with both blizzards and flash floods.

The film was so popular at its test screening in Seattle that Columbia rushed its release by several months, without arranging the usual marketing and merchandising efforts in time. It came out on July 10, 1985, and did decent business—$32 million on a $26 million budget—but Kasdan felt it would have done better with a more concerted release strategy. The reviews were largely positive.

The film earned Oscar nominations for best sound and best original score (composed by Bruce Broughton). Kasdan won the Young Venice Award—Special Mention at the Venice Film Festival.

==== The Accidental Tourist (1988) ====
After making Silverado, Kasdan passed on The Untouchables (1987) because he didn't like the script; it was directed by Brian De Palma. He had also been developing Man Trouble (1992), but disagreed with the producers over Carole Eastman's screenplay. Then he was offered The Accidental Tourist, a novel by Anne Tyler, and despite its surface similarities to Man Trouble—both stories are odd-couple romances with a character who trains dogs—he "fell in love with it".

John Malkovich had been developing the project, and hired theater director Frank Galati to write a script. When Kasdan took over, he wrote his own adaptation—ultimately sharing writing credit with Galati. Like many of Kasdan's own stories, this one was "about creating a new family to replace a dysfunctional one," he said. For the lead, he cast Hurt for the third time.

Kasdan and Hurt reunited with Body Heat's Kathleen Turner, playing Macon's estranged wife. For the eccentric dog trainer, Muriel, Kasdan cast Geena Davis, who won an Academy Award for Best Supporting Actress.

The Accidental Tourist was a surprise hit when it came out on December 23, 1988. It made more than $32 million, and rode a wave of critical praise through the awards season. It won the New York Film Critics Award despite sharp criticism from several critics—including Pauline Kael, who felt the film had no voice.

The film earned two Golden Globe nominations (for Best Motion Picture - Drama and Best Score), a BAFTA nomination (Best Adapted Screenplay), and four Oscar nominations: Best Original Score (John Williams), Best Adapted Screenplay, and Best Picture. Davis won an Oscar for her supporting role.

"I have sometimes been frustrated by the size of my audience, but not on that movie," said Kasdan. "I'm amazed we got as many people in to see it as we did. It was one of the most satisfying experiences I've ever had. I'm as proud of The Accidental Tourist as anything I've done."

==== I Love You to Death (1990) ====
Kasdan wanted to do something "light and irreverent" after the grief-heavy The Accidental Tourist, and John Kostmayer sent him a script based on a true story out of Pennsylvania: a woman tried to kill her husband multiple times over his infidelity, he survived all attempts, she and her accomplices went to prison, and when she got out the husband forgave her and took her back. "I was fascinated by that story," Kasdan said. "I thought it would make a wonderful film."

It was the first film he directed from another writer's script, and starred Kline as pizzeria owner and serial cheater Joey, and Tracey Ullman as his wife, Rosalie. The ensemble cast included Hurt, River Phoenix, Joan Plowright, and Keanu Reeves. The film was shot in Tacoma, Washington.

In 1999, Kasdan wrote:

I have more regrets about I Love You to Death than anything I've done, because Kostmayer had written an odd and interesting script. It was very funny to me, but there were things in it that were ugly. In postproduction we started sneaking [test screening] it, and most of the sneak audiences hated the movie—despised it. They hated certain things, and I started taking those things out. We reshot the ending, added new scenes, and took out scenes that were difficult. I wanted to make the movie more popular, and that was weak, because it got worse and worse. As a result, I've never used those sneak preview cards since. It wasn't as if the studio was making me change things. I ruined the movie.

I Love You to Death came out on April 6, 1990. It made $16 million, and reviews were largely negative or mixed.

==== Grand Canyon (1991) ====
Now in his 40s, with his oldest son leaving for college, Kasdan began a screenplay about marriage and parenting. He said:

Seeing your children grow throws your own life into relief. They're a daily reminder that you're moving on because they're so clearly coming up from behind. That driving lesson [in Grand Canyon] is about more than the difficulty of making left turns in Los Angeles. Giving your son the wheel is about letting go ... and the threat of disaster in the most mundane actions.

The screenplay, which he wrote with his wife, swelled into a larger canvas that dealt with race relations in Los Angeles and the existential crises of the era. On a $20 million budget, Kasdan cast two of his regular actors—Kline and Glover—along with Steve Martin, Mary McDonnell, Mary-Louise Parker, and Alfre Woodard. (The actors took smaller salaries in exchange for profit participation.) The film follows separate but intersecting stories of multiple characters across Los Angeles's social and racial divides, and deals with themes of fate, death, relationships, the ethics of violence in filmmaking, and more. The score is by James Newton Howard, who has worked with Kasdan on every film since.

Grand Canyon came out on December 25, 1991. The ensemble cast and social/generational commentary immediately drew comparisons to The Big Chill, and reviews were mostly positive.

The screenplay was nominated for an Academy Award, a Golden Globe, and a WGA Award. Some critics found the finale, which has the ensemble staring in awe at the actual Grand Canyon, to be a cop-out happy ending.

Within months of the film's release, the 1992 Los Angeles riots occurred. "There was an enormous amount of press about the fact that Grand Canyon had predicted the explosion of rage and violence," Kasdan said. "Anyone walking around L.A. at that time could feel it. The riots were a natural kind of explosion that anyone could have predicted."

==== Wyatt Earp (1994) ====
One of Kasdan's abandoned projects over the years was titled Pair-A-Dice, written by Blade Runner (1982) screenwriter David Webb Peoples, which he developed for four years, with Costner set to star. In 1992, Costner approached him with the script for a six-hour miniseries about Wyatt Earp's life. "I told him that I was about to commit to another picture," Kasdan said. "[Costner] said, 'Why are you doing that? Why don't you do Wyatt Earp? I said, 'I don't like the screenplay.' And he said, 'Well, then, write a new screenplay.'" Kasdan agreed on the condition that they shoot the following summer, which Costner accepted. Kasdan wrote a screenplay in three months.

Kasdan was pleased with his screenplay—but less so Costner, who was still attached to the original miniseries concept. "Kevin and I were visualizing a 'Western Godfather,'" said Dan Gordon, who wrote the miniseries script. "It was to be two movies, in fact, centering on three families: the Earps and two organized crime families. Mike Gray, a bizarro mirror image of Earp, managed to get Tombstone, the richest town west of the Mississippi, deeded to his private company. It was a land grab worth $10 million to $20 million in 1880 dollars—and the only thing between him and that money was Wyatt Earp."

Kasdan said:

At that point we probably should have called the whole thing off, but we didn't. Instead, we reached a kind of compromise script. I had never had that experience before, because everything that I had ever written I had just gone out and shot as is. Here I had this kind of hybrid. It was my script plus elements from his previous script.

Kasdan ultimately shared writing credit with Gordon, who also served as an executive producer on the film.

I think it confused the whole situation, and if I had my wits about me I probably would have said, "Kevin, look, because we're very good friends let's preserve our friendship and not do this movie." Well, we preserved our friendship, but unfortunately we did do the movie.

Surrounding Costner as Earp were Joanna Going, Catherine O'Hara, Tom Sizemore, JoBeth Williams, Mark Harmon, and Gene Hackman. Dennis Quaid lost 43 pounds on a supervised diet to play Doc Holliday, a performance that Kasdan called "the most satisfying part of the movie."

Wyatt Earp was a more ambitious production than Kasdan's previous western, Silverado. It was shot in the summer of 1993 over the course of 19 weeks (with an entire week of rehearsals), on location in and around Santa Fe, New Mexico, with two massive sets portraying eight different Western towns, and a cast of more than 100 speaking roles and thousands of extras. It was shot on film in anamorphic format by Owen Roizman, the cinematographer on The French Connection.

"It's an epic film on an epic scale," Kasdan said. "It shows the building of the railroad and a span of Wyatt's life. So in many ways it presented the challenges I was looking for. It's a big bite of a movie and there are things in it that are as good as anything I've ever done."

The film suffered at the box office—making $20 million on a $60 million budget—in part because of Tombstone, the concurrent film starring Kurt Russell as Earp and Val Kilmer as Holliday. Tombstone's writer and original director, Kevin Jarre (who was eventually fired from the project), had actually planned to make an Earp story with Costner, but the two had different ideas about its tone and direction, and each went his own way. Tombstone was in production at the same time, but released on Christmas Eve, 1993—six months before Wyatt Earp.

"Tombstone hurt us," said editor Carol Littleton, "because it's a completely different kind of film, and it was a little more hip and it was not quite as serious."

==== Later films (1995–present) ====
French Kiss (1995)

Meg Ryan, who at the time was married to Wyatt Earp star Dennis Quaid, brought Kasdan a script she'd commissioned for herself. Written by Adam Brooks, it was about a woman who overcomes her fear of flying and goes to Paris to confront her cheating fiancé, and in the process falls for a French thief. Kasdan was drawn to the project, he said, because "I wouldn't have to write something new. I'd just done this really difficult movie and I thought, well, I'll go to France with my family for a while. I love France."

He cast Timothy Hutton as the cheating fiancé, Charlie, and Kline as Luc Teyssier, the thief.

French Kiss was released on May 5, 1995. It earned nearly $39 million in the U.S. and more than $101 million internationally.

Mumford (1999)

After French Kiss, Kasdan wrote a spec script for Disney called Sojourner—a large-scale fantasy film set in the 1930s about a father and son. "I love effects," he said, "but they very rarely are married to a story that interests me. So I wrote one of my kind of stories, one involving effects. It made for a very expensive project, requiring not just one but two movie stars." He went into pre-production on the film with Mel Gibson attached to star—but then pulled the plug, and instead wrote the screenplay for Mumford.

The story is about a psychologist named Mumford with a secret past, who moves to a town called Mumford and starts treating its troubled citizens. Kasdan cast Loren Dean in the title role, alongside Hope Davis, Jason Lee, Mary McDonnell, Alfre Woodard, Martin Short, and Ted Danson. It came out on September 24, 1999, and fared poorly at the box office, making only $4.5 million. Critical response was divided.

Dreamcatcher (2003)

Kasdan's most poorly received film was Dreamcatcher, an adaptation of Stephen King's 2001 book. Written during King's recovery from being hit by a van in 1999, the story is about four friends and a boy with special powers, involving aliens, telepathy, and extreme body horror. King later said he wrote much of it on Oxycontin.

Kasdan co-wrote the adaptation with William Goldman, screenwriter of Butch Cassidy and the Sundance Kid and The Princess Bride. "If you read the book," Kasdan said, "the pain is all over the book."

Dreamcatcher was produced by Castle Rock Entertainment and shot in British Columbia. The cast included Morgan Freeman, Thomas Jane, Damian Lewis, Timothy Olyphant, and Donnie Wahlberg. It came out on March 21, 2003, and made $82 million worldwide.

Darling Companion (2012)

Nine years passed between Dreamcatcher and Kasdan's next film, Darling Companion. During that time he adapted a script from Richard Russo's novel The Risk Pool, which he was developing with Tom Hanks as the lead, as well as a few other aborted projects. He eventually decided to make an independent film, based on an incident from his and Meg's own life, when their dog got lost in the mountains of Colorado.

Darling Companion was independently financed by his company, Kasdan Pictures, along with Werc Werk Works and Likely Story. Since it was made on a modest $5 million budget, the ensemble cast—which included Kline, Diane Keaton, Richard Jenkins, Dianne Wiest, and Mark Duplass—worked for scale. Kasdan shot the film on digital for the first time, on location in Utah. It came out on April 27, 2012.

=== Projects in development ===
As of 2020, Kasdan is working on a documentary about record label executive Mo Ostin, and the adaptation of a novel called November Road.

"Directing is the greatest job in the world, but the process is so hard," he said in 1991. "Each picture is like a child, a huge investment of heart and work. I decided that I want to work a lot while I have the interest in and the energy for it. Then if the time comes when I'm not having fun, I can walk away." As of 2022, Kasdan has directed only two feature films in 22 years.

=== Style and inspirations ===
As a screenwriter, Kasdan was influenced by classic English literature, plays, and the literary films of the 1940s, '50s, and '60s. He said:

If you're trained the way I was, it's classical dramatic training, in which you learn how plays have been constructed since they started writing plays. I think that has served me very well in Hollywood, because a lot of the people writing screenplays don't have a literary background. Many young screenwriters today come from television. It's not that they worked in television; it's that they grew up on television and they think the way narrative is presented on television is narrative, but it ain't. And so, if anything, I believe in classic dramatic construction, and I believe in the force and momentum that good narrative creates as it builds on itself.

He said his scripts all begin with their characters:

Characters present themselves, and the story follows. Alvin Sargent [screenwriter of Julia (1977) and Ordinary People (1980)] said a great thing to me. We were talking about how all of our inspiration always starts with character. Not plot. Not story. And that we wish it were otherwise; and that, in fact, the American movie tradition is about narrative. It's not about character. And he said, 'When I die, on my tombstone, it's going to say: 'Finally, a plot." I identified with that very strongly.

Of his directing style, Kasdan said:

I think that my personality is shy, reticent, in some ways; I'm conservative—I don't wear flashy clothes. I think that's true of my style, too, not that I don't like things that are startlingly innovative. ... For me, the idea is, is the camera where you want it to be, not are you showing it off? ... What I admire about Kurosawa is the Zen perfection of his camera placement, the rightness of it. That's the idea I'm striving for—but style is not something that drives my pictures.

On working with actors, he said:

I'm drawn to a very strong, non-fussy, hopefully a non-absorbed, kind of acting. I want great listeners. They aren't in competition with the other actors in the frame. They're there to support and to make the other actor better. I'm interested in people who are interested in submitting themselves to roles, to a story, to knowing that sometimes the grander action is the wrong action, the showier action is the wrong action. Sometimes repose is the most appropriate response to something. My movies are cut and acted on the reactions, not the actions. I think that's where the secrets of life are revealed. Not necessarily in what we say, but how we react to what we hear.

In 2012, Kasdan participated in the Sight & Sound film polls. Held every ten years to select the greatest films of all time, contemporary directors were asked to select ten films of their choice. Kasdan picked the following, in alphabetical order:

- Army of Shadows (1969)
- The Battle of Algiers (1966)
- Dr. Strangelove (1964)
- The Godfather (1972)
- The Grapes of Wrath (1940)
- Lawrence of Arabia (1962)
- Out of the Past (1947)
- The Rules of the Game (1939)
- Seven Samurai (1954)
- The Treasure of the Sierra Madre (1947)

=== Producer and onscreen parts ===
Kasdan has produced several films he did not direct: Cross My Heart (1987), Immediate Family (1989)—written by his The Big Chill co-writer Barbara Benedek—Jumpin' at the Boneyard (1991), Home Fries (1998), The TV Set (2006)—written and directed by Jake Kasdan—and In the Land of Women (2007), written and directed by Jonathan Kasdan.

He has made several cameo appearances in his own films: as River Phoenix's lawyer in I Love You to Death, a director in Grand Canyon, a gambler in Wyatt Earp, and a man walking a dog in Darling Companion. He played Jack Nicholson's psychiatrist in As Good as It Gets (1997), directed by James L. Brooks.

== Filmography ==
=== Films ===
==== Filmmaking credits ====
Year	Title	Director	Writer	Producer	Notes
1980	The Empire Strikes Back	No	Yes	No	
1981	Raiders of the Lost Ark	No	Yes	No	
1981	Body Heat	Yes	Yes	No	
1981	Continental Divide	No	Yes	No	
1983	Return of the Jedi	No	Yes	No	
1983	The Big Chill	Yes	Yes	Executive	
1985	Silverado	Yes	Yes	Yes	
1987	Cross My Heart	No	No	Yes	
1988	The Accidental Tourist	Yes	Yes	Yes	
1989	Immediate Family	No	No	Executive	
1990	I Love You to Death	Yes	No	No	
1991	Grand Canyon	Yes	Yes	Yes	
1992	Jumpin' at the Boneyard	No	No	Executive	
1992	The Bodyguard	No	Yes	Yes	
1994	Wyatt Earp	Yes	Yes	Yes	
1995	French Kiss	Yes	No	No	
1998	Home Fries	No	No	Yes	
1999	Mumford	Yes	Yes	Yes	
2003	Dreamcatcher	Yes	Yes	Yes	
2006	The TV Set	No	No	Executive	
2007	In the Land of Women	No	No	Executive	
2012	Darling Companion	Yes	Yes	Yes	
2015	Star Wars: The Force Awakens	No	Yes	No	Also creative consultant & uncredited co-producer
2018	Solo: A Star Wars Story	No	Yes	Executive	
2019	Last Week at Ed's	Yes	No	Yes	Co-directed with Meg Kasdan; documentary short
2026	Marty, Life Is Short	Yes	No	Yes	Documentary

Also uncredited wrote early screenplay for Clash of the Titans (2010).

==== Acting credits ====
Year	Title	Role	Notes
1985	Into the Night	Detective #2	
1990	I Love You to Death	Devo's Lawyer	Uncredited
1991	Grand Canyon	Director in screening room	Uncredited
1994	Wyatt Earp	Gambler	Uncredited
1997	As Good as It Gets	Dr. Green	
2012	Darling Companion	Man on Street	Uncredited

=== Streaming series ===
Years	Title	Director	Executive producer	Notes	Network
2022—2025	Light & Magic	Season 1	Yes	Documentary; directed 6 episodes	Disney+

== Receptions and box office ==
Title	Reception			Box office	
Title	Rotten Tomatoes	Metacritic	CinemaScore	Budget	Gross
Body Heat	98% (40 reviews)	77 (11 reviews)	—N/a	$9 million	$24 million
The Big Chill	67% (36 reviews)	61 (12 reviews)	—N/a	$8 million	$56.4 million
Silverado	76% (33 reviews)	64 (14 reviews)	—N/a	$23 million	$32.1 million
The Accidental Tourist	81% (31 reviews)	53 (12 reviews)	—N/a	—N/a	$32.6 million
I Love You to Death	58% (24 reviews)	45 (13 reviews)	C	—N/a	$16.2 million
Grand Canyon	77% (35 reviews)	64 (15 reviews)	B+	—N/a	$40.9 million
Wyatt Earp	44% (27 reviews)	47 (20 reviews)	B+	$63 million	$25.1 million
French Kiss	48% (25 reviews)	50 (14 reviews)	B+	—N/a	$102 million
Mumford	57% (81 reviews)	62 (33 reviews)	C+	$28 million	$4.6 million
Dreamcatcher	29% (180 reviews)	35 (38 reviews)	C+	$68 million	$75.7 million
Darling Companion	22% (88 reviews)	41 (38 reviews)	—N/a	$12 million	$793 815
Last Week at Ed's	—N/a	—N/a	—N/a	—N/a	—N/a
Light & Magic (Season 1)	100% (12 reviews)	—N/a	—N/a	—N/a	—N/a

== Awards and honors ==
In addition to his four Oscar nominations, Kasdan received the Austin Film Festival's Distinguished Screenwriter Award in 2001, and the Laurel Award for Screenwriting Achievement from the Writers Guild of America in 2006. He has three honorary doctorates: in Humane Letters from the University of Michigan (1983) and from West Virginia University (1999), and in Fine Arts from the American Film Institute (2015).

On May 22, 2016, he was honored by the Atlanta Jewish Film Festival and ArtsATL.org as the inaugural recipient of their ICON Award for Contributions to the Cinematic Arts in a ceremony held at the Woodruff Arts Center.

Organization	Year	Category	Nominated work	Result	Ref.
Academy Awards	1984	Best Screenplay – Written Directly for the Screen	The Big Chill	Nominated	
Academy Awards	1989	Best Picture	The Accidental Tourist	Nominated	
Academy Awards	1989	Best Screenplay – Based on Material from Another Medium	The Accidental Tourist	Nominated	
Academy Awards	1992	Best Screenplay – Written Directly for the Screen	Grand Canyon	Nominated	
British Academy Film Awards	1985	Best Original Screenplay	The Big Chill	Nominated	
British Academy Film Awards	1990	Best Adapted Screenplay	The Accidental Tourist	Nominated	
Directors Guild of America Awards	1984	Outstanding Directing – Feature Film	The Big Chill	Nominated	
Edgar Allan Poe Awards	1982	Best Motion Picture Screenplay	Body Heat	Nominated	
Golden Globe Awards	1984	Best Screenplay	The Big Chill	Nominated	
Golden Globe Awards	1992	Best Screenplay	Grand Canyon	Nominated	
Golden Raspberry Awards	1993	Worst Picture	The Bodyguard	Nominated	
Golden Raspberry Awards	1993	Worst Screenplay	The Bodyguard	Nominated	
Golden Raspberry Awards	1995	Worst Picture	Wyatt Earp	Nominated	
Golden Raspberry Awards	1995	Worst Screenplay	Wyatt Earp	Nominated	
Golden Raspberry Awards	1995	Worst Remake or Sequel	Wyatt Earp	Won	
Hugo Award	1981	Best Dramatic Presentation	The Empire Strikes Back	Won	
Hugo Award	1982	Best Dramatic Presentation	Raiders of the Lost Ark	Won	
Hugo Award	1984	Best Dramatic Presentation	Return of the Jedi	Won	
Hugo Award	2016	Best Dramatic Presentation	Star Wars: The Force Awakens	Nominated	
Saturn Awards	1981	Best Writing	The Empire Strikes Back	Nominated	
Saturn Awards	1982	Best Writing	Raiders of the Lost Ark	Won	
Saturn Awards	1984	Best Writing	Return of the Jedi	Nominated	
Saturn Awards	2016	Best Writing	Star Wars: The Force Awakens	Won	
Writers Guild of America Awards	1981	Best Comedy Adapted from Another Medium	The Empire Strikes Back	Nominated	
Writers Guild of America Awards	1982	Best Drama Written Directly for the Screenplay	Body Heat	Nominated	
Writers Guild of America Awards	1982	Best Comedy Written Directly for the Screenplay	Raiders of the Lost Ark	Nominated	
Writers Guild of America Awards	1984	Best Comedy Written Directly for the Screenplay	The Big Chill	Won	
Writers Guild of America Awards	1984	Best Screenplay Based on Material from Another Medium	The Accidental Tourist	Nominated	
Writers Guild of America Awards	1992	Best Screenplay Written Directly for the Screenplay	Grand Canyon	Nominated	
Writers Guild of America Awards	2006	Laurel Award for Screenwriting Achievement	Himself	Honored	

== Personal life ==
Kasdan has been married to Meg Kasdan (née Mary Ellen Goldman) since November 28, 1971. They met at the University of Michigan, where they were both English majors. Their two sons, Jake Kasdan and Jonathan Kasdan, are both involved in film as actors, writers, producers, and directors. He has three grandchildren.

In 2025, Kasdan donated his archives to the University of Michigan, which is incorporating them into their Screen Arts Mavericks and Makers collection.
