= Body Heat =

1981 film by Lawrence Kasdan

- Theatrical release poster
- Directed by: Lawrence Kasdan
- Written by: Lawrence Kasdan
- Produced by: Fred T. Gallo
- Starring: William Hurt; Kathleen Turner; Richard Crenna
- Cinematography: Richard H. Kline
- Edited by: Carol Littleton
- Music by: John Barry
- Production company: The Ladd Company
- Distributed by: Warner Bros.
- Release date: August 28, 1981
- Running time: 113 minutes
- Country: United States
- Language: English
- Budget: $9 million
- Box office: $24 million

Body Heat is a 1981 American neo-noir erotic thriller film written and directed by Lawrence Kasdan in his directorial debut. It stars William Hurt and Kathleen Turner, featuring Richard Crenna, Ted Danson, J. A. Preston, and Mickey Rourke. The film was inspired by the 1944 film noir Double Indemnity, in turn based on the 1943 novel.

The film launched Turner's career—Empire magazine cited the film in 1995 when it named her one of the "100 Sexiest Stars in Film History". The New York Times wrote in 2005 that, propelled by her "jaw-dropping movie debut [in] Body Heat ... she built a career on adventurousness and frank sexuality born of robust physicality".

== Plot ==
In sultry South Florida, at an outdoor concert, womanizing low-rent lawyer Ned Racine encounters beautiful, seductive Matty Walker, who initially rebuffs his approach, engages in suggestive repartee with him, then vanishes. Fascinated, Ned tracks her down, and the two begin a passionate affair. The wife of shady wealthy businessman Edmund Walker, Matty tells Ned she wants a divorce, but a prenuptial agreement would leave her with comparatively little money. When she wishes Edmund dead, Ned suggests murdering him. Matty suggests forging a new will, but Ned warns that would attract suspicion.

Ned runs into Matty and Edmund at a restaurant. Matty introduces Ned as a lawyer who asked about buying the Walkers' home. During dinner, Edmund disdains businessmen unwilling to do whatever unscrupulous act is necessary to succeed. After Matty briefly absents herself, Edmund says he would kill any man who had an affair with his wife.

Ned engages a previous client, arsonist/bombmaker Teddy Lewis, to build him an incendiary device. To fabricate an alibi, Ned checks into a Miami hotel then drives back home at night. After Ned kills Edmund, he and Matty move the body to an abandoned building owned by Edmund. Staging a botched attempt at arson for insurance fraud, Ned sets the bomb to destroy Edmund's body. Ned and Matty part and agree to have no contact until Matty takes possession of the estate.

Soon afterwards, Edmund's lawyer calls Ned about Edmund's new will, supposedly drafted by Ned. The witness is Mary Ann Simpson, a woman who visited Matty that Ned met and briefly mistook for Matty. The new will violates the rule against perpetuities, and the local judge, with a poor opinion of Ned, nullifies it, leaving Edmund intestate. Matty, the wife, becomes the sole beneficiary, disinheriting Edmund's niece, Heather. Ned realizes that Matty forged the will, calculating that it would be nullified. Claiming not to know that Ned had had a previous nullification, Matty admits that she once worked as a paralegal. She pleads for forgiveness, pledging her love for Ned. (Note: The plot of the film misrepresents Florida law on this point. Florida had abolished this advanced prohibition on perpetuities and had taken "a wait-and-see approach, under which the gift remains valid unless and until the interest actually fails to vest within the perpetuities period. Thus, the second will was entirely valid and Heather should have inherited half." The film was originally supposed to be filmed in the New York–New Jersey area, where the law against perpetuities aligned with the film's plot, but shooting and the setting moved to Florida and did not account for the change in that state's relevant law.)

The case is investigated by Ned's friends, prosecutor Peter Lowenstein and detective Oscar Grace. They suspect Matty is involved in her husband's death and warn Ned against seeing her; Ned begins openly dating Matty, counting on his womanizing reputation as a cover. The police deduce that Edmund was not killed at the arson scene because his glasses were missing. Also, Mary Ann Simpson cannot be located. Oscar begins to suspect Ned when his alibi in Miami does not hold. Edmund's niece, who once caught Matty and Ned having sex, is brought to the police station, but she fails to recognize Ned.

Increasingly wary of Matty's motives, Ned encounters an acquaintance who says he recommended Ned to Matty before they first met. Later, Teddy tells Ned that citing Ned’s name, a woman contacted him to build a bomb triggered by opening a door. Matty calls Ned, claiming her maid found the incriminating glasses and returned them after being paid off. She asks Ned to pick up the glasses from her boathouse. There, Ned spots a wire attached to the door. Matty arrives, and Ned asks her to get the glasses and she agrees. Oscar arrives and observes their interaction. After telling Ned that whatever happens, she really does love him, Matty walks to the boathouse, which explodes. A body found inside is later identified from dental records as Matty's.

Now in prison, Ned intuits (and tries to convince Oscar) that "Matty" is still alive. Ned believes she assumed the identity of a former schoolmate, Matty Tyler, to conceal her sordid past from Edmund. The "Mary Ann Simpson" he previously met was blackmailing Matty, who murdered and planted her in the boathouse, explaining why the dental records matched. Had Ned been killed in the explosion, the police would have found both suspects' bodies and closed the case.

Ned obtains a copy of Matty's high school yearbook. Photos of Mary Ann Simpson and Matty Tyler confirm the switch. Below Mary Ann's photo is the sobriquet "The Vamp" and "Ambition—To be rich and live in an exotic land". The real Mary Ann is seen lounging on a tropical beach living a new life.

== Cast ==
- William Hurt as Ned Racine
- Kathleen Turner as Matty Walker
- Richard Crenna as Edmund Walker
- Ted Danson as Peter Lowenstein
- J. A. Preston as Oscar Grace
- Mickey Rourke as Teddy Lewis
- Jane Hallaren as Stella
- Lanna Saunders as Roz Kraft
- Michael Ryan as Miles Hardin
- Larry Marko as Judge Costanza
- Kim Zimmer as Mary Ann Simpson
- Deborah Lucchesi as Beverly
- Lynn Hallowell as Angela
- Thom J. Sharp as Michael Glenn

In addition, the director's wife, Meg Kasdan, has a brief cameo at the beginning of the film as one of Racine's sexual partners – seen getting ready to leave his apartment to go to work.

== Production ==
Kasdan "wanted this film to have the intricate structure of a dream, the density of a good novel, and the texture of recognizable people in extraordinary circumstances." George Lucas acted as uncredited executive producer following successful collaborations with Kasdan as a scriptwriter on Raiders of the Lost Ark and The Empire Strikes Back. Christopher Reeve turned down the role of Ned Racine, which eventually went to his friend, William Hurt; Reeve would later regret the decision, though he was "glad for" his friend. Gail Matthius from Saturday Night Live auditioned for Turner's role.

A substantial portion of the film was shot in east-central Palm Beach County, Florida, including downtown Lake Worth and in the oceanside enclave of Manalapan. Additional scenes were shot on Hollywood Beach, Florida, such as the scene set in a band shell.

There was originally more graphic and extensive sex scene footage, but this was shown only in a sneak preview in two cities, including West Palm Beach, the area where it was filmed, and was edited out for the wide release. In an interview, Body Heat film editor Carol Littleton says, "Obviously, there was more graphic footage. But we felt that less was more."

== Music ==
In late 1980, Lawrence Kasdan met with four composers whose works he had admired, but only John Barry presented ideas which were close to the director's own. 10 demos were recorded on March 31 and Barry wrote the whole score during April and early May 1981. The composer provided several themes and leitmotifs—the most memorable was "Main Theme", heard during the main titles and representing Matty.

Barry worked closely with recording sessions engineer Dan Wallin to mix the soundtrack album, but for several reasons J.S Lasher (who produced the limited-edition LP and CD) remixed multitracks himself without Barry's or Wallin's participation.

J.S. Lasher's album was released several times: as a 45 RPM (Southern Cross LXSE 1.002) in 1983 and as a CD (Label X LXCD 2) in 1989. Both editions also included 'Ladd Company Logo' composed and conducted by John Williams.

In 1998, Varèse Sarabande released a re-recording by Joel McNeely and the London Symphony Orchestra. This CD contained several new tracks (versus J.S Lasher's editions), but still was not complete.

In August 2012, Film Score Monthly released a definitive two-disc edition: the complete score with alternate, unused, and source cues on disc 1, and the original, Barry-authorized album and theme demos on disc 2.

== Reception ==
=== Box office ===
Body Heat was a commercial success. In the United States and Canada, it grossed $24.1 million at the box office, against a budget of $9 million.

=== Critical response ===
On the review aggregator website Rotten Tomatoes, the film holds an approval rating of 96% based on 50 reviews, with an average rating of 8.1/10. The website's critics consensus reads, "Made from classic noir ingredients and flavored with a heaping helping of steamy modern spice, Body Heat more than lives up to its evocative title." Metacritic assigned the film a weighted average score of 77 out of 100 based on 11 critics, indicating "generally favorable reviews".

Upon its release, Richard Corliss wrote "Body Heat has more narrative drive, character congestion and sense of place than any original screenplay since Chinatown, yet it leaves room for some splendid young actors to breathe, to collaborate in creating the film's texture"; it is "full of meaty characters and pungent performances—Ted Danson as a tap-dancing prosecutor, J.A. Preston as a dogged detective, and especially Mickey Rourke as a savvy young ex-con who looks and acts as if he could be Ned's sleazier twin brother." Variety magazine wrote "Body Heat is an engrossing, mightily stylish meller in which sex and crime walk hand-in-hand down the path to tragedy, just like in the old days. Working in the imposing shadow of the late James M. Cain, screenwriter Lawrence Kasdan makes an impressively confident directorial debut". Roger Ebert included the film on his "10 Best List" for the year.

Janet Maslin wrote that Body Heat was "skillfully, though slavishly, derived" from 1940s film noir classics; she stated that, "Mr. Hurt does a wonderful job of bringing Ned to life," but was not impressed by Turner's performance:

Sex is all-important to Body Heat, as its title may indicate. And beyond that there isn't much to move the story along or to draw these characters together. A great deal of the distance between [Ned and Matty] can be attributed to the performance of Miss Turner, who looks like the quintessential forties siren, but sounds like the soap-opera actress she is. Miss Turner keeps her chin high in the air, speaks in a perfect monotone, and never seems to move from the position in which Mr. Kasdan has left her.

Pauline Kael dismissed the film, citing its "insinuating, hotted-up dialogue that it would be fun to hoot at if only the hushed, sleepwalking manner of the film didn't make you cringe or yawn". Ebert responded to Kael's negative review when he added the film to his "Great Movies" list:

Yes, Lawrence Kasdan's Body Heat (1981) is aware of the films that inspired it—especially Billy Wilder's Double Indemnity (1944). But it has a power that transcends its sources. It exploits the personal style of its stars to insinuate itself; Kael is unfair to Turner, who in her debut role played a woman so sexually confident that we can believe her lover (William Hurt) could be dazed into doing almost anything for her. The moment we believe that, the movie stops being an exercise and starts working.

John Simon of National Review described Body Heat as "derivative and odious".

In a home video review for Turner Classic Movies, Glenn Erickson called it "arguably the first conscious Neo Noir"; he wrote "Too often described as a quickie remake of Double Indemnity, Body Heat is more detailed in structure and more pessimistic about human nature. The noir hero for the Reagan years is ...more like the self-defeating Al Roberts of Edgar Ulmer's Detour".

The film is recognized by American Film Institute in these lists:

- 2001: AFI's 100 Years...100 Thrills – No. 92
- 2002: AFI's 100 Years...100 Passions – No. 94

Rourke earned critical acclaim for his performance, which helped him evolve from character actor to movie star.

== Home media ==
Warner Home Video released a 25th-anniversary Deluxe Edition DVD of Body Heat, including a documentary about the film by Laurent Bouzereau, a "number of rightfully deleted scenes", and a trailer. It was released by the Criterion Collection on May 19, 2026.
