= Mark Kasdan =

American screenwriter and film producer

- Born: August 29, 1941 (age 84); Hammond, Louisiana, U.S.
- Occupations: Screenwriter; film producer
- Relatives: Lawrence Kasdan (brother); Jake Kasdan (nephew); Jonathan Kasdan (nephew)

Mark Kasdan is an American screenwriter and film producer known for such films as Criminal Law, Silverado, Dreamcatcher, and Horizon: An American Saga.

== Filmography ==
Year	Title	Role	Notes
1985	Silverado	Doc Skinner	Deleted scenes
