= Light & Magic (TV series) =

American television series

- Genre: Docuseries
- Directed by: Lawrence Kasdan (season 1); Joe Johnston (season 2)
- Music by: James Newton Howard (season 1); Micheal Dean Persons (season 2); Xander Rodzinski (season 2)
- Country of origin: United States
- Original language: English
- No. of seasons: 2
- No. of episodes: 9

Production
- Executive producers: Marc Gilbar; Ron Howard; Lawrence Kasdan; Meredith Kaulfers; Kathleen Kennedy; Michelle Rejwan; Justin Wilkes
- Cinematography: Nicola Marsh; Emily Topper
- Editors: Mike Long; Jonah Moran; Anoosh Tertzakian
- Running time: 53–63 minutes
- Production companies: Lucasfilm Ltd.; Imagine Documentaries; Kasdan Pictures

Original release
- Network: Disney+
- Release: July 27, 2022 – April 18, 2025

Light & Magic is an American documentary television series on the history of the motion picture visual effects company Industrial Light & Magic (ILM) from its founding in 1975 to its key role in the development of visual effects in filmmaking. Season 1 was directed by Lawrence Kasdan and produced by Lucasfilm Ltd. and Imagine Documentaries. The series debuted as a Disney+ Original on July 27, 2022, with all six episodes airing at the same time. Season 2 was released on April 18, 2025. It is directed by Joe Johnston.

== Premise ==
The series recounts the history of the motion picture visual effects company Industrial Light & Magic (ILM) from its founding in 1975 to its key role in the development of visual effects in filmmaking.

== Episodes ==
=== Series overview ===
Season	Episodes	Originally released
1	6	July 27, 2022
2	3	April 18, 2025

=== Season 1 (2022) ===
No. overall	No. in season	Title	Directed by	Original release date
1	1	"Gang of Outsiders"	Lawrence Kasdan	July 27, 2022
An unlikely team comes together to create the effects for a new space film called The Star Wars. The episode draws upon interviews with George Lucas and several ILM veterans including John Dykstra, Dennis Muren, Lorne Peterson and Phil Tippett. Notable production set designs covered in the first episode include the creation of the Millennium Falcon, the Death Star tractor beam set and the Yavin Temple celebration scene.
2	2	"On the Bucking Bronco"	Lawrence Kasdan	July 27, 2022
The episode begins with a brief biography of Lucas leading up to production of Star Wars. After several studios decline his script, Lucas starts his own production company called Lucasfilm. Following filming in Tunisia and London, Lucas creates a visual effects team including Dykstra, Tippett, Paul Hirsch and Patricia Rose Duignan. This visual effects team becomes the core of Industrial Light & Magic. The team works on post-production effects including puppets in the Mos Eisley cantina scene, starfighter dogfights, and the Death Star's components. The team bask in the success of Star Wars at the box office, with several receiving awards.
3	3	"Just Think About It"	Lawrence Kasdan	July 27, 2022
Following the completion of Star Wars, George Lucas relocates from Los Angeles to San Francisco, where he embarks on creating the sequel The Empire Strikes Back. Several ILM veterans including Jonathan Erland, Lorne Peterson, Gary Kurtz, Phil Tippett and Ralph McQuarrie relocate to San Francisco. Industrial Light & Magic is established at a renovated warehouse. The ILM team is also joined by several newcomers including Harrison Ellenshaw, Chrissie England and Ed Catmull. The ILM team builds several model sets and matte paintings while experimenting with new computer graphics and optical printing technology capable of mixing several images together. Following production, the ILM team works on several film productions including Raiders of the Lost Ark, Dragonslayer, E.T. the Extra-Terrestrial and Star Trek II: The Wrath of Khan.
4	4	"I Think I Found My People"	Lawrence Kasdan	July 27, 2022
ILM continues working on the visual effects for Return of the Jedi, E.T., Poltergeist, the Indiana Jones franchise, The Goonies, Back to the Future and Cocoon. George Lucas' work culture creates friction with Richard Edlund, who leaves to start his own company. Lucas also recruits new employees including John Knoll and Ben Burtt while developing new technologies including the Pixar Image Computer and EditDroid. Lucas later sells Lucasfilm's computer division, which becomes Pixar.
5	5	"Morfing"	Lawrence Kasdan	July 27, 2022
The episode focuses on ILM's transition towards digital visual effects technology during the late 1980s and early 1990s. ILM experiments with digital technology for several films including Willow, The Abyss, and Terminator 2: Judgement Day. ILM is joined by several new employees including Jean Bolte, Mark A.Z. Dippé, Steve Williams, Ellen Poon and Doug Chiang, who bring their skills and talents to the company. Dippé and Williams spearhead Lucasfilm's transition towards digital effects, which causes discomfort among the modelling and camera departments.
6	6	"No More Pretending You're Dinosaurs"	Lawrence Kasdan	July 27, 2022
The episode beings with ILM working on developing both practical models and CGI animation for the 1992 Jurassic Park film. The CGI dinosaurs revolutionize digital visual effects in Hollywood, leading to cutbacks to the modeling and practical effects departments at ILM. Satisfied that digital effects technology has advanced enough, Lucas embarks on creating the Prequel trilogy, which he envisions as digital films. He pushes the limits of film-making technology. Following the Prequel trilogy, ILM works on Iron Man, The Underground Railroad and The Mandalorian television series.

=== Season 2 (2025) ===
No. overall	No. in season	Title	Directed by	Original release date
7	1	"Are We Ready for This?"	Joe Johnston	April 18, 2025
Following ILM's work on the digital visual effects for Casper and Dragonheart, George Lucas embarks on creating The Phantom Menace. Lucas also hires producer Rick McCallum and Doug Chiang to create the visual effects and concept art for the film. After developing several drafts of Jar Jar Binks through concept art, casting director Robin Gurland recruits Ahmed Best to portray the character. A mixture of life performances, practical and digital effects are used to create Binks, who becomes Lucasfilm's first CGI animated character. Sets and digital imagery are also used to create the film's podracers and Mos Espa racing circuit.
8	2	"There Must Be a Better Way"	Joe Johnston	April 18, 2025
Rob Coleman, George Lucas, Ahmed Best, Rick McCallum and Jim Morris talk about the negative backlash against Jar Jar Binks. Best shares about his struggle with depression and suicide in the aftermath of The Phantom Menace's release. The episode also features interviews with Stefen Fangmeier, Habib Zargarpour, Masi Oka and Polly Ing, who talk about using particle systems to create the tornado in Twister and the waves in The Perfect Storm. ILM then embarks on producing Attack of the Clones using a custom-built Sony digital camera, green and blue screens and new motion capture technology. CGI animation is also used to create a digital Yoda. Lorne Peterson and newcomer Fon Davis are also hired to build some model sets for the Geonosian scenes.
9	3	"There's No Going Back"	Joe Johnston	April 18, 2025
The episode features interviews with John Knoll, Dennis Muren, Gore Verbinski, Hal Hickel, Janet Lewin, Joe Letteri and Bill Nighy. ILM produces the visual effects for Hector Barbossa, the undead pirates and the tentacled Davy Jones from the Pirates of the Caribbean film franchise through the use of motion capture technology, tracking marks and blue screen. The episode also covers ILM's role in the production of Revenge of the Sith, War of the Worlds and Rango. During the 2000s, ILM faces competition from several VFX companies particularly Wētā FX, which recruits Letteri to work on the visual effects for Gollum. The episode also features a 2023 ceremony decommissioning ILM's model workshop at Kerner Boulevard, San Rafael; marking the closing of a chapter in the company's history.

== Release ==
The series premiered on Disney+ on July 27, 2022, with season 2 released on April 18, 2025.

== Reception ==
=== Critical response ===
Review aggregator Rotten Tomatoes reported an approval rating of 100% based on 13 reviews, with an average rating of 8.8/10. The website's critics consensus reads, "Documenting the rise of ILM with comprehensive attention to detail, Light & Magic is a worthy salute to the elbow grease that goes into moviemaking and an absolute treat for fans of cinematic wizardry."

Brian Lowry of CNN stated Lawrence Kasdan manages to depict a thoughtful, entertaining, and detailed look at the creation of special effects across the documentary series, and found it to be an ambitious and deep take on how ILM's special effects can make an impact. Jim Hemphill of IndieWire found that Kasdan succeeds to narrate a broad story dealing with advanced technologies across a personal lens, saying the documentary follows the evolution of Lucasfilm Ltd and its employees in a moving, entertaining, and profound manner.

Stephanie Morgan of Common Sense Media rated the documentary four out of five stars, applauded the educational value, calling the behind-the-scenes fascinating, and praised the depiction of positive messages and role models, citing ingenuity, perseverance, and teamwork, while taking note of the diverse representations. Tara Bennett of IGN rated the series seven out of ten, called George Lucas' creation of Lucasfilm Ltd a compelling story, and stated the company succeeds to depict its impact on the movie industry across Light & Magic, but found the series too condensed, saying the documentary is too short to unfold Lucasfilm Ltd's full story.

=== Accolades ===
James Newton Howard received a nomination for Outstanding Music Composition for a Documentary Series or Special (Original Dramatic Score) for the episode "Gang of Outsiders" at the 75th Primetime Creative Arts Emmy Awards.
