= I Love You to Death =

1990 film by Lawrence Kasdan

- Theatrical release poster
- Directed by: Lawrence Kasdan
- Written by: John Kostmayer
- Produced by: Jeffrey Lurie
- Starring: Kevin Kline; Tracey Ullman; William Hurt; River Phoenix; Joan Plowright; Keanu Reeves
- Cinematography: Owen Roizman
- Edited by: Anne V. Coates
- Music by: James Horner
- Distributed by: Tri-Star Pictures
- Release date: April 6, 1990
- Running time: 97 minutes
- Country: United States
- Languages: English; Italian; Serbo-Croatian
- Box office: $16.2 million

I Love You to Death is a 1990 American black comedy film directed by Lawrence Kasdan and starring an ensemble cast featuring Kevin Kline, Tracey Ullman, Joan Plowright, River Phoenix, William Hurt, and Keanu Reeves.

The screenplay by John Kostmayer is loosely based on an attempted murder that happened in 1983, in Allentown, Pennsylvania, where Frances Toto repeatedly tried to kill her husband, Anthony. She spent four years in prison for attempted murder and was released in 1988. As of 2023, the couple are still married.

== Plot ==
In Tacoma, Washington, Catholic Italian American Joey Boca goes to church, and in the confession booth, admits to a priest to cheating on his wife Rosalie with at least seven women in the past two or three weeks. To the priest's astonishment, Joey has a hard time remembering exactly how many women he cheated with, how many times with each, and exactly when. Despite asking for forgiveness, Joey remains unrepentant in his routine.

Joey and Rosalie, who run a pizza parlor, have been married for years and have two children. They also own an apartment building, managed by Joey, who occasionally rents the apartments to his lovers, providing routine "maintenance services" beyond fixing the plumbing. A young employee at the restaurant, Devo Nod, is in love with the much older Rosalie and tries to convince her to no avail that Joey is cheating on her and she deserves better. Rosalie has unshakable faith in Joey’s fidelity and believes his frequent evening outings are just relaxation, since “he works so hard.” Despite being unaware of Joey's infidelities, Rosalie's Yugoslavian mother, Nadja, dislikes the domineering and demanding Joey. Agreeing with Devo, Nadja dislikes that Joey expects Rosalie to cook, clean, do childcare, and keep serving him on demand, despite Rosalie also working long hours at the pizza parlor.

One day at the library, Rosalie sees Joey kissing one of his lovers among the shelves. Distraught, Rosalie tries to kill herself by overdosing on sleeping pills. However, before she can do so, her sadness turns into anger at Joey. Furious, she enlists the help of her mother to kill Joey.

To their chagrin, Joey proves difficult to kill. First, Nadja hires a masked man to kill him with a baseball bat. Thanks to quick reflexes, Joey escapes unharmed. Next, using her advanced mechanical skills, Nadja tries to blow up Joey's car, but the bomb fails to go off. Later, mother and daughter try to heavily dose Joey’s spaghetti with sleeping pills, but despite eating several large bowls full, he simply gets a stomach cramp and dismisses it as a virus. They decide that nothing short of shooting will kill Joey, but neither Rosalie nor Nadja can bring themselves to pull the trigger. They ask Devo to show his devotion to Rosalie by shooting Joey. The reluctant and nonviolent Devo cannot look at Joey while pulling the trigger, however, and only ends up wounding him behind the ear. Refusing to try again, even for his beloved Rosalie, Devo hires acquaintances of a relative, incompetent and perpetually stoned cousins Harlan and Marlon James. When Marlon's cowardice stops him from being present at the shooting, Harlan shoots Joey through the chest but misses his heart. Joey rises from bed, complaining of a headache and chest pains. As the medical examiner later reports, the sleeping pills have slowed Joey’s metabolism, keeping him from bleeding to death.

Eventually, a convict at the bar where the assassins were hired reveals their plan. When the police arrive, they find the wounded Joey in some pain and unaware that he has been shot and poisoned. He is taken to the hospital, and Rosalie, Nadja, Devo, and the James cousins are arrested. Seeing the error of his ways and at his own mother's behest, Joey refuses to press charges and bails everyone out of jail. A repentant Joey realizes that his cheating has infuriated Rosalie, who cares deeply for him and whom he has underappreciated. While waiting for Rosalie with flowers and a box of chocolates, he meets the James cousins and makes peace. Seeing Rosalie again, he asks her to take him back, but still offended, she runs out. Joey catches her, and in the janitors' closet, they reveal their love with some intimacy, much to Devo's dismay and the surprise of Rosalie's mother.

== Cast ==
- Kevin Kline as Joey Boca
- Tracey Ullman as Rosalie Boca
- Joan Plowright as Nadja
- River Phoenix as Devo Nod
- William Hurt as Harlan James
- Keanu Reeves as Marlon James
- James Gammon as Lieutenant Larry Schooner
- Jack Kehler as Sergeant Carlos Wiley
- Victoria Jackson as Lacey
- Miriam Margolyes as Mrs. Boca
- Alisan Porter as Carla Boca
- Jon Kasdan as Dominic Boca
- Heather Graham as Bridget
- Phoebe Cates as Joey's Disco Girl (uncredited)

== Reception ==
=== Box office ===
The film earned $4 million on its opening weekend and grossed over $16 million in North America.

=== Critical response ===
I Love You to Death received mixed reviews. On Rotten Tomatoes, it has a 58% approval rating based on 26 reviews, with an average score of 5.8/10. On Metacritic, the film has a weighted average score of 45 out of 100 based on reviews from 13 critics, indicating "mixed or average" reviews. Audiences surveyed by CinemaScore gave the film a grade C on scale of A to F.

Jonathan Rosenbaum, writing for the Chicago Reader, described the film as a "fair-to-middling black comedy" and that "although the pacing is sluggish in spots, people with a taste for acting as impersonation will enjoy some of the scenery chewing—especially by Plowright, Kline, and Hurt".

Roger Ebert describes the film as "an actor's dream" but isn't quite so sure it is a dream film for an audience. He praises Ullman for her performance, noting it is all the more effective against the overtly comic performance of Kline. Ebert remarks "William Hurt could have walked through the role of the spaced-out hit man, but takes the time to make the character believable and even, in a bleary way, complex". Ebert suggests Kasdan was attracted to the script because it seems almost impossible to direct, and although he is not sure it succeeds, it is certainly not boring.

=== The Toto Case ===
On the release of I Love You to Death, many news outlets, such as The New York Times, Los Angeles Times, and the Orlando Sentinel, ran stories on the "stranger than fiction" news events on which the comedy is based.

As reported by the Orlando Sentinel on April 24, 1990, "'Like all husbands and wives, they’ve had good times and bad times. What makes them different from most couples is that their bad times made the papers. From coast to coast. And the network news programs. And a host of TV talk shows. And the newsmagazines. And People and Us magazines. And the supermarket tabloids. And, indeed, newspapers and TV throughout the world."^{1990}

As reported by the Chicago Tribune on April 13, 1990: "What got Tony and Frances Toto all this exposure started in 1982 and 1983, when Frances tried to have Tony killed. Five times."

"She almost succeeded. The last time, Tony was shot in the head and chest. While he lay wounded for five days in their bed at home, Frances tried to poison him with chicken soup that was laced with barbiturates."

The Tribune went on to report that what gained the event notoriety and a film is that Tony Toto not only forgave his wife Frances, but tried to convince the District Attorney to not press charges. Toto sold the family business and took a loan on the family house to bail Frances out of jail. At her trial Frances pleaded guilty to two felony charges. Tony pleaded for leniency to the judge and Frances was sentenced to four years, which she served. Tony reasoned that he had driven Frances to murder with his flagrant womanizing and "domineering and insensitive" behavior. Frances realized she had gone too far. Both agreed that counseling would have been a better route than paid assassins. They decided to work on their marriage and stayed together.

Asked about the appropriateness of a comedy based on the serious events, Tony laughed. He said everyone needs a sense of humor to overcome the kind of ordeal he and Frances went through. "Being able to laugh—that's what kept me going," Tony said. "The movie is perfect to me because it's told in a funny way. That's the only way I could express my feelings when somebody asked me what happened."

As reported in the Orlando Sentinel, "The Totos are pleased with the movie. Tony described it as '99 percent' accurate." Among the inaccuracies, according to Tony, are that the sleeping pills were put into chicken soup instead of spaghetti, Frances's mother was not involved in the plot, and Tony did not pay bail for Frances's accomplices. "Audiences may think Hollywood took even more liberties because the true story is so bizarre. The parts about the baseball bat and the car bomb and the two bullets really happened," Tony said.
