= Criminal Law (film) =

1988 film by Martin Campbell

- Directed by: Martin Campbell
- Written by: Mark Kasdan
- Produced by: Hilary Heath; Robert MacLean
- Starring: Gary Oldman; Kevin Bacon; Tess Harper; Karen Young; Joe Don Baker
- Cinematography: Phil Méheux
- Music by: Jerry Goldsmith
- Distributed by: Hemdale Film Corporation
- Release dates: September 15, 1988 (TIFF); November 11, 1988 (Limited); April 28, 1989 (United States)
- Running time: 117 minutes
- Country: United States
- Language: English
- Budget: $5 million
- Box office: $9,974,446

Criminal Law is a 1988 American legal thriller film directed by Martin Campbell and starring Gary Oldman and Kevin Bacon. It received generally negative reviews.

== Plot ==
Ben Chase is a brash young defense attorney whose success is built on his willingness to manipulate the judicial system for the benefit of his clients. In spite of his career success as an attorney, Ben is starting to show signs of serious alcoholism. When he successfully defends Martin Thiel, the scion of a wealthy, prominent family, against a murder charge, the game turns on him.

Martin lures Ben to the scene of another murder and retains Ben to defend him, even before he is charged. Knowing his client is guilty, Ben struggles at last with the reality of his ethics, until he resolves to oppose Martin secretly, hoping he will incriminate himself.

As Martin's ultimate plan unfolds, both he and Ben will be forced to reexamine everything they hold to be true.

== Cast ==
- Gary Oldman as Ben Chase
- Kevin Bacon as Martin Thiel
- Tess Harper as Lt. Detective Jean Stillwell
- Karen Young as Ellen Falkner
- Joe Don Baker as Detective Carl Mesel
- Sean McCann as Jacob Fischer
- Ron Lea as Gary Hull
- Michael Sinelnikoff as Professor Clemens
- Elizabeth Shepherd as Dr. Sybil Thiel

== Reception ==
Roger Ebert wrote: "Criminal Law is a textbook example of a movie going wrong before our very eyes, because of the curious failure of the filmmakers to realize that you can toy with an audience only so long before the audience grows resentful... It's a shame such good performances were lost by the runaway use of gimmicks."

Variety commended the work of Oldman and Bacon, but criticized the story's "ill-defined pretensions as an essay on the American legal system and a herky-jerky continuity that's fatiguing instead of tingling".

Kevin Thomas felt that Criminal Law "proceeds from one weakness to another", but described Oldman as "electrifying".

Peter Travers felt Oldman's performance was compromised by an unfocused Boston accent, falling short of his typical "powerhouse" acting standards. Travers had additional criticism for the film's "overwrought script" and lack of logic and subtlety.

Slightly more favorable was Linda Rasmussen of AllMovie, who wrote that Oldman "gives an excellent performance", described Bacon as "intriguing and ambiguous", and praised the direction and action sequences. She concluded: "Criminal Law, if not taken very seriously and with more than a grain of salt, can be entertaining, but it fails miserably when compared to accurate, exciting legal thrillers such as Primal Fear.

On Rotten Tomatoes the film has an approval rating of 30% based on reviews from 10 critics, with an average score of 4.4/10.
