= The Risk Pool =

1988 novel by Richard Russo

- First edition cover
- Author: Richard Russo
- Language: English
- Genre: Bildungsroman
- Publisher: Random House (hardcover) Vintage (paperback)
- Publication date: September 12, 1988
- Publication place: United States
- Media type: Print (Hardcover, Trade paperback)
- Pages: 479
- ISBN: 0-394-56527-4 (hardcover 1st edition)
- OCLC: 17803510
- Dewey Decimal: 813/.54 19
- LC Class: PS3568.U812 R57 1988

The Risk Pool is a 1988 novel by American author Richard Russo. It is a Bildungsroman or "coming of age" novel set in fictional Mohawk, New York, a dying blue-collar town. The Risk Pool was well received by critics, such as The New York Times, which called it a "superbly original, maliciously funny book" and praised Russo's "brilliant, deadpan writing." In 2004, Warner Bros. Pictures was reported to be developing a movie based on the book, with Tom Hanks starring as Ned Hall's father and Lawrence Kasdan writing the script and directing.

== Plot introduction ==
The plot follows narrator Ned Hall through four periods of his life, focusing specifically on Hall's relationship with his loutish and, in his best friend's words, "rockheaded" father.

== Influences ==
Many important elements of The Risk Pool were based on the author's own experience growing up in Gloversville, New York, a town similar to Russo's fictional Mohawk. Like Mohawk, Gloversville's economy revolves around the leather industry, and both towns suffered economic decline in the second half of the twentieth century. In a 1993 interview with The San Francisco Chronicle, Russo revealed that his own father had exhibited many of the same characteristics as Sam Hall. Russo's father "lived a life of studied bad habits," leaving his wife and ignoring his son until he was "old enough to follow him into the OTB and then into the bar and then into the pool hall." In The Risk Pool, Sam Hall interacts with his son Ned at an earlier age, but much of their time together is spent in bars, pool halls, and gambling establishments. Some of Ned's life experiences mirror the author's. Both left upstate New York to attend college in the Southwest United States, but while Ned abandoned his PhD program, Russo completed his dissertation about an early American writer in 1979.

== Release details ==
- 1988, United States, Random House ISBN 0-394-56527-4, Pub date 1988-09-12, Hardcover 1st Edition
- 1994, United States, Vintage ISBN 0-679-75383-4 Pub date May, 1994, Vintage Contemporaries Trade paperback edition

== Reviews ==
- Kakutani, Michiko (November 2, 1988). "Books of the Times; Growing Up 'Pretty Near the Edge'". The New York Times.
- Sullivan, Jack (December 18, 1988). "'Things Get Bad,' Says Dad'". The New York Times.
