= The TV Set =

- Theatrical release poster
- Directed by: Jake Kasdan
- Written by: Jake Kasdan
- Produced by: Jake Kasdan; Aaron Ryder
- Starring: David Duchovny; Sigourney Weaver; Ioan Gruffudd; Judy Greer; Fran Kranz; Lindsay Sloane; Lucy Davis
- Cinematography: Uta Briesewitz
- Edited by: Tara Timpone
- Music by: Michael Andrews
- Distributed by: THINKFilm
- Release dates: April 28, 2006 (Tribeca); April 6, 2007 (United States)
- Running time: 88 minutes
- Country: United States
- Language: English
- Budget: $2 million
- Box office: $265,198

The TV Set is a 2006 American comedy-drama film written and directed by Jake Kasdan and starring David Duchovny, Sigourney Weaver, Ioan Gruffudd, and Judy Greer. The film follows an idealistic writer attempting to bring his vision for a TV show to fruition on the small screen.

== Plot ==
Idealistic screenwriter Mike Klein (Duchovny) tries to navigate his TV pilot through the mine-laden path of casting, production, and the madness of prime-time scheduling—all while trying to stay true to his vision. Along the way, he has to juggle the agendas of headstrong network president Lenny (Weaver), volatile young stars, his pregnant wife Natalie (Bateman), and an ever-optimistic personal manager Alice (Greer), while suffering serious back pain.

== Cast ==
- David Duchovny as Mike Klein
- Sigourney Weaver as Lenny
- Ioan Gruffudd as Richard McCallister
- Judy Greer as Alice
- Fran Kranz as Zach Harper
- Lindsay Sloane as Laurel Simon
- Justine Bateman as Natalie Klein
- Lucy Davis as Chloe McCallister
- Philip Rosenthal as Cooper
- Matt Price as Berg
- Willie Garson as Brian
- M. C. Gainey as Hutch
- Simon Helberg as TJ Goldman
- Kaitlin Doubleday as Jesse Filmore
- Andrea Martin as Becky
- Philip Baker Hall as Vernon Maxwell
- Allison Scagliotti as Bethany
- Jonathan Silverman as himself (cameo)
- Seth Green as himself, Slut Wars Host (uncredited)
- Don Hany as Guy

== Production and vision ==
The film's writer/director Jake Kasdan had originally intended Ben Stiller for the role of Lenny. However, Kasdan cast Weaver for the role, which changed his idea of what the character should be. Kasdan does not regard the film as satire, as he sees nothing exaggerated in its depiction of bringing a pilot to production.

== Release ==
The film was first screened on the Tribeca Film Festival on April 28, 2006. Following almost a year of festival screenings, it was released in cinemas on April 6, 2007. A DVD edition was released through 20th Century Fox on September 25, 2007. It features commentary tracks, a "making of" featurette, and a deleted scene.

== Reception ==
On the review aggregator website Rotten Tomatoes, the film has an approval rating of 64%, based on 75 reviews. The website's critics consensus reads: "Offering both broad and insider jokes, The TV Set is a sharp satire that will please both the average moviegoers and pop culture aficionados."

== See also ==
- The Big Picture, a film following a similar theme
- Episodes, a TV series following a similar theme
- State and Main, an award-winning comedy film about an obstacle-fraught film production
