= In the Land of Women =

- Theatrical release poster
- Directed by: Jonathan Kasdan
- Written by: Jonathan Kasdan
- Produced by: Steve Golin; David Kanter; Barbara Kelly
- Starring: Adam Brody; Kristen Stewart; Meg Ryan; Olympia Dukakis; Makenzie Vega
- Cinematography: Paul Cameron
- Edited by: Carol Littleton; Marty Levenstein
- Music by: Stephen Trask
- Production companies: Castle Rock Entertainment; Anonymous Content
- Distributed by: Warner Bros. Pictures
- Release date: April 20, 2007
- Running time: 98 minutes
- Country: United States
- Language: English
- Budget: $10 million
- Box office: $17.6 million

In the Land of Women is a 2007 American romantic comedy-drama film directed and written by Jonathan Kasdan and stars Adam Brody, Kristen Stewart and Meg Ryan. The film premiered in the United States on April 20, 2007.

== Plot ==
Young soft-core porn screenwriter Carter Webb lives in Los Angeles. His young starlet girlfriend Sofia breaks up with him.

Carter later becomes his supposedly dying grandmother's caregiver in Michigan, partly to try to heal and also to write.

Upon arrival, Grandma Phyllis does not initially recognize him, and he sees she needs help. She has not been eating properly nor keeping her home tidy. After a few phone calls with his mother and his boss, Carter begins to clean up the house.

Across the street, Paige and Lucy return home from school. Their mother Sarah calls Lucy to the kitchen and tells her she has found a lump in her breast. A shocked Lucy wants to accompany her mother to get the results, but Sarah refuses.

Lucy watches Carter take out the trash, snickers when he accidentally drops a bag, but avoids him before he can speak to her. Sarah then approaches with the family dog and introduces herself. They talk before Lucy's friends arrive, and Sarah goes back inside. Lucy and Carter meet, and she asks Carter not to tell her parents that she smokes.

The next morning, Sarah arrives at Carter's doorstep, bringing cookies and inviting him to walk the dog. They chat about their lives. Carter mentions Sofia, wondering about his love for her. He believes that the love letters he has written for Sofia contain his best work.

Returning home, Sarah asks Lucy to invite Carter out to take his mind off Sofia, but she refuses, and her husband agrees. Sarah leaves the room frustrated, going to her bathroom to take painkillers.

The next day, while on a run, Carter remembers the time he had with Sofia: from their first kiss to their breakup. Distracted, he runs into a tree and passes out. When he wakes up, Lucy is standing over him. She gives him a ride home and then invites him to a movie. Carter tells her to ask her parents' permission to take him out on a school night, as they normally would not. Lucy agrees and goes back inside.

Shortly thereafter, Sarah invites Carter for another walk. This time she leads him to a patch of forest. She admits that her husband is having an affair and that she does not love him – at least not the way Carter loved Sofia. They hug and leave to run errands together.

Carter goes with Lucy and Paige to the mall to see a movie. While there, they see adverts portraying Sofia in one of the shops windows, and Paige, a fan of hers, remarks Sofia is now dating Colin Farrell, upsetting Carter. They also awkwardly run into Eric, a schoolmate of Lucy, who works at the Orange Julius shop.

Afterward, Lucy takes Carter to her high school football field because he earlier expressed curiosity about the typical high school experience, as he attended an exclusive private high school. There, she confesses to be sort of dating the high school quarterback Gabe, who is quite arrogant. However, they have not kissed yet. Meanwhile, Gabe's best friend Eric is the opposite of Gabe; soft and shy. Lucy reveals she knows her father is having an affair, but believes her mother does not know.

Four days later, outside in a pouring rain, Sarah, in tears, tells Carter she has breast cancer, and will have a mastectomy the following morning. Carter promises her "you're going to be alright", and they passionately kiss.

Days later, Lucy convinces Carter to come to a party with her for support after discovering that Gabe hooked up with her best friend. During the party, Gabe punches Carter, but then Eric steps in, telling everyone at the party that Gabe is the one who screwed up, and how amazing Lucy is. After the party, Lucy tells Carter about an embarrassing incident she had, at age 11, with a neighborhood boy - sex play - resulting in Lucy's distrust of her mother, not being supportive and understanding. Carter tells Lucy that sex-play is normal, that it wasn't her fault, that life if tough, and her mother loves her. Lucy kisses him. Sarah sees this, and the next day, when Carter visits to see how Sarah is, she tells him to leave Lucy alone and to never speak to them again. He leaves, after leaving an envelope addressed to her on the hallway table.

Five days later, Lucy goes to see Carter, who tells her he is not the guy for her and if she thought about it, she would realize who is. Sarah gets her cancer treatments and finds out that everything will be alright. Sarah and Lucy talk and start to heal their relationship. Sarah reads Carter's letter which, though similar to a love letter, is more of a "thank you" note. While driving home from the hospital, Lucy goes to the mall to see Eric upon realizing he is the guy.

A day or two later, Carter finds his grandmother, sitting in front of the TV, has died. He goes outside for some air and sees Sarah. She apologizes, and they manage to end their relationship on good terms.

He returns to Los Angeles. Later, sitting in the diner where Sofia broke up with him, he's on his laptop computer, trying to finish a script about his grandmother. Conversing with Janey, a friendly waitress, he asks her to read it. She agrees to, but tells him she's a tough critic.

== Cast ==
- Adam Brody as Carter Webb
- Kristen Stewart as Lucy Hardwicke, Carter's love interest
- Meg Ryan as Sarah Hardwicke, Lucy's mother
- Olympia Dukakis as Phyllis, Carter's maternal grandmother
- Makenzie Vega as Paige Hardwicke, Lucy's younger sister
- Elena Anaya as Sofia Buñuel, Carter's girlfriend
- Clark Gregg as Nelson Hardwicke, Lucy's father
- JoBeth Williams as Agnes Webb, Carter's mother
- Dustin Milligan as Eric Watts, Carter's friend
- Ginnifer Goodwin as Janey
- Adrian Hough as Dr. Whitman
- Brenda James as Iris
- Rob Reinis as Avi
- Elise Gatien as Tiffany
- Danielle Savre as Hayley Duncan
- Christine Danielle Connolly as Tanya
- Graham Wardle as Gabe Foley
- Jeff Cunningham as Howard Portchnik
- Ilyse Mimoun as Nelson's assistant
- Karin Konoval as Dr. Ida Rosen

== Production ==
"In the Land of Women is based on Kasdan's experiences."

Some filming occurred on Vancouver Island, British Columbia, Canada, including Hatley Park.

An earlier edit had an "R" rating while the final cut is PG-13.

== Reception ==
=== Commercial ===
The film was released on April 20, 2007, in the United States and grossed US$4.7 million in 2,155 theaters in its opening weekend, coming in eighth at the U.S. box office. The film stayed in theaters for 10 weeks and went on to gross $11 million in the U.S., with a combined worldwide gross of $17.5 million. The gross exceeded the film's $10 million budget, making it a moderate box office success.

=== Critical ===
The film received mixed reviews.

The Associated Press, in The Hollywood Reporter, wrote "Empty...it seems a lot like something women could find at home on the WE channel". Common Sense Media wrote "Touching-but-treacly chick flick for moms and teens".

"Blabby films with blabby women are nothing new, but usually they blab to each other: cheep-cheep-cheep, talk a lot, pick a little more. In his debut feature as writer-director, Jon Kasdan breaks that gender barrier. He imagines them blabbing to a man." — Amy Biancolli, Houston Chronicle

As of September 2007 on the review aggregator Rotten Tomatoes, 43% of critics gave the film positive reviews, based on 116 reviews. The critical consensus states, "While pleasantly acted, In the Land of Women is a dramatically stilted film with underdeveloped characters". On Metacritic, the film had an average score of 47 out of 100 based on 29 reviews.
