= Grand Canyon (1991 film) =

Film by Lawrence Kasdan

- Theatrical release poster
- Directed by: Lawrence Kasdan
- Written by: Lawrence Kasdan; Meg Kasdan
- Produced by: Michael Grillo; Lawrence Kasdan; Charles Okun
- Starring: Danny Glover; Kevin Kline; Steve Martin; Mary McDonnell; Mary-Louise Parker; Alfre Woodard
- Cinematography: Owen Roizman
- Edited by: Carol Littleton
- Music by: James Newton Howard
- Distributed by: 20th Century Fox
- Release date: December 25, 1991
- Running time: 137 minutes
- Country: United States
- Language: English
- Box office: $41 million

Grand Canyon is a 1991 American drama film directed and produced by Lawrence Kasdan, and written by Kasdan with his wife Meg. Featuring an ensemble cast, the film is about random events affecting a diverse group of people, exploring the race- and class-imposed chasms which separate members of the same community.

The film was produced and distributed by 20th Century Fox and was released on December 25, 1991. Grand Canyon was advertised as "The Big Chill for the '90s", in reference to an earlier Kasdan film.

== Plot ==
After attending a Lakers basketball game, an immigration lawyer named Mack finds himself at the mercy of potential muggers when his car breaks down in a bad part of Los Angeles late at night. The muggers are talked out of their plans by Simon, a tow truck driver who arrives just in time. Mack sets out to befriend Simon, despite their having nothing in common.

In the meantime, Mack's wife Claire and his best friend Davis, a producer of violent action films, are experiencing life-changing events. Claire encounters an abandoned baby while jogging and becomes determined to adopt her while Davis faces a philosophical fork in the road after being the victim of violence. Other issues include uncertainty in Mack and Claire's marriage, Mack's secretary dealing with his lack of sensitivity regarding their former affair, and his effort to help a coworker save her kids from gang violence.

Beneath it all lies the search for perspective amidst all the challenges and the need to know that things will probably work out.

== Cast ==
- Danny Glover as Simon
- Kevin Kline as Mack
- Steve Martin as Davis
- Mary McDonnell as Claire
- Mary-Louise Parker as Dee
- Alfre Woodard as Jane
- Jeremy Sisto as Roberto
- Tina Lifford as Deborah
- Patrick Malone as Otis
- Randle Mell as The Alley Baron
- Sarah Trigger as Vanessa
- Destinee DeWalt as Kelley

== Production ==
Writer-director Lawrence Kasdan explained, "Part of what Grand Canyon is about is that we have accepted the fact that our city is not our own. That for people from South Central, for them to go into Beverly Hills and West L.A., the police are on the lookout. They feel unwelcome, are under threat. And vice-versa. Our cities have become these little armed camps."

Filming began on March 11, 1991 in Los Angeles and wrapped on July 3 in Arizona. Parts of the film were shot at Glen Canyon in Utah as well as Canoga Park, California and the Grand Canyon in Arizona.

The footage of the Los Angeles Lakers game in the film was shot before anybody knew Lakers guard Earvin "Magic" Johnson was HIV+. Rita Kempley, in her film review in The Washington Post, pointed to this scene as proof that "... the filmmaker and his team ha[d] truly caught society on the verge."

The character Davis is based on action film producer Joel Silver.

== Soundtrack ==
Grand Canyon: Music From the Original Motion Picture Soundtrack was released in 1992 on Milan Records. In 2013 a remastered and expanded edition was released on La-La Land Records. This version does not contain Warren Zevon's "Searching for a Heart."

Grand Canyon: Music from the Motion Picture Soundtrack

Soundtrack album by James Newton Howard
- Released: 1992
- Recorded: 1990–1991
- Genres: Instrumental pop, pop rock, soft rock, jazz, orchestra
- Length: 42:53 (original) 67:44 (2013 expansion)
- Labels: Milan, RCA, BMG, La-La Land Records (expansion)
- Producers: James Newton Howard, Waddy Wachtel

=== Track listing ===
No.	Title	Length
1.	"Main Titles"	3:36
2.	"Claire Returns the Baby"	1:12
3.	"My Sister Lives Around Here/Those Rocks"	1:59
4.	"Bloodstain"	2:06
5.	"The Baby"	2:48
6.	"Don't Work Late"	0:52
7.	"Mack's Flashback"	1:22
8.	"Don't Want Out"	6:45
9.	"Searching for a Heart"	4:17
10.	"Mack and Claire's Dream"	5:28
11.	"Dee in Brentwood"	0:48
12.	"Otis Runs"	3:54
13.	"You White?"	1:27
14.	"Keep the Baby"	1:30
15.	"Doesn't Matter"	0:45
16.	"Grand Canyon Fanfare/End Titles"	4:11
Total length:		42:53

=== Personnel ===
- James Newton Howard: Piano, Keyboards, Synthesized Bass, Synthesizer Programming, Programming, Orchestration
- Dean Parks, Michael Landau, Jude Cole, Davey Johnstone: Guitars
- Michael Boddicker: Programming, Synthesizer, Synthesizer Programming
- Simon Franglen: Synclavier Programming
- John "J.R." Robinson: Drums
- Neil Stubenhaus: Bass Guitar
- Chuck Domanico: Acoustic Bass
- Michael Lang: Piano
- Joe Porcaro, Emil Richards, Donald Williams, Mike Fisher: Percussions
- Kirk Whalum, Larry Williams: Saxophones
- Paul Salamunovich: Choir Director, Choir Master
- Warren Zevon: Performer (track 9)
- Grand Canyon Fanfare Orchestra: Performer (track 16)
- Chris Boardman, Brad Dechter: Orchestrations
- Marty Paich: Conductor
- Tommy Johnson, Jim Self: Tubas
- Rick Baptist, Charlie Davis, Gary Grant, Mario Guarneri, Jerry Hey, John Richard Lewis, Jon Lewis, Warren Luening, Malcolm McNabb: Trumpets
- Gayle Levant: Harp
- Charles Loper, Bill Reichenbach Jr., George Thatcher: Trombones
- David Duke, Joe Meyer, Brian O'Connor, John A. Reynolds, James Thatcher, Richard Todd: French Horns

== Reception ==
=== Box office ===
Grand Canyon earned $40.9 million worldwide.

=== Critical response ===
Grand Canyon received generally positive reviews from critics; it has a 7/10 "fresh" rating at Rotten Tomatoes and a critical rating of 79% based on 38 reviews. Janet Maslin of The New York Times wrote,

Set in Los Angeles, and gliding gracefully among a representative set of characters, the film means to move through different economic strata, age groups and racial backgrounds in its search for common experience. If the ambition to do this is ultimately more impressive than the hazy, unfocused outcome, Mr. Kasdan still deserves a lot of credit for what he has tried.

Washington Post critic Rita Kempley wrote,

Grand Canyon considers the ever-widening chasms that divide us, the shifting demographic fault lines that have set society quaking like the needle on Richter's scale. ... This City of the Angels captured by Kasdan, its skies buzzing with helicopters, reminds us most of all of Vietnam. But this is not war, it's suicide, America in the latent stages of self-inflicted apocalypse. Kasdan validates our fears, but he doesn't strip us of all hope, for the central image also promises something greater than ourselves. The view from the edge can be awesome.

Owen Gleiberman of Entertainment Weekly chided the film for its "... solemn zeitgeist chic," and called it "... way too self-conscious," but ultimately decided that "Grand Canyon is finally a very classy soap opera, one that holds a generous mirror up to its audience's anxieties. It's the sort of movie that says: Life is worth living. After a couple of hours spent with characters this enjoyable, the message—in all its forthright sentimentality—feels earned."

Film critic Roger Ebert gave the film four out of four stars, and wrote, "In a time when our cities are wounded, movies like Grand Canyon can help to heal." Ebert's television reviewing partner Gene Siskel also loved the film, with Ebert placing it at the #4 and Siskel at #6 on their 1991 top ten lists.

=== Accolades ===
Award	Category	Nominee(s)	Result	Ref.
Academy Awards	Best Screenplay – Written Directly for the Screen	Lawrence Kasdan and Meg Kasdan	Nominated	
Berlin International Film Festival	Golden Bear	Lawrence Kasdan	Won	
Dallas–Fort Worth Film Critics Association Awards	Best Film		Nominated	
Golden Globe Awards	Best Screenplay	Lawrence Kasdan and Meg Kasdan	Nominated	
NAACP Image Awards	Outstanding Motion Picture		Nominated	
National Board of Review Awards	Top Ten Films		3rd Place	
Political Film Society Awards	Peace		Won	
Turkish Film Critics Association Awards	Best Foreign Film		5th Place	
Writers Guild of America Awards	Best Screenplay – Written Directly for the Screen	Lawrence Kasdan and Meg Kasdan	Nominated	

== Legacy ==
Phil Collins' 1993 song "Both Sides of the Story" references the scene from Grand Canyon where the young mugger tells Simon (played by Danny Glover) that he carries a gun to make sure people respect (and fear) him.

== See also ==
- List of films featuring the deaf and hard of hearing
