= Silverado (film) =

1985 film by Lawrence Kasdan

- Theatrical release poster by Bob Peak
- Directed by: Lawrence Kasdan
- Written by: Lawrence Kasdan; Mark Kasdan
- Produced by: Lawrence Kasdan
- Starring: Kevin Kline; Scott Glenn; Rosanna Arquette; John Cleese; Kevin Costner; Brian Dennehy; Danny Glover; Jeff Goldblum; Linda Hunt
- Cinematography: John Bailey
- Edited by: Carol Littleton
- Music by: Bruce Broughton
- Production company: Delphi III Productions
- Distributed by: Columbia Pictures
- Release date: July 10, 1985
- Running time: 133 minutes
- Country: United States
- Language: English
- Budget: $23 million
- Box office: $32,192,570

Silverado is a 1985 American Western film that was produced and directed by Lawrence Kasdan and written by Kasdan and his brother Mark. It stars Kevin Kline, Scott Glenn, Danny Glover, and Kevin Costner. The supporting cast features Brian Dennehy, Rosanna Arquette, John Cleese, Jeff Goldblum, Lynne Whitfield, and Linda Hunt.

The film was produced by Columbia Pictures and Delphi III Productions and distributed to theatres by Columbia and by Sony Pictures Home Entertainment for home media. The original soundtrack, with a score composed by Bruce Broughton, was released by Geffen Records. On November 12, 2005, an expanded two-disc version of the score was released by the Intrada Records label.

Silverado premiered in the United States on July 10, 1985. Through an 11-week run, the film was shown at 1,190 theaters at its widest release, and grossed $32,192,570 at the box office. Generally met with positive critical reviews, it was nominated for Best Sound and Best Original Score at the 58th Academy Awards.

== Plot ==
Three armed men ambush Emmett as he sleeps in an isolated shack. He kills them and takes one of their horses, then sets off for the town of Turley to meet his brother, Jake, intending to visit their sister Kate in Silverado before continuing on to California.

En route, Emmett rescues Paden, lying in the desert clad only in his long johns underwear, after being robbed and left to die. He lends Paden the spare horse and they arrive at a cavalry outpost, where Paden spots the man who stole his horse. He hurriedly buys a gun with money Emmett lends him. The thief shoots first, but Paden kills him. Paden runs into Cobb, a former criminal associate, who lends him money for new clothes and offers him a job, though Paden declines.

In Turley, Emmett and Paden encounter a wagon train of settlers with a large money box. They witness a Black cowboy, Mal, fight off several attackers and a racist saloon owner. They defend Mal's actions to Sheriff John Langston, who orders Mal to leave town. Learning that Jake is to be hanged for murder the next day, Emmett intends to break him out of jail, but Paden declines to get involved. At the saloon, Paden kills the other man who robbed him to reclaim his hat and gun. Langston arrests Paden and puts him in Jake's cell.

The next morning, Emmett sets fire to the gallows as a diversion, while Jake and Paden break out of jail. They escape town, aided by Mal, a crack shot, who forces Langston's posse to abandon their pursuit. The four men encounter the settlers, whose money box has been stolen. After finding the hideout and recovering the money, they escort the wagon train to their destination near Silverado. Paden and Emmett each take an interest in Hannah, whose husband was killed, while Mal departs for his parents' farm.

Emmett and Jake reunite with Kate, her husband J.T., and their son Augie. It is revealed that Emmett spent five years in prison for killing a rancher over a land rights feud. Mal finds his now-widowed father, Ezra, whose farm was burned down by McKendrick – the son of the rancher Emmett killed – who seized the land. Reaching Silverado, Paden visits the saloon and befriends the manager, Stella. Cobb, the saloon's owner and Silverado's sheriff, hires Paden as his new pit boss.

McKendrick's men murder Ezra, and Mal learns his estranged sister, Rae, is the mistress of gambler "Slick" Stanhope. Emmett realizes the gunmen who ambushed him were sent by McKendrick, who enlists Cobb to kill Emmett and Jake. Mal saves a badly injured Emmett from Cobb's deputies but is betrayed by Slick and captured by Cobb. Kidnapping Jake and Augie, McKendrick's men burn J.T.'s land office. Cobb threatens Stella to keep Paden from intervening, but she urges him to take action, and Rae is wounded breaking her brother out of jail.

Emmett, Mal, and Paden attack McKendrick's ranch, causing a stampede and killing most of his men. Emmett rescues Augie as Jake joins the fight, while McKendrick flees into town. The four compatriots split up. Jake guns down Cobb's right-hand man Tyree; Mal rescues Rae from Slick, killing him with his own knife; Emmett deals with the remaining corrupt deputies and fatally strikes McKendrick with his horse; and Paden shoots Cobb dead in a duel, witnessed by a grateful Stella.

Bidding everyone goodbye, a reconciled Mal and Rae depart to rebuild their family's homestead, as Emmett and Jake finally head for California, and Paden becomes the new sheriff of Silverado.

== Cast ==
- Kevin Kline as Paden
- Scott Glenn as Emmett
- Rosanna Arquette as Hannah
- John Cleese as Sheriff Langston
- Kevin Costner as Jake
- Brian Dennehy as Cobb
- Danny Glover as Mal
- Jeff Goldblum as Calvin "Slick" Stanhope
- Linda Hunt as Stella
- Ray Baker as Ethan McKendrick
- Joe Seneca as Ezra
- Lynn Whitfield as Rae
- Jeff Fahey as Tyree
- Pepe Serna as Scruffy
- Patricia Gaul as Kate
- Amanda Wyss as Phoebe
- Earl Hindman as J.T.
- James Gammon as Dawson
- Jim Haynie as Bradley
- Thomas Wilson Brown as Augie (credited as Tom Brown)
- Brion James as Hobart (uncredited)

== Production ==
The film was shot primarily on location at the Cook Ranch in New Mexico. In 1984, Lawrence and Mark Kasdan and crew were out scouting a remote area of New Mexico by helicopter, hoping to find the most suitable place to build the town of Silverado. The location manager appeared at the property of locals Bill and Marian Cook. At that time, they wanted to build only two or three structures, offering Cook a "casual number" as a location fee. "There wasn't any great motivation for me one way or another, but I said okay. It just grew from that into a big-budget movie and the Silverado set was built", Cook recalled.

In an interview with Trailer Addict, actor Scott Glenn related how casting profoundly influences directing. In reference to different actors working together, he mentioned how he "really liked" Kevin Costner and how he thought Kevin was "easy and comfortable" to be around. He said, "There is real magic going on with that performance." Glenn spent his time joking around, with Costner addressing him by saying, "hey movie star!" during that earlier stage in his career.

== Reception ==
=== Critical response ===
Silverado is the work of Lawrence Kasdan, the man who wrote Raiders of the Lost Ark, and it has some of the same reckless brilliance about it.

— Roger Ebert, writing in the Chicago Sun-Times

Among mainstream critics in the U.S., the film received mostly positive reviews. Rotten Tomatoes gives the film a score of 78% based on reviews from 36 critics, with an average score of 6.8/10. The consensus reads: "Boasting rich detail and a well-told story, Silverado is a rare example of an '80s Hollywood Western done right." On Metacritic, it has a weighted average score of 64% based on 14 reviews.

Critic Janet Maslin, writing in The New York Times, said of director Kasdan that "he creates the film's most satisfying moments by communicating his own sheer enjoyment in revitalizing scenes and images that are so well-loved." Impressed, she exclaimed: "Silverado is a sweeping, glorious-looking Western that's at least a full generation removed from the classic films it brings to mind." Roger Ebert in the Chicago Sun-Times called it "sophisticated", while remarking: "This is a story, you will agree, that has been told before. What distinguishes Kasdan's telling of it is the style and energy he brings to the project." In the San Francisco Chronicle, Peter Stack wrote that the film "delivers elaborate gun-fighting scenes, legions of galloping horses, stampeding cattle, a box canyon, covered wagons, tons of creaking leather, and even a High Noonish duel." He mused: "How it manages to run the gamut of cowboy movie elements without getting smart-alecky is intriguing." In a mixed review, Gene Siskel of the Chicago Tribune, said that the film was "a completely successful physical attempt at reviving the Western, but its script would need a complete rewrite for it to become more than just a small step in a full-scale Western revival." Jay Carr of The Boston Globe noted that Silverado "plays like a big-budget regurgitation of old Westerns. What keeps it going is the generosity that flows between Kasdan and his actors. It's got benevolent energies, but not the more primal kind needed to renew the standard Western images and archetypes." Giving Silverado four out of five stars, author Ian Freer of Empire, thought the film was the "kind of picture that makes you want to play cowboys the moment it is over." He exclaimed, "Whereas many of the westerns from the '70s try a revisionist take on the genre, Silverado offers a wholehearted embracing of western traditions."

The staff at Variety reserved praise for the film, stating that the real rewards of the picture lie in its "visuals", and saying that "rarely has the West appeared so alive, yet unlike what one carries in his mind's eye. Ida Random's production design is thoroughly convincing in detail." Julie Salamon writing for The Wall Street Journal, voiced positive sentiment joyfully, exclaiming that Silverado "looks great and moves fast. Mr. Kasdan has packed his action well against the fearsomely long, dusty stretches of Western plain." Describing some pitfalls, David Sterritt of The Christian Science Monitor said: "When pure storytelling takes over after an hour or so, the picture becomes less original and engaging." Sterritt was quick to admit that "the cinematography by John Bailey is stunning," but he frustratingly noted that "like the last movie Lawrence Kasdan gave us, The Big Chill, it's best when the carefully chosen cast throws itself into developing characters and building their relationships." Total Film viewed Silverado as a creation of the "Kasdan brothers' ebullient love letter to the horse operas of their youth", while throwing in "every Western cliché imaginable. It's not as rousing as it thinks, despite the efforts of Bruce Broughton's strident score, but looks terrific - all big skies and wide-open spaces."

In an entirely negative critique, film critic Jay Scott of The Globe and Mail said the all-too-familiar "manipulative Star Wars-style score is the only novelty on tap in Silverado, which has a plot too drearily complicated and arid to summarize". Dave Kehr of the Chicago Reader, commenting on director Kasdan's style, said that his "considerable skills as a plot carpenter seem to desert him as soon as the story moves to the town of the title." As far as the supporting cast was concerned, he dryly noted, "none of them assumes enough authority to carry the moral and dramatic center of the film." Sheila Benson, writing for the Los Angeles Times gave the film a negative review: "For all its mosaic of nice details, Silverado is still a faintly hollow creation-constructed, not torn from the heart." Richard Corliss of Time didn't find the picture to be compelling, stating how the film "sprays the buckshot of its four or five story lines across the screen with the abandon of a drunken galoot aiming at a barn door. Though the film interrupts its chases and shootouts to let some fine actors stare meaningfully or spit out a little sagebrush wisdom, it rarely allows them to build the camaraderie that an old cowhand like Gabby Hayes exuded with no sweat." He ultimately came to the conclusion that Silverado "proves it takes more than love of the Western to make a good one. Maybe the dudes at K-Tell were a mite too slick for the job." The staff at TV Guide described how "Lawrence Kasdan bloats the plot with dozens of side stories that, in painfully predictable detail, show how each of our heroes has a reason for being in Silverado and why they decide to stick their necks out. Though much of the running time is devoted to these expository passages, it's all very basic and shallow."

=== Box office ===
The film premiered in cinemas on July 9, 1985, in wide release throughout the United States. During its opening weekend, Silverado opened in seventh place, grossing $3,522,897 at 1,168 locations. The film Back to the Future came in first place during that weekend, grossing $10,555,133. The film's revenue increased by 3% in its second week of release, earning $3,631,204. For that particular weekend, it moved up to fifth place, screening in 1,190 theaters. Back to the Future remained in first place, grossing $10,315,305 in box-office revenue. During its final release week in theaters, Silverado opened in a distant 11th place, with $741,840 in revenue. It went on to top out domestically at $32,192,570 in total ticket sales through an 11-week theatrical run. For 1985 as a whole, Silverado cumulatively ranked at a box-office performance position of 28.

=== Accolades ===
At the 58th Academy Awards, Silverado was nominated for Best Music (Original Score), and Best Sound (Donald O. Mitchell, Rick Kline, Kevin O'Connell, and David M. Ronne). In 1986, the film received a nomination for the Artios Award in the category of Best Casting for a Feature Film (Drama) by the Casting Society of America.

The film is recognized by American Film Institute in these lists:

- 2005: AFI's 100 Years of Film Scores – Nominated
- 2008: AFI's 10 Top 10:
  - Nominated Western Film

== Home media ==
The film was released on RCA CED videodisc format and VHS in December 1985 and on Criterion laserdisc in August 1991. It was rereleased on VHS video format on July 8, 1994. A Collector's Edition VHS and DVD featuring a remastered recording was released on June 1, 1999. However, original copies of that DVD release presented the film in an open matte aspect ratio of 1.85:1. Later copies presented the film in its original 2.39:1 aspect ratio. A two-disc Special Edition DVD was released by Sony Pictures Home Entertainment on April 5, 2005. Special features included "A Return to Silverado with Kevin Costner" featurette, Along the Silverado Trail: A Western Historian's Commentary, Superbit presentation, "Top Western Shootouts" featurette, talent files, bonus previews, an exclusive 16-page movie scrapbook, and collectible Silverado playing cards. Additionally, a single-disc edition, containing only the first disc of the Special Edition DVD, was released on DVD in the United States on February 3, 2009. Special features include filmographies, the making of Silverado, and subtitles in Chinese (Mandarin Traditional), English, Korean, Portuguese, Spanish, and Thai. On October 7, 2025, in honor of the film's 40th anniversary, the film got re-released on a 4K Steelbook courtesy of Sony Pictures Home Entertainment.

== Soundtrack ==
The original motion picture soundtrack for Silverado was released by Geffen Records in 1985. In 1992, Intrada Records issued an expanded edition on compact disc; then on November 12, 2005, an expanded, two-disc version was released by the Intrada Records music label. The score was composed and conducted by Bruce Broughton and mixed by Donald O. Mitchell. Gene Feldman and Erma Levin edited the music.

Silverado: Complete Original Motion Picture Soundtrack

Film score by Bruce Broughton
- Released: November 12, 2005
- Genre: Contemporary classical
- Length: 85:53
- Label: Intrada Records
- Producer: Bruce Broughton

Disc: 1
No.	Title	Length
1.	"Main Title"	4:50
2.	"Paden's Horse"	1:37
3.	"Tyree and Turley"	3:42
4.	"That Ain't Right"	1:17
5.	"Paden's Hat"	3:40
6.	"The Getaway/Riding As One"	6:10
7.	"Den Of Thieves"	1:49
8.	"The Strong Box Rescue"	1:57
9.	"On to Silverado"	6:26
10.	"McKendrick's Men"	1:27
11.	"Ezra's Death"	1:56
12.	"An Understanding Boss"	1:51
13.	"Party Crashers"	1:41
14.	"Tyree and Paden"	0:56
15.	"McKendrick's Brand"	0:53
16.	"You're Empty, Mister/Emmett's Rescue"	3:46
17.	"Behind the Church"	1:19
18.	"Augie is Taken"	2:39
Total length:		47:56

Disc: 2
No.	Title	Length
1.	"Worried About the Dog"	2:12
2.	"Prelude To a Battle"	4:53
3.	"McKendrick Waits/The Stampede/Finishing at McKendrick's"	8:26
4.	"Hide and Watch/Jake Gets Tyree/Then Slick, Then McKendrick"	9:33
5.	"Goodbye, Cobb"	2:09
6.	"We'll Be Back (End Credits)"	4:28
7.	"The Bradley Place"	1:51
8.	"Jake Gets Tyree (Original Version)"	2:19
9.	"The Silverado Waltz"	2:06
Total length:		37:57
