= Darling Companion =

- Directed by: Lawrence Kasdan
- Written by: Lawrence Kasdan; Meg Kasdan
- Produced by: Anthony Bregman; Lawrence Kasdan; Elizabeth Redleaf
- Starring: Mark Duplass; Richard Jenkins; Diane Keaton; Kevin Kline; Elisabeth Moss; Sam Shepard; Dianne Wiest; Ayelet Zurer
- Cinematography: Michael McDonough
- Edited by: Carol Littleton
- Music by: James Newton Howard
- Production companies: Werc Werk Works; Likely Story; Kasdan Pictures
- Distributed by: Sony Pictures Classics (United States); Sierra/Affinity (International)
- Release dates: January 26, 2012 (Santa Barbara Film Festival); April 20, 2012 (United States)
- Running time: 103 minutes
- Country: United States
- Language: English
- Budget: $12 million
- Box office: $793,815

Darling Companion is a 2012 American comedy drama film directed by Lawrence Kasdan, written by Kasdan and his wife Meg, and starring Diane Keaton and Kevin Kline. Filming took place in Utah in 2010 and was released on April 20, 2012.

== Plot ==
Beth Winter (Keaton) along with her daughter, rescues a lost dog from the roadside and names him "Freeway." Her neurosurgeon husband Joseph (Kline), is distracted and self-involved and does not want to keep the dog, despite that Beth has formed a strong friendship with Freeway. When her daughter marries at their cabin in the mountains, Beth is deeply upset when, after the wedding, her husband loses the dog. He fails to pay attention while talking on his phone as Freeway runs after a deer and disappears. All family members assist in a massive search over the next several days to find Freeway, even engaging the services of a psychic gypsy.

Freeway is not found, despite everyone's efforts and the family must leave to return to their busy lives. They board an airplane and while flying over the mountains, Beth sees him. Her once indifferent husband fakes a ruptured appendix in order to convince the pilot to turn the plane around. In one last attempt at a search, they scour the forest where Beth saw the dog from the plane. At last, Freeway appears in a field and runs to Beth. Reunited, the family is brought closer together.

== Cast ==
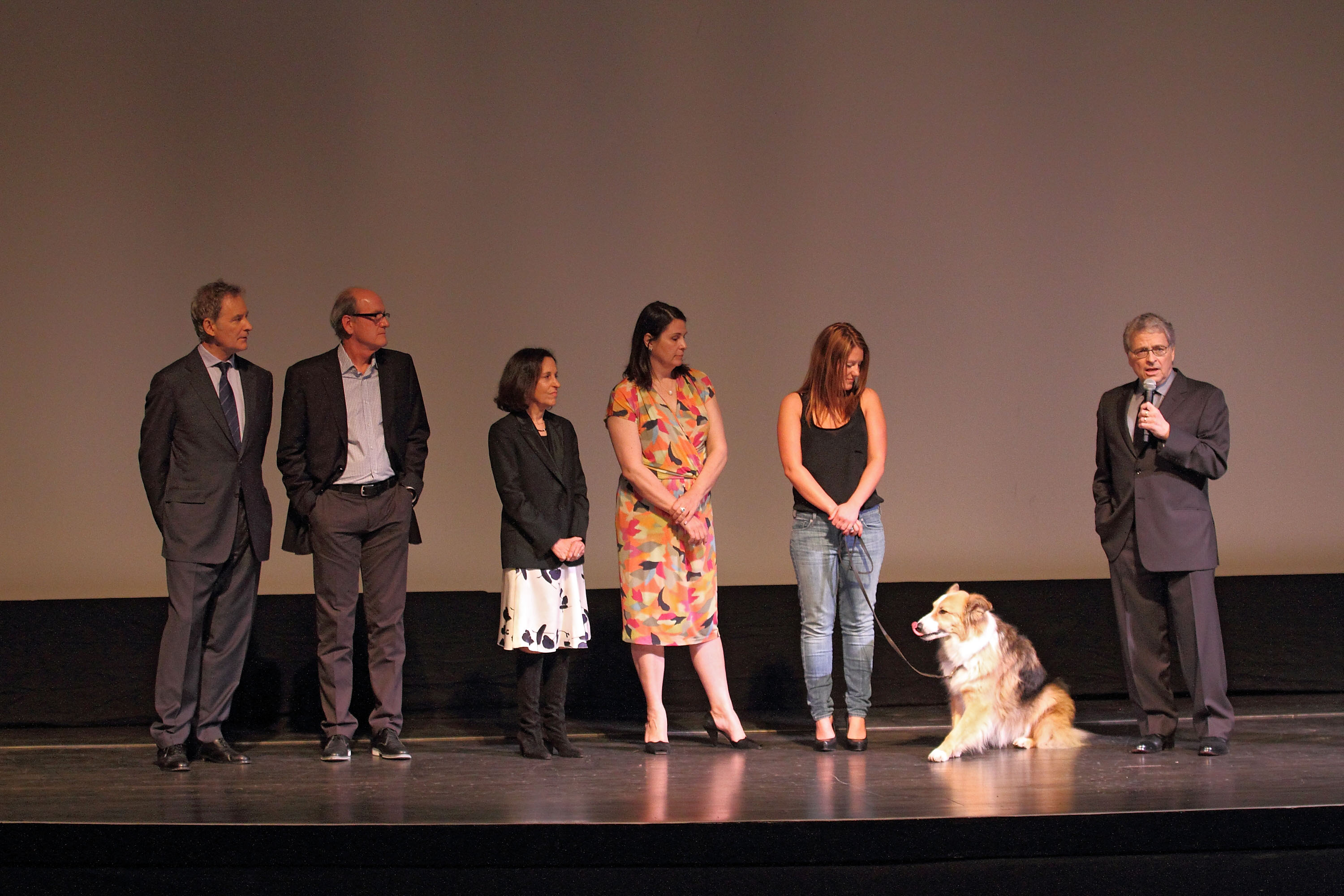
Kevin Kline, Richard Jenkins, Meg Kasdan, Elizabeth Redleaf, Casey (aka Freeway) and Lawrence Kasdan at the 2012 Miami International Film Festival premiere of the film

- Mark Duplass as Bryan Alexander
- Richard Jenkins as Russell
- Diane Keaton as Beth Winter
- Kevin Kline as Dr. Joseph Winter
- Elisabeth Moss as Grace Winter
- Sam Shepard as Sheriff Morris
- Dianne Wiest as Penny Alexander
- Ayelet Zurer as Carmen
- Jay Ali as Sam

== Reception ==
Darling Companion received mixed to unfavorable reviews from critics and was a box-office flop. Rotten Tomatoes gives it a score of 21% based on 90 reviews, with an average rating of 4.46/10. Roger Ebert wrote "It is depressing to reflect on the wealth of talent that conspired to make this inert and listless movie."
