= List of Western films of the 2020s =

This is a list of Western films released in the 2020s.

| Title | Director | Cast | Release date | Country | Subgenre/notes |
|---|---|---|---|---|---|
2020
| Call of the Wild | Chris Sanders | Harrison Ford, Omar Sy, Cara Gee | | United States | Northern Western |
| High Ground | Stephen Johnson | Jacob Junior Nayinggul, Simon Baker, Sean Mununggurr | | Australia | Outback Western |
| JL Family Ranch: The Wedding Gift | Sean McNamara | Jon Voight, Teri Polo, James Caan, Bo Derek, Dylan Walsh, Trevor Donovan, Skyler Shaye, Abby Brammell, Judson Mills, Samuel Mason Paul, Clark Harris, John Moll, Steven Paul | September 27, 2020 | United States | Contemporary Western |
| News of the World | Paul Greengrass | Tom Hanks, Helena Zengel | December 25, 2020 | United States | Traditional Western |
2021
| Catch the Bullet | Michael Feifer | Jay Pickett, Mason McNulty, Gattlin Griffith | | United States | B Western |
| Spirit Untamed | Elaine Bogan | Isabela Merced, Marsai Martin, Mckenna Grace, Walton Goggins, Andre Braugher, Julianne Moore Eiza González, Jake Gyllenhaal, Bridget Hoffman, Lucian Perez, Joe Hart, Alejandra Blengio, Gino Montesinos, Jerry Clarke, Renie Rivas, Gary Hecker, Lew Temple, Gary Anthony Williams | June 4, 2021 | United States | Modern Western |
| The Drover's Wife: The Legend of Molly Johnson | Leah Purcell | Leah Purcell, Rob Collins, Sam Reid, Jessica De Gouw | 18 March 2021 | Australia | Revisionist Western |
| The Harder They Fall | Jeymes Samuel | Jonathan Majors, Idris Elba, Zazie Beetz, Regina King, Delroy Lindo, Lakeith Stanfield, RJ Cyler, Danielle Deadwyler, Edi Gathegi, Deon Cole | October 22, 2021 | United States | Blaxploitation Western |
| The Last Son | Tim Sutton | Sam Worthington, Colson Baker, Thomas Jane | | United States | Traditional Western |
| Old Henry | Potsy Ponciroli | Tim Blake Nelson, Scott Haze, Gavin Lewis | | United States | Traditional Western |
| Three Souls | José Guerrero Urzúa | Daniela Milla, Ermelinda Milla, Paolo Segura, Sandra Cárcamo, Alfredo Poblete, Gonzalo Jara, Danilo Palacios, Claudio Pérez | August 14, 2021 | Chile | |
| The Power of the Dog | Jane Campion | Benedict Cumberbatch, Kirsten Dunst, Jesse Plemons, Kodi Smit-McPhee | November 11, 2021 | New Zealand, United Kingdom, Canada, Australia | Psychological Western |
2022
| The Bounty Men | Brett Bentman | Dylan Hobbs, Whit Kunschik, Bailey Roberts | | United States | B Western |
| Corsicana | Isaiah Washington | Isaiah Washington, Thomas Q. Jones, Lew Temple, Noel Guglielmi, Stacey Dash, Billy Blair, Amber McNut | August 26, 2022 | United States | |
| Dead for a Dollar | Walter Hill | Christoph Waltz, Willem Dafoe, Rachel Brosnahan, Warren Burke, Benjamin Bratt | September 30, 2022 | United States | Traditional Western |
| The Desperate Riders | Michael Feifer | Drew Waters, Vanessa Ebigan, Sam Ashby | | United States | B Western |
| God's Country | Julian Higgins | Thandiwe Newton, Jeremy Bobb, Joris Jarsky, Jefferson White | January 23, 2022 | United States | Modern Western |
| Murder at Yellowstone City | Richard Gray | Isaiah Mustafa, Gabriel Byrne, Thomas Jane, Richard Dreyfuss, Nat Wolff, Anna Camp, Aimee Garcia, Zach McGowan, Scottie Thompson, Emma Kenney, Tanaya Beatty, John Ales, Lew Temple, Lia Marie Johnson, Isabella Ruby, Danny Bohnen | June 24, 2022 | United States | Traditional Western |
| Prey | Dan Trachtenberg | Amber Midthunder, Dakota Beavers, Dane DiLiegro | | United States | Frontier sci-fi Western |
| Terror on the Prairie | Michael Polish | Gina Carano, Nich Searcy, Donald Cerrone | | United States | Traditional Western |
2023
| Birthright Outlaw | Aaron Burns | Sarah Drew, Lucas Black, Olivia Sanabia, Tom Proctor, Jackson Hurst, Jeff Fahey, Janine Turner, Eric Stanton Betts, King Orba, Kristin Clopton, Travis Elliston, Mike Evans, Jeremy Gauna, Jenin Gonzalez | October 13, 2023 | United States | Western, Adventure |
| Butcher's Crossing | Gabe Polsky | Nicolas Cage, Fred Hechinger, Xander Berkeley, Rachel Keller, Jeremy Bobb, Paul Raci | October 20, 2023 | United States | |
| The Dead Don't Hurt | Viggo Mortensen | Viggo Mortensen, Vicky Krieps, Garret Dillahunt, Solly McLeod, Danny Huston, Nadia Litz, W. Earl Brown, Marc Dennis, John Getz, Ray McKinnon | September 8, 2023 | Mexico, Canada, Denmark | |
| Far Haven | Brent Christy | Bailey Chase, Amanda Righetti, Bruce Boxleitner, Martin Kove, A. Martinez | September 3, 2023 | United States | |
| The Old Way | Brett Donowho | Nicolas Cage, Ryan Kiera Armstrong, Noah Le Gros, Clint Howard, Kerry Knuppe, Nick Searcy, Shiloh Fernandez | January 6, 2023 | United States | |
| Organ Trail | Michael Patrick Jann | Zoé De Grand Maison, Sam Trammell, Olivia Grace Applegate | | United States | B Western |
| The Settlers | Felipe Gálvez Haberle | Camilo Arancibia, Benjamín Westfall, Alfredo Castro, Sam Spruell, Marcelo Alonso, Mishell Guaña, Mark Stanley | May 17, 2023 | Chile, Argentina, the United Kingdom, Taiwan, France, Denmark, Sweden, Germany | Exotic Western |
| Killers of the Flower Moon | Martin Scorsese | Leonardo DiCaprio, Robert De Niro, Lily Gladstone, Jesse Plemons, Tantoo Cardinal, John Lithgow, Brendan Fraser, Cara Jade Myers, Jason Isbell, Louis Cancelmi, Scott Shepherd, Tatanka Means, Tommy Schultz, Sturgill Simpson, Gary Basaraba, Charlie Musselwhite, Pat Healy, Steve Witting, Randy Houser, Jack White, Larry Sellers, Barry Corbin, Steve Eastin | October 20, 2023 | United States | Crime drama, Western |
2024
| Andromeda: 1883 | Brett Bentman | Thom Hallum, Michael Dooley, Tom Zembrod, Tiffany McDonald | | United States | Western/Science-Fiction |
| Horizon: An American Saga – Chapter 1 | Kevin Costner | Kevin Costner, Sienna Miller, Sam Worthington, Giovanni Ribisi, Jena Malone, Abbey Lee, Michael Rooker, Danny Huston, Luke Wilson, Isabelle Fuhrman, Jeff Fahey, Will Patton, Tatanka Means, Owen Crow Shoe, Ella Hunt, Jamie Campbell Bower, Thomas Haden Church, Alejandro Edda, Tom Payne, Wasé Chief, Tim Guinee, Michael Angarano, Colin Cunningham, Scott Haze, Angus Macfadyen, Douglas Smith, Jon Beavers, Michael Provost, Kathleen Quinlan, Larry Bagby, James Russo, Dale Dickey | June 28, 2024 | United States | Epic Western |
| The Thicket | Elliott Lester | Peter Dinklage, Juliette Lewis, Levon Hawke, Esmé Creed-Miles | September 6, 2024 | United States | Western, thriller |
2025
| Broke | Carlyle Eubank | Wyatt Russell, Dennis Quaid, Auden Thornton, Mary McDonnell, Johnny Berchtold, Tom Skerritt | May 6, 2025 | United States | Western drama |
| Eddington | Ari Aster | Joaquin Phoenix, Pedro Pascal, Luke Grimes, Deirdre O'Connell, Micheal Ward, Austin Butler, Emma Stone | July 18, 2025 | United States | neo-Western black comedy thriller |
| Heads or Tails? | Alessio Rigo de Righi; Matteo Zoppis | Nadia Tereszkiewicz, Alessandro Borghi, John C. Reilly, Peter Lanzani, Mirko Artuso, Gabriele Silli, Gianni Garko | 2025 | United States | Spaghetti Western |
| Killing Faith | Ned Crowley | Guy Pearce, DeWanda Wise, Raoul Trujillo, Jamie Neumann, Jack Alcott, Joanna Cassidy, Emily Ford, Bill Pullman | October 3, 2025 | United States | Western, Supernatural thriller |
| Long Shadows | William Shockley | Dermot Mulroney, Jacqueline Bisset, Dominic Monaghan, Blaine Maye, Sarah Cortez, Grainger Hines | November 7, 2025 | United States | Epic Western |
| Rebuilding | Max Walker-Silverman | Josh O'Connor, Lily LaTorre, Meghann Fahy, Kali Reis, Amy Madigan, | January 26, 2025 at 2025 Sundance Film Festival and November 14, 2025 in the United States | United States | neo-Western, drama |
| The Unholy Trinity | Richard Gray | Pierce Brosnan, Samuel L. Jackson, Brandon Lessard, Ethan Peck | June 13, 2025 | United States | Western, action |

== Upcoming ==
| Title | Director | Cast | Release date | Country | Subgenre/notes |
|---|---|---|---|---|---|
2027
| The Rescue | Potsy Ponciroli | Brandon Sklenar, Hassie Harrison, Josh Lucas, Nick Searcy, Lorelei Olivia Mote, Austin Amelio, Spencer Treat Clark, Tim Blake Nelson, Josh Duhamel | | United States | Contemporary Western |
TBA
| Bethesda | Andrew Lewis, Isaac Lewis | Max Martini, Brianna Hildebrand, James Landry Hébert, Julio Cesar Cedillo, Verónica Falcón, Marlene Forte, Drew Van Acker, Mark Ashworth | | United States | Neo-Western thriller |
| Big Thunder Mountain | Bert & Bertie | | | United States | Western adventure |
| Blood Meridian | John Hillcoat | | | United States | Revisionist Western, historical |
| Blood on the Promontory | Ray Mendoza | Sam Worthington, Jai Courtney, Jack Quaid, Jaeden Martell, LaMonica Garrett, Kevin Rankin, Noel Fisher, Tokala Black Elk, Dallas Roberts, Spencer Jarman | | United States | Contemporary Western, drama |
| Comanche | Scott Cooper | | | United States | Traditional Western, biopic |
| Django/Zorro | TBA | | | United States | Revisionist Western, action |
| Dracula | Chloé Zhao | | | United States | Monster, sci-fi, Western |
| Empire Of The Summer Moon | Taylor Sheridan | | | United States | Traditional Western, biopic |
| Ezekiel Moss | James Gray | | | United States | Traditional Western, supernatural drama |
| Fallon | TBA | | | United States | Traditional Western |
| Flint | Ryan Whitaker | Josh Holloway, Sarah Gadon, Max Martini, Dianna Agron, Mike Vogel, Charles Esten | | United States | Western drama |
| Guns 3 | TBA | Emilio Estevez | | United States | Western, action |
| Horizon: An American Saga – Chapter 2 | Kevin Costner | Kevin Costner, Sienna Miller, Sam Worthington, Giovanni Ribisi | | United States | Epic Western |
| Horizon: An American Saga – Chapter 3 | Kevin Costner | Kevin Costner, Sienna Miller, Sam Worthington, Giovanni Ribisi, Ella Hunt, Will Patton, Luke Wilson, Isabelle Fuhrman, Thomas Haden Church, Glynn Turman, Kathleen Quinlan | | United States | Epic Western |
| Horizon: An American Saga – Chapter 4 | Kevin Costner | Kevin Costner, Sienna Miller, Sam Worthington, Giovanni Ribisi | | United States | Epic Western |
| Kate Warne | Jaume Collet-Serra | Emily Blunt | | United States | Western, action thriller |
| Man of War | Tim Story | Samuel L. Jackson | | United States | Traditional Western |
| Oregon Trail | Will Speck and Josh Gordon | | | United States | Action comedy Western |
| Outside Man | Brian Helgeland | Tommy Lee Jones, Ice Cube | | United States | Contemporary Western, crime thriller |
| The Brigands of Rattlecreek | Park Chan-wook | Matthew McConaughey, Austin Butler, Pedro Pascal, Tang Wei | | United States | Western thriller |
| The Creed of Violence | Ed Zwick | | | United States | Western |
| The Gunfighter | Ethan Hawke | | | United States | Western |
| The Pinkerton | Jason Bateman | | | United States | Supernatural revenge thriller, Western |
| The Stalemate | Nicholas Arioli | Ben Foster, Manny Jacinto, Fiona Shaw | | United States | Absurdist Western comedy |
| The Unbelievers | Mike Watson | Tim McGraw | | United States | Contemporary Western |

== See also ==
- List of Western television series
