= Sam Worthington =

Australian actor (born 1976)

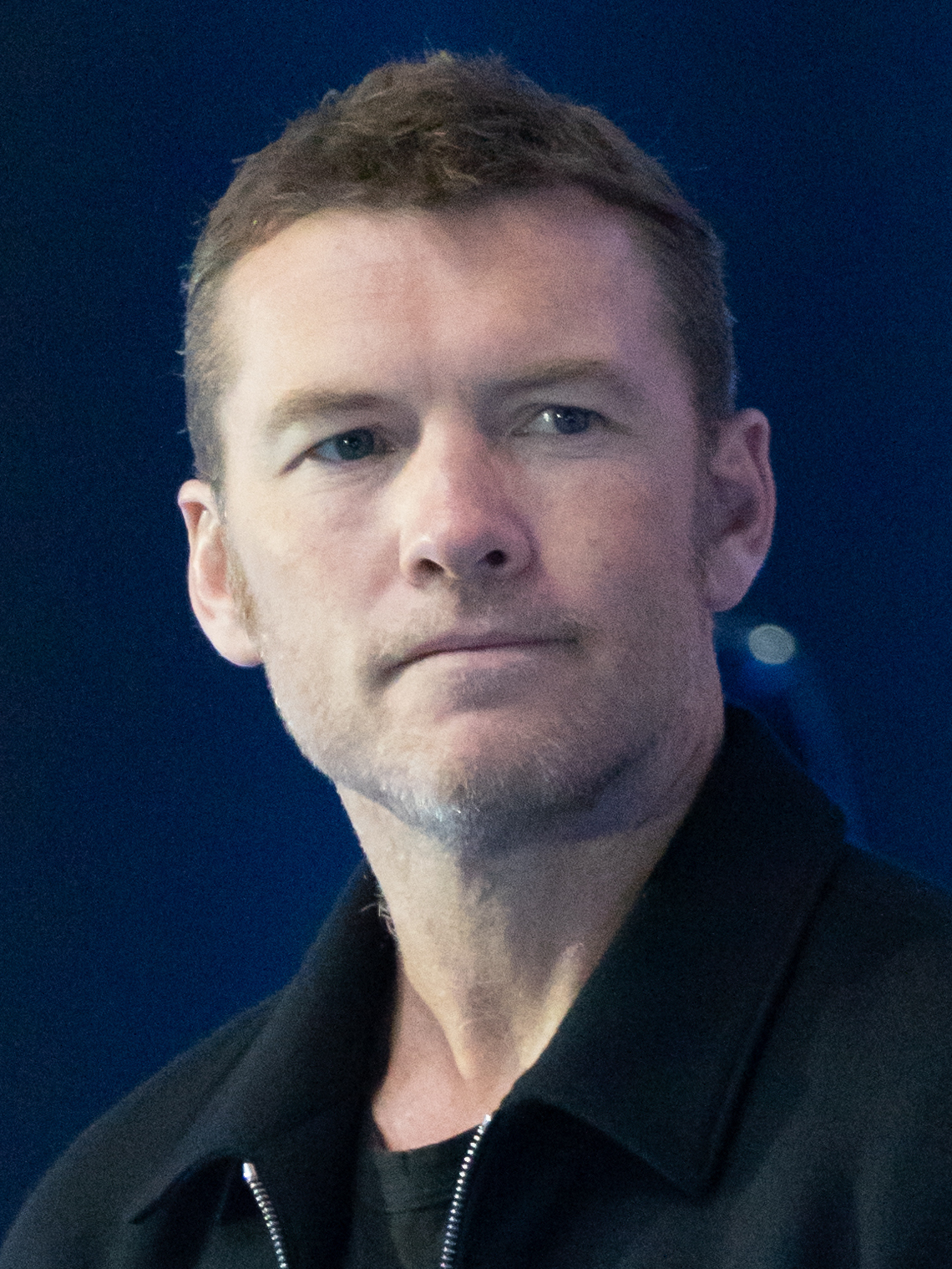
- Worthington in 2022
- Born: Samuel Henry John Worthington; 2 August 1976 (age 50); Godalming, Surrey, England
- Citizenship: Australia; United Kingdom
- Education: National Institute of Dramatic Art (BFA)
- Occupation: Actor
- Years active: 2000–present
- Spouse: Lara Bingle (m. 2014)
- Children: 3

Samuel Henry John Worthington (born 2 August 1976) is an Australian actor who has worked in both independent Australian cinema and Hollywood. He rose to prominence in Australia with performances in the films Bootmen (2000) and Somersault (2004), receiving Australia Film Institute Award for Best Actor in a Leading Role nominations for both films and winning the latter, and gained further recognition through his role in the TV series Love My Way. Worthington achieved international fame as protagonist Jake Sully in James Cameron's Avatar (2009), the 2nd highest-grossing film of all time, and received a second AFI award for the film; he reprised his role in its sequels.

He also starred in other studio productions including Terminator Salvation (2009), Clash of the Titans (2010), and Wrath of the Titans (2012), while voicing the lead character Alex Mason in the popular Call of Duty: Black Ops video game series. In the 2010s and beyond, Worthington diversified his roles with appearances in the films Everest (2015), Hacksaw Ridge (2016), and The Shack (2017), and received critical praise for his television work in Manhunt: Unabomber (2017), Under the Banner of Heaven (2022), and I Will Find You (2026). His recent film credits include Lift (2024), The Exorcism (2024), and the Horizon: An American Saga western series.

== Early life and education ==
Samuel Henry John Worthington was born in England to British parents. They moved to Perth, Western Australia, when he was 6 months old. He was raised in Warnbro, a suburb of Perth. His mother, Jeanne J. Worthington (née Martyn), is a housewife, and his father, Ronald W. Worthington, is a power plant labourer. He has a sister, Lucinda.

Worthington attended Rockingham Senior High School and John Curtin College of the Arts, a high school specialising in the dramatic arts, located in Fremantle, Western Australia, where he studied drama but did not graduate. After leaving high school, his father gave him $400 and sent him on a one-way trip to Cairns, Queensland, telling him to "work his way home". He began working on construction and odd jobs, eventually settling in Sydney. At the age of 19, while working as a bricklayer, he auditioned for the National Institute of Dramatic Art and was accepted with a scholarship.

== Career ==
=== 2000–2008: Australian recognition ===
Worthington played a major role alongside Adam Garcia in the Australian dance film Bootmen (2000). He played a lead roles in the Australian movies Dirty Deeds (2002) and Gettin' Square (2003).

Worthington had a major role in Somersault (2004), for which he won the AFI Award for Best Lead Actor. He was well known in Australia for his role as Howard in the acclaimed TV series Love My Way, in which he played the female lead's main love interest. In 2006, he played the lead in a modern retelling of Macbeth. Worthington's international film career began with a series of small roles in Hollywood production The Great Raid (2005), which was filmed in Australia. He auditioned for the role of James Bond in Casino Royale but lost the role to Daniel Craig. He starred in the Australian creature-feature film Rogue (2007), which gained a 100% fresh rating from Rotten Tomatoes.

=== 2009–2012: Avatar and early momentum ===
In 2009, Worthington starred in James Cameron-directed science-fiction film Avatar, in which he played the role of Jake Sully, a paraplegic former U.S. Marine who is at the centre of a war between his own species and the indigenous Na'vi people of Pandora. The film was a success, amassing critical acclaim and several accolades. It became the highest-grossing film of all time, grossing more than $2.8 billion ($4.1 billion adjusted for inflation) worldwide. It won him the Saturn Award for Best Actor and another AACTA Award.

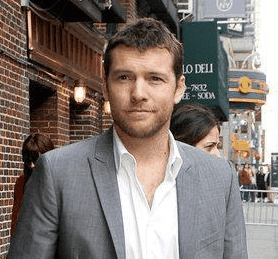
Worthington in 2010

In November 2010, Worthington told GQ Australia that when he auditioned for the role, he was not told what it was for, which annoyed him. "I was a bit pissed off, and I think that came across. I think Jim saw a spark and liked it because that's Sully's character – a guy who doesn't like to be bullied and a guy who wants to set things right." He later said that Cameron "changed his life" and he will always be grateful to him.

After auditioning for Cameron, Worthington consequently landed the part in 2009's science fiction action film Terminator Salvation, thanks to Cameron's personal recommendation to fellow filmmaker McG. In the film, Worthington co-starred alongside Christian Bale and played Marcus Wright, a human-terminator hybrid. Terminator Salvation was released on May 21, 2009, grossed over $371.4 million, and received mixed reviews.

In early 2010, Worthington appeared in Clash of the Titans, an action fantasy film directed by Louis Leterrier and produced by Metro-Goldwyn-Mayer. Worthington headlined the film. It received generally negative reviews from critics but grossed $493 million worldwide and was the 11th highest-grossing film of 2010. He provided voice work for Captain Alex Mason, the protagonist in the video game Call of Duty: Black Ops. Some gamers criticised Worthington's inability to mask his Australian accent, as in Avatar. In November 2010, The Hollywood Reporter named Worthington as one of the young male actors who are "pushing – or being pushed" into taking over Hollywood. Also in 2010, Forbes named Worthington among Hollywood's highest grossing actors. He was selected as one of the entrants to the Who's Who in Australia 2011 edition.

In 2012, Worthington starred in Wrath of the Titans, the sequel to Clash of the Titans. The film received mostly negative reviews from critics, and although it grossed $302 million at the box office and emerged successful, the film underperformed compared to its predecessor. He reprised his role as Alex Mason in Call of Duty: Black Ops II. Also in 2012, Worthington starred as Nick Cassidy in Man on a Ledge, a suspense-thriller film directed by Asger Leth. Though the film received mixed reviews from critics, Worthington's performance received praise, with The New Zealand Herald describing him as "suitably terrified".

=== 2013–2021: Diverse roles ===
In 2013, Worthington worked in Drift (2013), an Australian film about the birth of the surf industry in the 1970s. He starred alongside Arnold Schwarzenegger in the Hollywood action thriller film Sabotage (2014). A loose adaptation of the Agatha Christie novel And Then There Were None, it received generally negative reviews and was a box office bomb. Worthington next appeared in the drama film Cake (2014). Headlined by Jennifer Aniston, it debuted in the Special Presentations section of the 2014 Toronto International Film Festival. In the same year, he played a supporting role in the western film The Keeping Room.

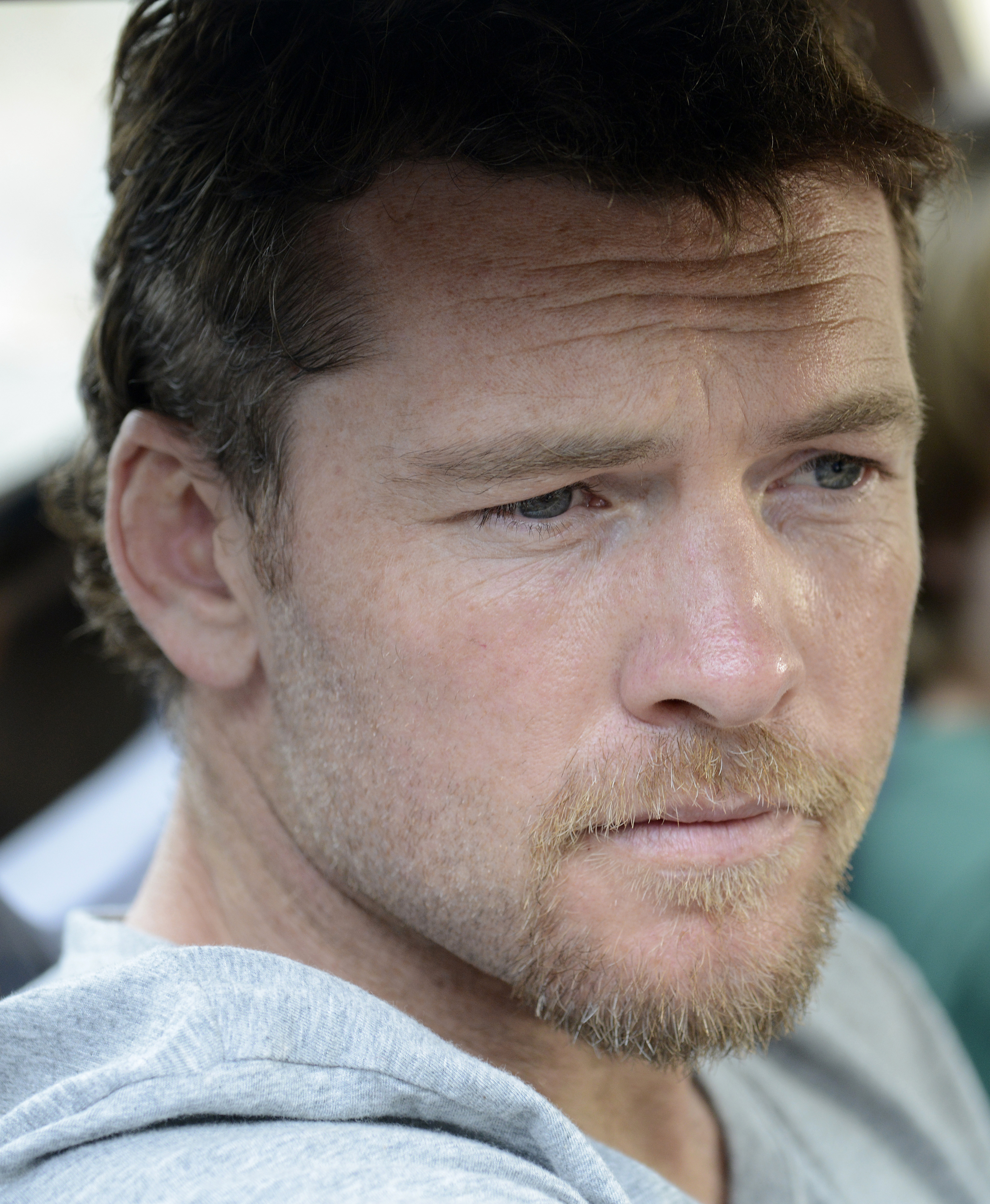
Worthington in 2014

In 2015, Worthington starred in Paper Planes, an Australian 3D children's drama film directed by Robert Connolly. The film tells a story about Dylan, a young boy who lives in Australia, who finds out that he has a talent for making paper planes and dreams of competing in the World Paper Plane Championships in Japan. He followed it up by playing Willem Holleeder in Kidnapping Freddy Heineken (2015), based on the 1983 kidnapping of Freddy Heineken. He portrayed a character in Baltasar Kormákur's Everest, based on the 1996 Mount Everest disaster; the film was a commercial success, grossing $203 million worldwide.

In 2016, he played Captain Jack Glover, a stern army officer, in the Mel Gibson directed biographical war film Hacksaw Ridge. The film focuses on the World War II experiences of Desmond Doss, an American pacifist combat medic who refused to carry or use a weapon or firearm of any kind. Hacksaw Ridge was released in the United States on November 4, 2016, grossing $180.4 million worldwide, and received critical acclaim. The film was awarded several accolades. Worthington worked with Stuart Hazeldine on The Shack, a 2017 American Christian drama film. Based on the 2007 novel of the same name, it opened to mixed critical reviews and was a success, as it grossed over $96 million worldwide. That year, Worthington portrayed Jim Fitzgerald in the Discovery Channel television series Manhunt: Unabomber.

In 2018, he starred in the Netflix original science fiction thriller film The Titan. In 2019, Worthington starred as Ray Monroe in the Netflix thriller film Fractured. He followed it up by playing a supporting role in Harvey Keitel starrer biographical crime drama Lansky (2021), based on the life of gangster Meyer Lansky. Richard Roeper from Chicago Sun Times praised the on-screen chemistry of Keital and Worthington. He earned the lead role in Tim Sutton's western The Last Son (2021), and made an appearance on Australian ABC TV drama Fires.

=== 2022–present: Avatar sequels and various projects ===
Worthington reprised his role as Jake Sully in Avatar: The Way of Water (2022). The plot features Jake Sully’s family fleeing to the sea and joining reef clans to protect their home from returning human invaders. Much like its predecessor, it was a critical and commercial success. Upon release, it broke multiple records and grossed over $2.320 billion worldwide, making it the highest-grossing film of 2022 and the third-highest-grossing film of all time. The same year saw him play a role in the anticipated miniseries Under the Banner of Heaven, which received positive reviews and high viewership ratings. The following year, he received two award nominations: Best Actor at the 51st Saturn Awards for Avatar, and Best Supporting Actor at the 27th Satellite Awards for the aforementioned show.

2024 was a busy year for Worthington as he had supporting roles in various projects. He first played a part in Kevin Hart led heist comedy Lift which was released on Netflix. He followed this up with the dystopian science fiction Breathe, Joshua John Miller directorial The Exorcism alongside Russell Crowe, John Woo's Peacock original action film The Killer, and David Mackenzie's thriller Relay. Additionally, he went onto work with Giovanni Ribisi, his co-star from the Avatar series, in the Kevin Costner-directed western-drama films Horizon: An American Saga – Chapter 1 and Horizon: An American Saga – Chapter 2 as First Lt. Trent Gephardt. Eager to reunite with the director of his previous film, Relay, Worthington collaborated with David Mackenzie on the 2025 thriller, Fuze. The film centers on the discovery of an unexploded bomb at a London construction site. Worthington, who was written into the film at his own request to Mackenzie, played X, the leader of a band of criminals. Fuze premiered at Toronto International Film Festival and received positive reviews.

Worthington returned as Jake Sully in the third film in Avatar franchise, Avatar: Fire and Ash. In the film, the Sullys face the Ash People, a vengeful volcanic clan allied with humans, challenging their bond with Eywa. Thomas Butt of Collider described his performance as understated, noting that Worthington has fully matured in the role throughout the franchise. Butt specifically praised his ability to depict the internal conflict between Jake's human tendencies and his acquired Na'vi customs.

Worthington will appear as Antipater in the upcoming 2026 film Zero A. D.: The Birth of Christ, a dramatization of the events around the Massacre of the Innocents.

== Personal life ==
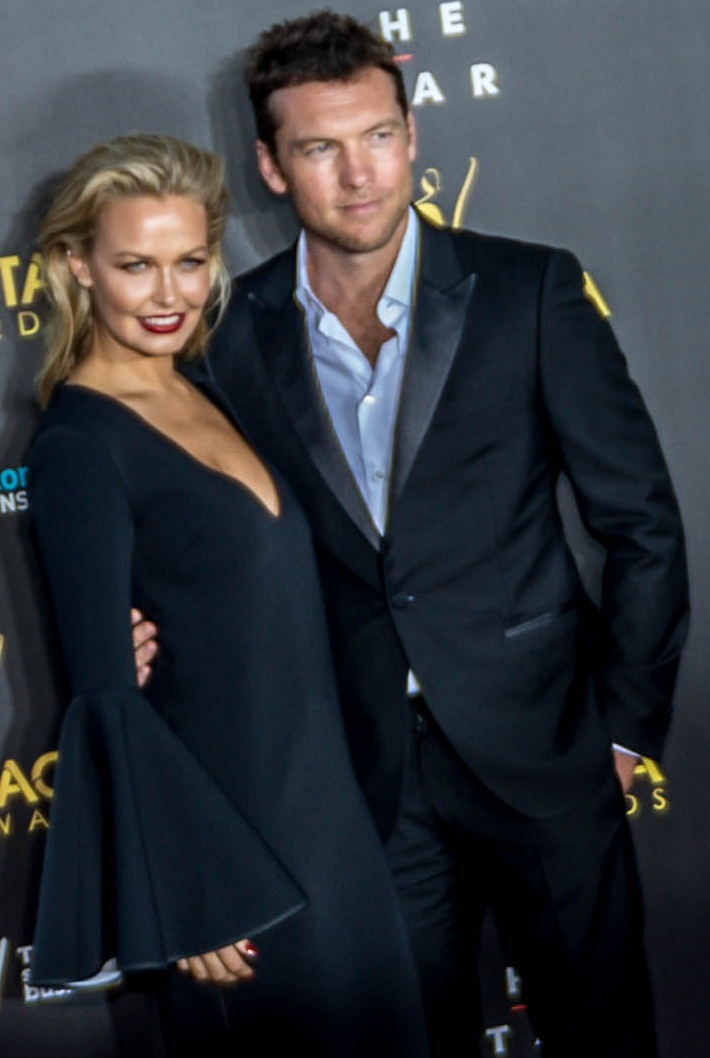
Worthington and wife Lara at the 2014 AACTA Awards.

Worthington is a vegetarian.

Worthington has reported that, when he was about 30, he sold most of his possessions, bought a car with the proceeds, and was living in it before he auditioned for Avatar.

On 18 October 2013, Worthington confirmed his relationship with model Lara Bingle. They married on 28 December 2014 and have three sons born in 2015, 2016 and 2020. Worthington is a Christian and recovering alcoholic. He says that he began drinking heavily as a means to cope with his loss of privacy following his increase in popularity after Avatar's release and stopped after his wife Lara gave him an ultimatum. He has been sober since 2014.

=== Legal issues ===
On 23 February 2014, Worthington was arrested in New York City for assault after punching a paparazzo, Sheng Li, who followed Bingle to get a "perfect picture". After the incident, Worthington claimed that Sheng Li kicked Bingle, and he had to step in. Video footage of the incident depicts Worthington referring to Bingle as his "wife", furthering speculation about the pair's marital status. Worthington was initially released on a desk appearance ticket, while Li was arrested on charges of reckless endangerment, assault, and harassment.

On 26 February 2014, Worthington appeared in Manhattan Criminal Court, where he was ordered to stay away from Li for six months. The case was adjourned until 8 May 2014, with the actor to face charges of assault in the third degree, attempted assault, and harassment. On 1 April 2014, Li blamed Bingle for starting the fight and called for her to be arrested. Later that month, Worthington secured a conditional discharge deal on a misdemeanour assault charge, thereby avoiding any jail time, while the charges against Li were dismissed "in the interest of justice". Li then filed a $3.7 million civil lawsuit against Worthington, which was settled out of court before going to trial in September 2015.

== Filmography ==
Key
†	Denotes films that have not yet been released

=== Film ===
Year	Title	Role	Notes	Ref.
2000	Life in a Volkswagen	Unknown	Short film	
2000	Bootmen	Mitchell Okden		
2001	A Matter of Life	Our Hero	Short film	
2002	Hart's War	Corporal B.J. "Depot" Guidry		
2002	New Skin	Peter		
2002	Dirty Deeds	Darcy Ryan		
2003	Gettin' Square	Barry "Wattsy" Wirth		
2004	Enzo	Director	Short film; also writer, composer, & cinematographer	
2004	Somersault	Joe		
2004	Thunderstruck	Ronnie		
2005	The Great Raid	Private First Class Lucas		
2005	Pros and Ex-Cons	Able		
2006	A Fairytale of the City	The Artist	Short film	
2006	Macbeth	Lord Macbeth		
2007	Rogue	Neil Kelly		
2009	Terminator Salvation	Marcus Wright		
2009	Avatar	Jake Sully / Tom Sully		
2010	Clash of the Titans	Perseus		
2010	The Debt	Young David Peretz		
2010	Last Night	Michael Reed		
2010	Love & Distrust	Miles	Segment: "Blue Poles (Suspicion & Sincerity)"	
2011	Texas Killing Fields	Detective Mike Souder		
2012	Man on a Ledge	Nick Cassidy		
2012	Wrath of the Titans	Perseus		
2012	Scratch	Executive Producer	Short film	
2013	Drift	JB		
2014	Sabotage	DEA Agent James "Monster" Murray		
2014	Cake	Roy Collins		
2014	The Keeping Room	Moses		
2015	Paper Planes	Jack Webber		
2015	Kidnapping Freddy Heineken	Willem Holleeder		
2015	Everest	Guy Cotter		
2016	Hacksaw Ridge	Captain Jack Glover		
2017	The Shack	Mackenzie "Mack" Philips		
2017	The Hunter's Prayer	Stephen Lucas	Also producer	
2018	The Titan	Lieutenant Rick Janssen		
2019	Fractured	Ray Monroe		
2021	Lansky	David Stone		
2021	The Last Son	Isaac Lemay		
2022	9 Bullets	Jack		
2022	Avatar: The Way of Water	Jake Sully		
2023	Transfusion	Ryan Logan	Also executive producer	
2023	Simulant	Kessler		
2024	Lift	Huxley		
2024	Breathe	Lucas		
2024	Horizon: An American Saga – Chapter 1	First Lieutenant Trent Gephardt		
2024	The Exorcism	Joe		
2024	The Killer	Finn		
2024	Horizon: An American Saga – Chapter 2	First Lieutenant Trent Gephardt		
2024	Relay	Dawson		
2025	Fuze	X		
2025	Avatar: Fire and Ash	Jake Sully		
2026	Zero A. D.: The Birth of Christ †	Antipater	Post-production	
TBA	Alphas †	TBA	Post-production	
TBA	Horizon: An American Saga – Chapter 3 †	First Lieutenant Trent Gephardt	Post-production	
TBA	The Exiles †	TBA	Post-production	
TBA	Non Compos Mentis †	TBA	Post-production	

=== Television ===
Year	Title	Role	Notes	Ref.
2000	JAG	Dunsmore	Episode: "Boomerang: Part 1"	
2000	Water Rats	Phillip Champion	Episode: "Able to Leap Tall Buildings"	
2000	Blue Heelers	Shane Donovan	Episode: "Bloodlines"	
2004	Love My Way	Howard Light	Main role; 7 episodes (season 1)	
2005	The Surgeon	Dr. Sam Dash	Main role; 8 episodes	
2006	Two Twisted	Gus Rogers	Episode: "Delivery Man"	
2013–2014	Cleaners	Executive Producer	18 episodes	
2015	Deadline Gallipoli	Phillip Schuler	Miniseries; 2 episodes (also executive producer)	
2017	Manhunt	Jim Fitzgerald	Main role; 7 episodes (season 1)	
2021	Fires	Glen Findlay	Miniseries; 2 episodes	
2022	Under the Banner of Heaven	Ron Lafferty	Miniseries; 7 episodes	
2026	I Will Find You	David Burroughs	Miniseries; 8 episodes	

=== Video games ===
Year	Title	Role	Notes	Ref.
2010	Call of Duty: Black Ops	Alex Mason		
2012	Call of Duty: Black Ops II	Alex Mason		
2018	Call of Duty: Black Ops 4	Alex Mason	Specialist HQ and Blackout Character	

== Awards and nominations ==
Award	Year	Category	Nominated work	Result	Ref.
AACTA Awards	2000	Best Actor	Bootmen	Nominated	
AACTA Awards	2004	Best Actor	Somersault	Won	
AACTA Awards	2010	Best International Actor	Avatar	Won	
Empire Awards	2010	Best Actor	Avatar	Nominated	
Film Critics Circle of Australia Awards	2002	Best Supporting Actor	Dirty Deeds	Nominated	
Film Critics Circle of Australia Awards	2004	Best Actor	Somersault	Nominated	
Film Critics Circle of Australia Awards	2014	Best Actor	Drift	Nominated	
Giffoni Film Festival Awards	2010	Honoree	—	Won	
MTV Movie & TV Awards	2010	Best Fight (shared with Stephen Lang)	Avatar	Nominated	
MTV Movie & TV Awards	2010	Best Kiss (shared with Zoe Saldaña)	Avatar	Nominated	
MTV Movie & TV Awards	2010	Biggest Badass Star	—	Nominated	
Nickelodeon Kids' Choice Awards	2010	Cutest Couple (shared with Zoe Saldaña)	Avatar	Nominated	
Satellite Awards	2023	Best Supporting Actor – Series, Miniseries or Television Film	Under the Banner of Heaven	Nominated	
Saturn Awards	2010	Best Actor	Avatar	Won	
Saturn Awards	2024	Best Actor	Avatar: The Way of Water	Nominated	
Saturn Awards	2026	Best Actor	Avatar: Fire and Ash	Nominated	
Scream Awards	2009	Breakout Performance – Male	Terminator Salvation	Nominated	
ShoWest Awards	2010	Male Star of the Year	—	Won	
Teen Choice Awards	2009	Choice Movie: Male Fresh Face	Terminator Salvation	Nominated	
Teen Choice Awards	2010	Choice Movie Actor: Sci-Fi	Avatar	Won	
Teen Choice Awards	2010	Choice Movie: Fight (shared with Stephen Lang)	Avatar	Nominated	
Teen Choice Awards	2010	Choice Movie Actor: Fantasy	Clash of the Titans	Nominated	
Washington D.C. Area Film Critics Association Awards	2022	Best Motion Capture Performance	Avatar: The Way of Water	Nominated	
Washington D.C. Area Film Critics Association Awards	2025	Best Motion Capture Performance	Avatar: Fire and Ash	Nominated	

== See also ==
- List of Australian film actors
