= Kim Kershaw =

Australian rules footballer (born 1959)

Personal information
- Born: 25 January 1959 (age 67)
- Original team: Wagga Wagga
- Height: 198 cm (6 ft 6 in)
- Weight: 106 kg (234 lb)

Playing career^{1}
| Years | Club | Games (Goals) |
| 1979–1980 | Richmond | 5 (0) |
| 1981–1982 | Hawthorn | 4 (0) |
| Total | | 9 (0) |
- ^{1} Playing statistics correct to the end of 1982.

Kim Kershaw (born 25 January 1959) is a former Australian rules footballer who played with Richmond and Hawthorn in the Victorian Football League (VFL).

== VFL years ==
Kershaw grew up in Wagga Wagga and started his VFL career at South Melbourne, but only got as high as reserve level. He was swapped by South Melbourne for Richmond rover Jon Hummel. In 1979 and 1980 he played a total of five senior games for Richmond, as a ruckman. He was traded to Hawthorn during the 1981 VFL season, along with a transfer fee, in return for veteran Alan Martello. His only league appearance for Hawthorn that year came when in round 17, when ruckman Don Scott was unavailable. Scott retired at the end of the season, but Hawthorn then recruited Michael Byrne and Kershaw only played three games in 1982.

== Williamstown and coaching ==
Kershaw went on play 81 games for Victorian Football Association side Williamstown between 1983 and 1988, which included a premiership in 1986. Named on the interchange bench in Williamstown's official Team of the Century, Kershaw won four successive best and fairest awards from 1983 to 1986, the only player in the club's history to have done so, and placed second for the 1984 J. J. Liston Trophy.

He coached Team Africa at the 2008 Australian Football International Cup.

== Personal life ==
His daughter, Abbey Lee, is a fashion model and actress.
