= Kat and the Band =

2020 British film

- Film poster
- Directed by: E. E. Hegarty
- Written by: Jemma Field; Michael Müller
- Produced by: Ian Davies; Rebecca Long; Stella Nwimo
- Starring: Ella Hunt; Dougie Poynter; Jennifer Leong; Callum McGowan; Idris Debrand; Sevan Stephan; Joanna David; Badly Drawn Boy; Jackson Bews; Katherine Kelly; Rufus Hound
- Cinematography: Annemarie Lean-Vercoe
- Edited by: Andy Morrison
- Music by: Some Velvet Morning; Nina Humphreys
- Production company: Boudica Indigo
- Distributed by: 101 Films
- Release dates: March 2020 (London); 13 July 2020 (United Kingdom)
- Running time: 92 minutes
- Country: United Kingdom
- Language: English

Kat and the Band is a 2020 British coming-of-age musical film directed by E. E. Hegarty from a screenplay by Jemma Field and Michael Müller. The film stars Ella Hunt, Dougie Poynter, Jennifer Leong, Callum McGowan, Idris Debrand, Sevan Stephan, Joanna David, Badly Drawn Boy, Jackson Bews, Katherine Kelly, and Rufus Hound. It premiered at the London Independent Film Festival in March 2020 and was released in the United Kingdom on July 13, 2020, by 101 Films. The film follows Kat Malone, a seventeen year old music-obsessed school girl who tricks her way into managing struggling band Dollar Days by posing to be a twenty-something band manager.

== Cast ==
- Ella Hunt as Kat Malone
- Dougie Poynter as Alex
- Jennifer Leong as Jane
- Callum McGowan as Brian
- Idris Debrand as Sid
- Sevan Stephan as Faz
- Joanna David as Gran
- Badly Drawn Boy as himself
- Jackson Bews as Marcus
- Katherine Kelly as Liz Malone
- Rufus Hound as Mr. Cato
