= Abbey Lee =

Australian model, actress and musician (born 1987)

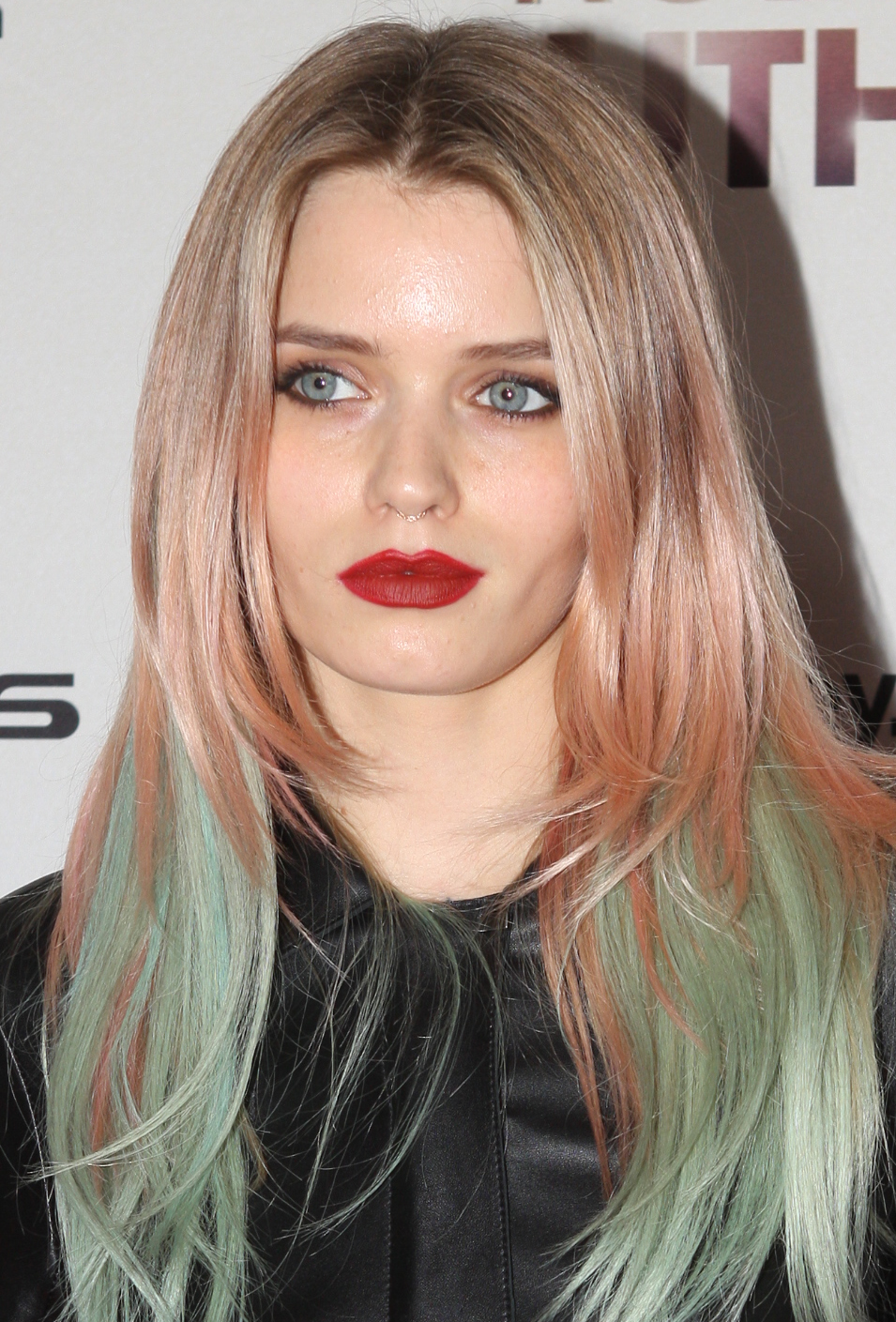
- Lee in 2015
- Born: Abbey Lee Kershaw; 12 June 1987 (age 39); Melbourne, Victoria, Australia
- Occupations: Model; actress; musician
- Years active: 2004–present
- Parent: Kim Kershaw (father)

Abbey Lee Kershaw (born 12 June 1987) is an Australian model, actress and musician. Following several years of success leading up to the 2011 fashion seasons, V magazine dubbed her a supermodel, and Models.com has listed her as an "Industry Icon". She dropped the use of her surname, Kershaw, in 2015.

== Early life ==
Lee was born in Melbourne, Victoria, the daughter of Kerry, a psychologist, and Kim Kershaw, who played in the Victorian Football League for Richmond and Hawthorn. She is their middle child. She has said that as a child, she was "always in the hospital". At age four, she suffered from meningitis and had to have two spinal taps. She also had a tumour on her knee, and several broken bones from climbing trees.

Lee grew up in Kensington, Victoria and attended St Michael's Catholic Primary School in North Melbourne. She has said that she "grew up with 42 nationalities", explaining that her primary school of 150 children was very multicultural. She then attended the Academy of Mary Immaculate in Fitzroy.

Lee has said that she "did not come from wealth" and had various jobs while a teenager, including working at a fun fair, as a grocery clerk, and at a McDonald's. She took jujitsu classes for seven years and was involved in other sports.

In 2004, Lee won the Australian Girlfriend Model Search. Her rebellious side got her in trouble, she was “politely asked to depart” her high school at the beginning of her final year. In 2005, after high school, she moved from Melbourne to Sydney to begin modelling. She lived 100 metres (330 ft) from the beach, and it was while at the beach that she was scouted by Chic Management's Kathy Ward, who also discovered Miranda Kerr and Samantha Harris. She signed with Chic Management within weeks.

== Career ==
=== 2007–2009 ===
In 2007, Lee signed with Next Management and by March had relocated to New York City. On 11 December, Models.com named her the "Next Superstar".

Lee made her debut in the 2008 New York Fashion Week, managing to walk a total of 29 shows for designers such as Oscar de la Renta, Halston, and notably closing for Rodarte. For her first time in Milan Fashion Week, she was booked as a Gucci exclusive. Later that year, in September, she fell in her high heels at the Rodarte show in New York. Then, a month later in Paris, she fainted at the Alexander McQueen show for Natural Dis-tinction Un-natural Selection from wearing a very tight leather corset. These two incidents, however, did not prevent her from booking more runway shows. Lee was one of new faces to appear on one of the fourteen covers of V magazine's Autumn issue. On 15 November 2008, in Miami, she made her international TV appearance at the Victoria's Secret Fashion Show, modelling in the "Pink Planet" segment.

Lee has starred in the fragrance ads for Gucci's new "Flora" scent since 2008.

In November 2009, Fashion TV placed her first in their First Face Countdown for Spring/Summer 2010. Lee had to sit out the Autumn 2009 shows due to a knee injury: she had torn ligaments and could barely walk. She was featured in the explicit shoot for the French magazine Purple Fashion published Autumn/Winter 2009. The infamous spread, shot by photographer Terry Richardson, caused outrage in the blogosphere, where Richardson was accused of cajoling the girls for his own sexual satisfaction. In his defense, Lee said, "Terry doesn't force girls to do anything they don't want to. He puts you in a G-string in a pile of mud because you want to do it. You touch yourself because you want to. For me, that shoot was the truth about how things were between us both, and I felt good doing it. I'm not ashamed of it—why should I be?" After skipping the Autumn 2009 season owing to a knee injury, she reappeared in Milan Fashion Week, opening D&G to having the first and last looks at Fendi and Versace, prompting New York magazine to name her "Milan's Top Model". On 1 December 2009, for the second time, she participated in the Victoria's Secret Fashion Show, but this time she had three outfits, modelling in the "Star Trooper," "Pink Planet", and in the "Enchanted Forest" segment.

=== 2010–2011 ===
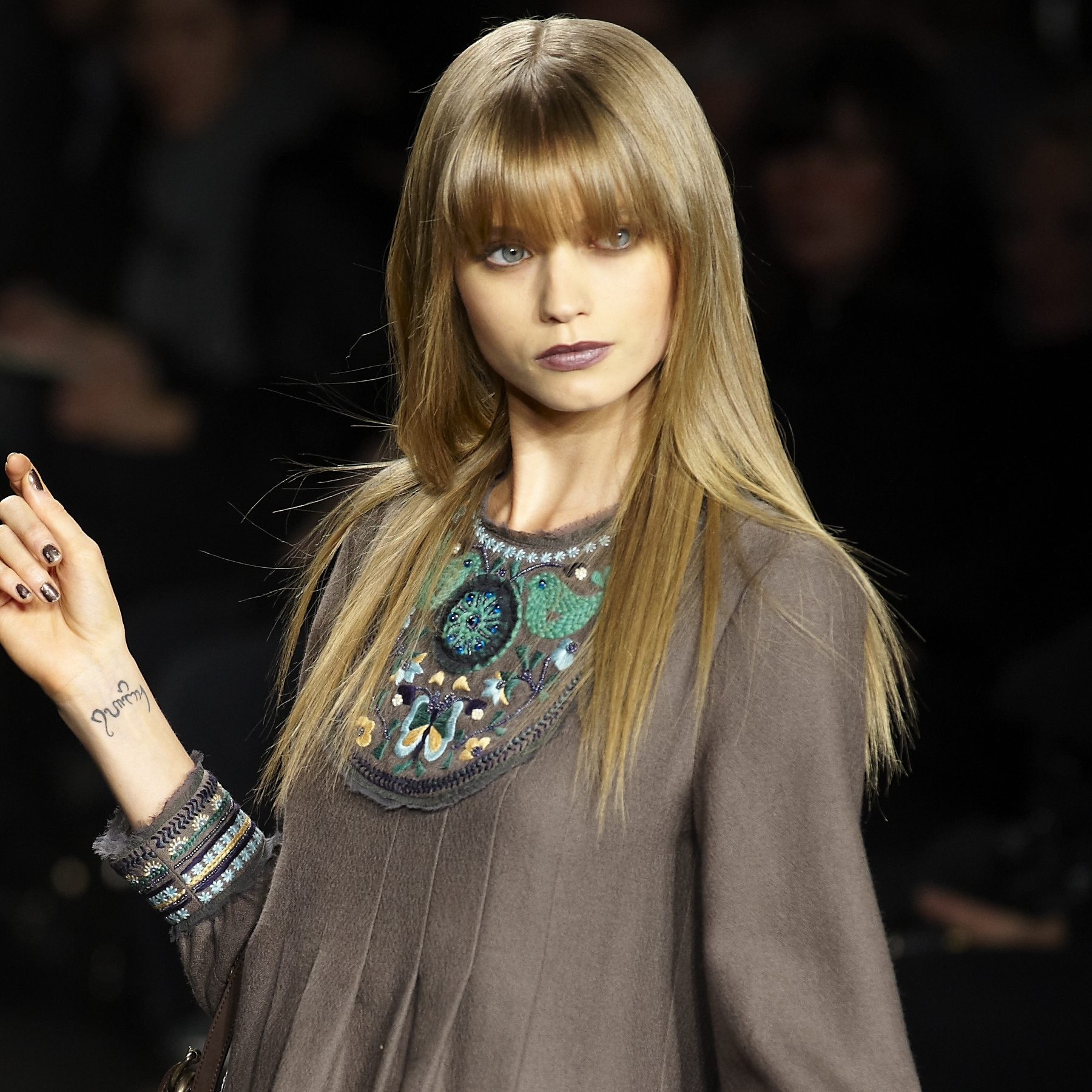
Lee in 2010

In 2010, Lee was heavily in demand for campaigns, shoots and shows. She was featured in the 2010 Pirelli Calendar photographed by Terry Richardson, and the 2011 edition photographed by Karl Lagerfeld. In March 2010, she was announced as the face of Chanel's Autumn/Winter 2010/2011 ready-to-wear ad campaign. This news came after she closed the Chanel Spring 2010 couture show, and opened the Chanel Autumn/Winter 2010/2011 ready-to-wear show. In November, for the fourth time, she became the cover model of Australian Vogue (her previous covers of the same publication were in March 2010, March 2009, and September 2008). The same year, Lee was also featured as the face of the Anna Sui FW 2010 campaign. Abbey also appeared in the lookbook of the Versace x h&m collaboration collection.

She took her own self-portrait for the new Rag & Bone Do-It-Yourself ad campaign spring 2011 along with models Sasha Pivovarova, Edita Vilkeviciute, Karolina Kurkova, Candice Swanepoel and Lily Aldridge. She earned $100,000 as an exclusive for Chanel, walking for their spring-summer collection in Paris. She skipped New York Fashion Week for London. V magazine's "The Discovery Issue" crowned Lee as the new Supermodel. The magazine called Lee "the biggest fashion export from Down Under since Elle Macpherson joined the ranks of Cindy Crawford, Claudia Schiffer, Kate Moss, Naomi Campbell and Christy Turlington."

She was on the May 2011 cover of Numero, photographed by Tom Munro.

=== 2012–2013 ===
Lee around this time began to shift away from her full time modeling career with her last runway being in 2012 where she walked for Alexander Wang and Anna Sui. During 2012, she started to scale back on modeling to pursue an acting career and spent most of the year in South Africa filming the post-apocalyptic film Mad Max: Fury Road.

Although Lee was ranked 4th at the height of her career on the Top 50 Models Women list by models.com, as of June 2013 she was 12th on the list.

=== 2014–2016 ===
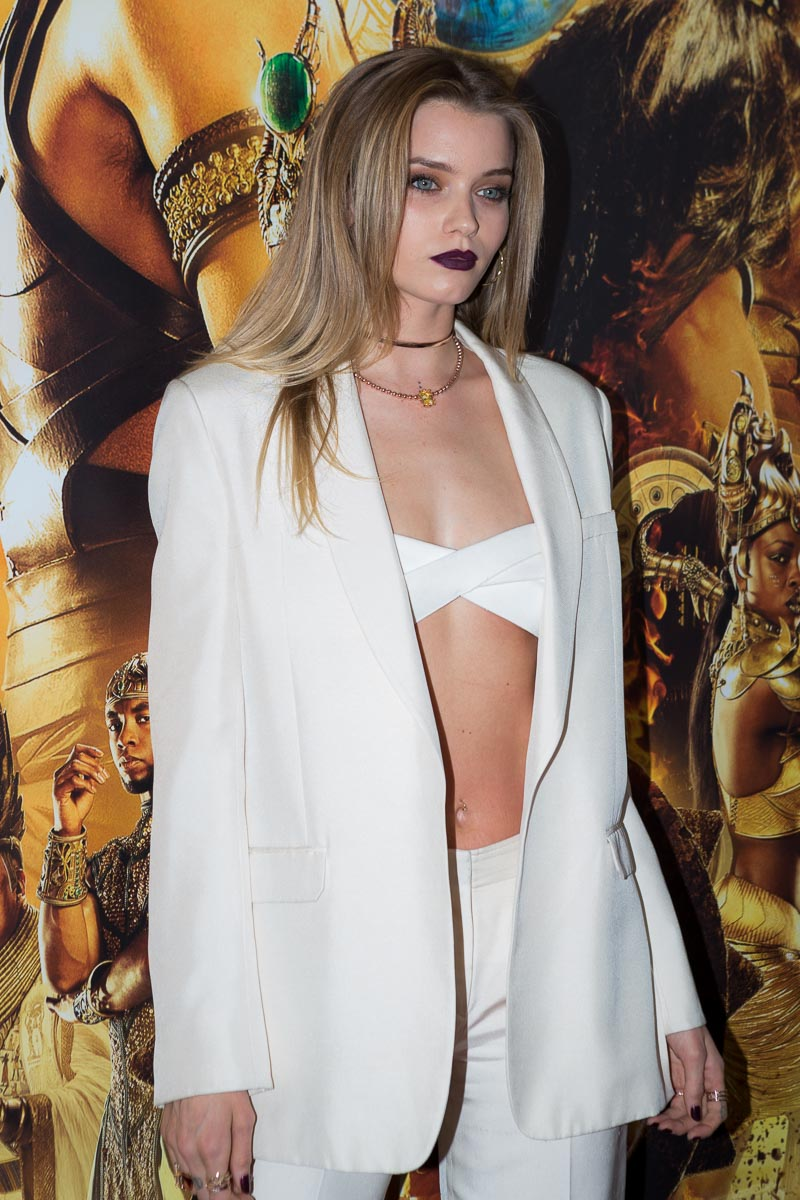
Lee in 2016

In May 2014, Lee once again appeared on the cover of Vogue Australia and starred in two editorials on the same issue, in which her acting debut was celebrated. In August 2014 Models.com moved Abbey to the Industry Icon list considering her still going presence in fashion with big fragrances contracts as Flora By Gucci and Versace's Yellow Diamond, although she was absent from runways and editorials to film Mad Max and Gods of Egypt.

Lee had a supporting role in the 2015 film Mad Max: Fury Road. By this time Lee would move to Los Angeles to pursue her acting career more seriously. In 2016, she had major roles in the films Gods of Egypt, alongside Gerard Butler, and the Nicolas Winding Refn-directed thriller The Neon Demon, with Elle Fanning. Lee stated that her history of martial arts training got her the role in Gods of Egypt.

=== 2017–2019 ===
In 2017, Lee played Tirana in the film The Dark Tower. The following year in 2018, Lee starred in the film Welcome the Stranger and she played the main character in Elizabeth Harvest, directed by Sebastian Gutierrez. and she also appeared in the 2019 film Lux Æterna.

=== 2020–present ===
In 2020, Lee played Christina Braithwhite, the daughter of the leader of a white supremacist cult, in HBO's drama horror Lovecraft Country. She told Harper's Bazaar that she was the last one cast for the show and that she researched about growing up in a cult to understand the character.

The following year, Lee played Chrystal, a sufferer of hypocalcemia, in the 2021 film Old by M. Night Shyamalan.

Lee continued her work on television in 2023, taking on the lead role of Delly West in the crime series Florida Man, opposite Edgar Ramirez. That same year, she played Carol Howe in the miniseries Waco: The Aftermath.

Lee played Marigold in the first two installments of Horizon: An American Saga series, subtitled Chapter 1 and Chapter 2, both released in 2024.

In 2026, Lee made her New York stage debut in the two-hander Blackout Songs at the MCC Theater.

== Personal life ==
Lee stated that she was a driven child with big hopes and dreams but her complicated household meant that her parents struggled to put food on the table and there was no music or art in their home. She felt that modelling made her a "disposable cog in a wheel", but that it was the ticket to her survival. Her role in Mad Max opened her eyes to how acting combines expression, sound, movement, performance and "everything she loved".

In 2015, Lee said that she was writing a semi-autobiographical film about addiction.

In a 2024 Vogue Australia feature, Lee opened up about her long-term experiences with endometriosis and chronic pain. "For a good 15 years, I was dealing with a cocktail of chronic pain and searching everywhere to get help... I was hospitalised numerous times when things got really bad, when there were flare-ups", which she hid from the public eye at the time. Her symptoms only started to improve after undergoing surgery from a specialist in the UK.

== Filmography ==
Key
| † | Denotes projects that have not yet been released |

=== Film ===
| Year | Title | Role | Notes | Ref. |
|---|---|---|---|---|
| 2015 | Mad Max: Fury Road | The Dag | | |
| 2015 | Ruben Guthrie | Zoya Houbec | | |
| 2016 | Snowbird | Theo | Short film | |
| 2016 | Gods of Egypt | Anat | | |
| 2016 | The Neon Demon | Sarah | | |
| 2016 | Office Christmas Party | Savannah | | |
| 2017 | The Dark Tower | Tirana | | |
| 2017 | 1% | Katrina | | |
| 2017 | Maverick | Maverick | Short film | |
| 2018 | Welcome the Stranger | Alice | | |
| 2018 | Elizabeth Harvest | Elizabeth | | |
| 2018 | Caprice | Holly | | |
| 2018 | To the Night | Caty | | |
| 2019 | Lux Æterna | Abbey | | |
| 2021 | The Vandal | Nurse | Short film | |
| 2021 | Old | Chrystal | | |
| 2021 | The Forgiven | Cody | | |
| 2024 | Horizon: An American Saga – Chapter 1 | Marigold | | |
| 2024 | Horizon: An American Saga – Chapter 2 | Marigold | | |
| 2024 | Killer Heat | Monique | | |
| TBA | The Engagement Party † | TBA | Filming | |
| TBA | Fear Is The Rider † | TBA | Pre-production | |

=== Television ===
| Year | Title | Role | Notes | Ref. |
|---|---|---|---|---|
| 2020 | Lovecraft Country | Christina Braithwhite | Series regular; 10 episodes | |
| 2023 | Florida Man | Delly West | Miniseries; 7 episodes | |
| 2023 | Waco: The Aftermath | Carol Howe | Miniseries; 5 episodes | |
| 2025 | Beth | Molly | Miniseries; 3 episodes | |
| 2025 | Black Rabbit | Anna | Miniseries; 6 episodes | |

== Awards and nominations ==
| Year | Award | Category | Nominated work | Result |
|---|---|---|---|---|
| 2016 | Gold Derby Awards | Best Ensemble Cast (shared with the cast) | Mad Max: Fury Road | Nominated |
| 2018 | AACTA Awards | Best Lead Actress | 1% | Nominated |
| 2019 | AFCA Award | Best Lead Actress | 1% | Nominated |
| 2021 | Critics' Choice Super Awards | Best Villain in Series | Lovecraft Country | Nominated |
| 2021 | Screen Actors Guild Awards | Outstanding Performance by an Ensemble in a Drama Series | Lovecraft Country | Nominated |
