= Ella Hunt =

English actress

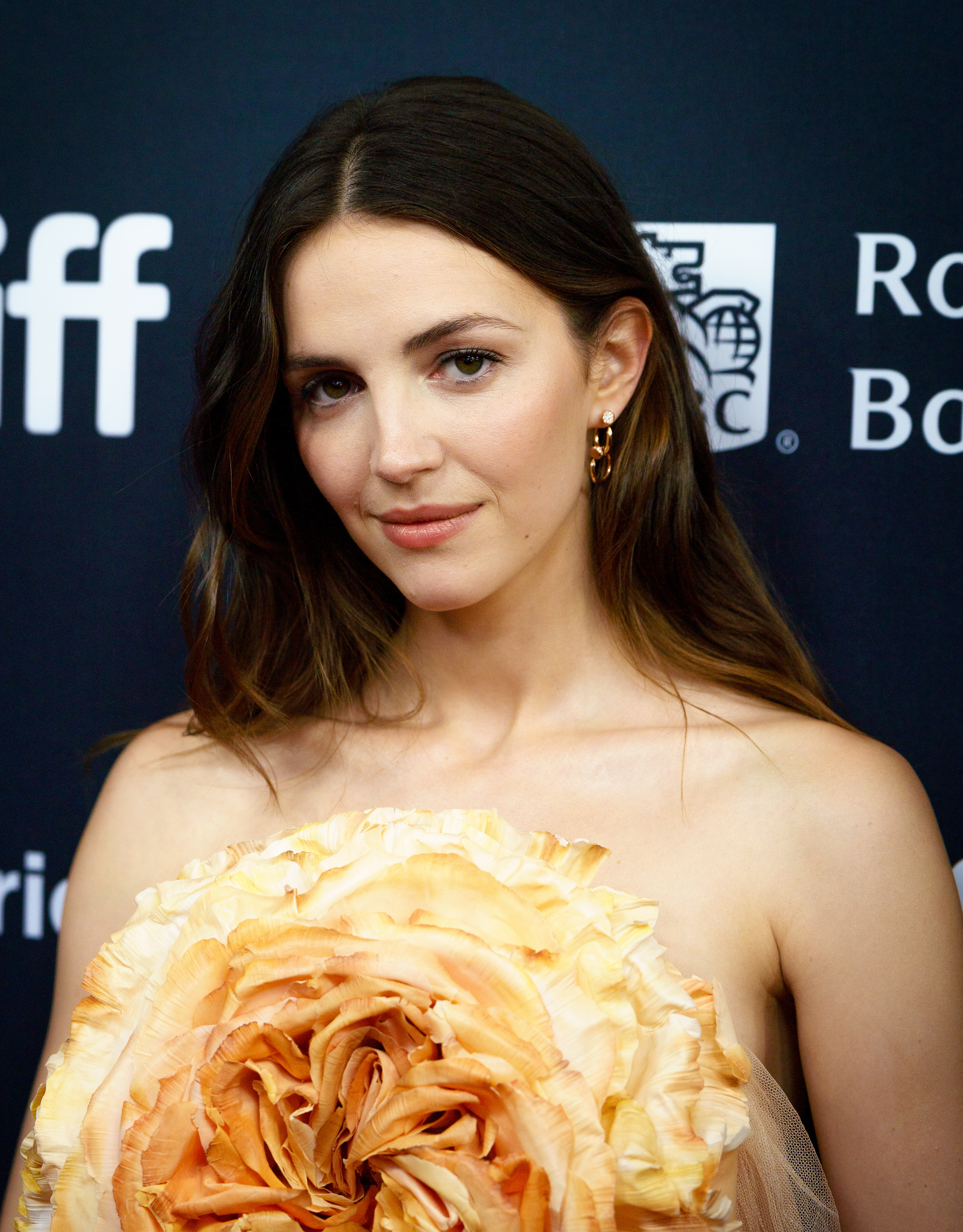
- Hunt at the 2024 Toronto International Film Festival
- Born: 29 April 1998 (age 28); Westminster, London, England
- Occupations: Actress, singer-songwriter
- Years active: 2011–present
- Spouse: Thomas "Doveman" Bartlett (m. 2026)

Ella Hunt (born 29 April 1998) is an English actress and singer-songwriter. She was nominated for a Scottish BAFTA for her performance in the film Anna and the Apocalypse (2017). On television, she had a recurring role in the ITV comedy-drama Cold Feet (2016–2017) and portrayed Sue Gilbert in the Apple TV+ series Dickinson (2019–2021).

== Early life ==
Hunt was born in London on 29 April 1998 to sculptor and actress Louise Hunt and art dealer David Grob. She grew up on a farm in Parracombe, North Devon near Barnstaple. She is of Swiss descent on one side. She has an older brother William, a younger brother Arthur, as well as three older half-siblings from her father's first marriage.

Hunt attended Millfield Preparatory School in Somerset and then Blundell's School in Tiverton. She was discovered by an agent when she was in a school production at Millfield at the age of 11.

== Career ==
Beginning as a child actress, Hunt appeared in the 2011 film Intruders, the 2012 film Les Misérables, and the 2014 independent film Robot Overlords. She made her television debut at 18 in 2016 as Ellie Marsden alongside Daisy Edgar-Jones as her twin Olivia in the ITV series Cold Feet.

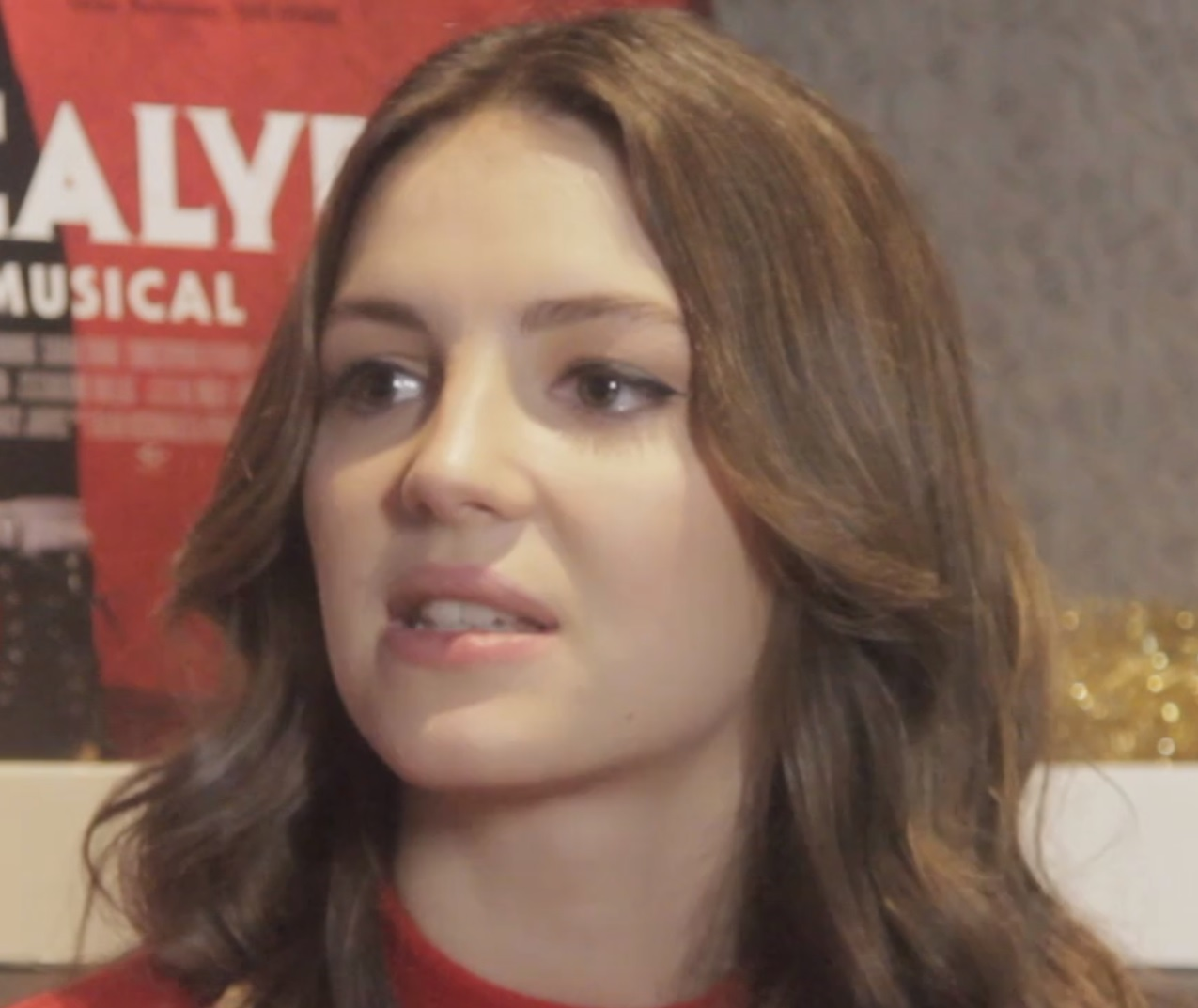
Hunt in 2018

Hunt starred as Anna Shepherd in the 2018 film Anna and the Apocalypse, which earned her a Scottish BAFTA nomination as well as an ensemble award at the Toronto After Dark Film Festival. She also appeared in the 2019 film Summer Night and starred as Kat Malone in the 2020 film Kat and the Band. In 2018, Hunt was cast as Sue Gilbert in the 2019 Apple TV+ period drama Dickinson.

In April 2020, Hunt released her first single, "Magpie". In November 2021, Hunt released the single "Holding On," followed by the EP Triptych a month later.

Hunt made her professional theatre debut as Alice in the 2022 production of Closer at the Lyric Theatre in Hammersmith alongside Jack Farthing, Sam Troughton, and Nina Toussaint-White.

In 2023, Hunt released two extended plays: Motel Blues and Fair Weather Lover.

Hunt portrayed comedienne Gilda Radner in the 2024 film Saturday Night, a comedy drama based on Saturday Night Live's first broadcast.

In 2025, she released the singles "Subway Trash" and "Mother's Chair".

She was cast for Mindy Kaling's Not Suitable for Work as AJ Pascarelli.

== Personal life ==
Hunt splits her time between Islington, London and Brooklyn Heights, New York. In March 2021, she came out as queer.

Hunt has been in a relationship with the musician Thomas "Doveman" Bartlett since at least 2018, with the two marrying in January 2026.

== Awards and nominations ==
Year	Award	Category	Nominated work	Result	Ref.
2018	Toronto After Dark Film Festival	Best Ensemble Cast	Anna and the Apocalypse	Won	
2018	British Academy Scotland Awards	Best Actress – Film	Anna and the Apocalypse	Nominated	

== Filmography ==
=== Film ===
Key
†	Denotes films that have not yet been released

Year	Title	Role	Notes
2011	Intruders	Ella Foster	
2012	Les Misérables	Turning Woman	
2014	Robot Overlords	Alexandra	
2018	Anna and the Apocalypse	Anna Shepherd	
2018	The More You Ignore Me	Alice	
2019	Summer Night	Dana	
2019	Kat and the Band	Kat Malone	
2022	Master	Cressida	
2022	Lady Chatterley's Lover	Mrs Flint	
2024	Horizon: An American Saga – Chapter 1	Juliette Chesney	
2024	Saturday Night	Gilda Radner	
2024	Horizon: An American Saga – Chapter 2	Juliette Chesney	
TBA	Horizon: An American Saga – Chapter 3 †	Juliette Chesney	Filming

=== Television ===
Year	Title	Role	Notes
2016–2017	Cold Feet	Ellie Marsden	Recurring role; 13 episodes
2017	Endeavour	Emma Carr	Episode: "Canticle"
2018	Lore	Lady Margit	Episode: "Elizabeth Bathory: Mirror, Mirror"
2019–2021	Dickinson	Sue Gilbert	Main role
2026	Not Suitable for Work	AJ Pascarelli	Main role

=== Stage ===
Year	Title	Role	Notes
2022	Closer	Alice	Lyric Theatre, London

== Music works ==
=== Extended plays ===
Title	Album details
Triptych	Released: 9 December 2021; Formats: Digital download
Motel Blues	Released: 12 September 2023; Formats: Digital download
Fair Weather Lover	Released: 17 November 2023; Formats: Digital download

=== Singles ===
Year	Title	Album
2020	"Magpie"	Non-album single
2021	"Holding On"	Triptych
2023	"Motel Blues"	Motel Blues
2023	"Fair Weather Lover"	Fair Weather Lover
2025	"Subway Trash"	—
2025	"Mother's Chair"	—
2026	"Blindspot"	
