= The Last Son =

2021 American action drama western film directed by Tim Sutton

- Promotional release poster
- Directed by: Tim Sutton
- Written by: Greg Johnson
- Produced by: Steven Luke; Todd Lundbohm; Jib Polhemus; Andre Relis
- Starring: Sam Worthington; Colson Baker; Thomas Jane; Heather Graham
- Cinematography: David Gallego
- Edited by: Kate Abernathy
- Music by: Phil Mossman
- Production companies: VMI Worldwide; Source Management + Production; Renegade Entertainment; Deano Productions
- Distributed by: Redbox Entertainment; Decal
- Release dates: September 6, 2021 (Deauville American Film Festival); December 10, 2021 (United States)
- Running time: 96 minutes
- Language: English

The Last Son is a 2021 American Western action drama film directed by Tim Sutton. It stars Sam Worthington, Colson Baker and Thomas Jane. It debuted at the Deauville American Film Festival on September 6, 2021, and officially released on December 10, 2021.

== Plot ==
Set in the late 19th century Sierra Nevada, Isaac LeMay (Worthington), has been cursed by a terrible prophecy and in order to prevent his murder from the hands of his children, he hunts down his offspring, including cold-blooded murderer and outlaw, Cal (Baker), who is his last remaining son. While U.S. Marshal Solomon (Jane) and bounty hunters track Cal down.

== Cast ==
- Sam Worthington as Isaac LeMay
- Colson Baker as Cal / Lionel
- Thomas Jane as Solomon, a U.S. Marshal who was raised by the Cheyenne, which has taught him excellent tracking skills
- Heather Graham as Anna, Cal's mother and a prostitute
- Alex Meraz as Patty
- Emily Marie Palmer as Megan

== Production ==
In 2010, the screenplay The Last Son of Isaac LeMay, written by Greg Johnson, was featured on the Black List of that year's most-liked unproduced screenplays.

The film was shot entirely on-location in Montana.

Thomas Jane and Courtney Lauren Penn of Renegade Entertainment executive produced with Redbox Entertainment, 828 Media Capital and VMI Worldwide as producers. Jessica Bennett and Sherri Hewett of VMI Worldwide co-produced.

== Reception ==
On Rotten Tomatoes, The Last Son has a 9% approval rating based on 11 reviews, with an average score of 4.7/10. Christy Lemire from RogerEbert.com gave it 2 stars saying "offers some striking visuals and a couple of compelling performances. But for the most part, this high-concept Western is too much of an empty drag to ever grab you".
