= Horizon: An American Saga =

Western film series by Kevin Costner

- Film series logo
- Starring: Kevin Costner; Various actors (see below)
- Production company: Territory Pictures
- Distributed by: New Line Cinema (through Warner Bros. Pictures)
- Running time: 181 minutes (Chapter 1); 190 minutes (Chapter 2)
- Country: United States
- Language: English
- Budget: $100 million (2 films)

Horizon: An American Saga is a series of four planned American epic Western films. It is directed, co-written, produced by, and starring Kevin Costner, from a script he co-wrote with Jon Baird and based on an original story co-written by Costner, Baird, and Mark Kasdan. The plot centers on fictional characters and takes place in pre– and post–Civil War America, and details the exploration of the American West. Depicting a twelve-year span, the films feature an ensemble cast portraying various characters and their experiences pioneering into new territory from their homes.

== Development ==
Kevin Costner began developing the script for the film series in 1988, which he based on his belief that its viewers should be inspired by the true history of America in the Old West. Costner continued to develop the script from originally co-starring two lead actors to featuring an ensemble cast. Costner explained that by further expanding the script into a series of four films, he wanted accurately to depict a 12-year history of the United States, including the impact of the American Civil War and drawing an audience into the cinema. Costner explained that the plot depicts the experiences of Native Americans, when migrant colonists moved into their territory with a justification that they had paid European salesmen for the land.

In 2003, Costner negotiated production with The Walt Disney Company. During pre-production he discovered that the studio lacked his required production budget, so he abandoned Disney. In 2014, he expanded the series into a trilogy. Development continued until Costner collaborated with Jon Baird on the script in 2012 where it developed into four films; the contents and story of which would be darker than his previous westerns. Lacking a studio, Costner invested $38 million of his money into the budget with additional funding supplied by two unnamed investors, and became determined to begin production as quickly as possible. In May 2024, Costner confirmed that the Horizon film series would be at least four installments, while explaining that the production and release schedule of the first two films was in part due to his desire to see the script realized in his life. He wanted to ensure that his son Hayes could play the character he had written for him, before outgrowing the part. Later, Costner detailed the events in his life which had delayed the films, including the impact of the COVID-19 pandemic on cinema, the death of his parents in 2021, scheduling conflicts (including a contract dispute with Paramount Pictures) and Taylor Sheridan on the final season of Yellowstone, a divorce with Christine Baumgartner and the writers'–actors' strikes of 2023. He was determined to "work...to get this thing finished".

Contrary to some reports, Costner rejected the idea that the development of the film series directly influenced his departure from the Yellowstone television series. He explained that the final season had been restructured many times and was subjected to production delays, which conflicted with the production schedule of the film series. Citing an example with the lack of completed scripts for a last season which would be split in two, Costner stated that he is open to completing additional photography to finish his role in the series. He said that when the show was being rewritten, he allowed Sheridan to read the script for the Horizon films with hopes that it could inspire, while previously offering to provide assistance in writing his character out of Yellowstone in a climactic death scene. He reportedly offered to give some time off from his films' production schedule for it but these options have never materialized.

When addressing the various festival debuts of each instalment (Cannes Film Festival for Chapter 1, and Venice Film Festival for Chapter 2) Costner expressed interest in returning to Cannes for Chapter 3. He later explained plans for additional monetary gains through licensing the series every few years through streaming and home video, regardless of their box office performance. Working with Warner Bros., plans are for each chapter to be released at four to six month intervals. The filmmaker later stated that he developed the films, with the quality of classic westerns in mind and though he has considered developing additional sequels set during contemporary times, Costner determined that the series would end with Chapter 4; expressing hopes that families would go to theaters together to view each instalment upon release.

== Films ==
Film	Release date	Director	Screenwriters	Story by	Producers	Status
Horizon: An American Saga – Chapter 1	June 28, 2024	Kevin Costner	Jon Baird & Kevin Costner	Jon Baird, Mark Kasdan & Kevin Costner	Mark Gillard, Kevin Costner & Howard Kaplan	Released
Horizon: An American Saga – Chapter 2	TBA	Kevin Costner	Jon Baird & Kevin Costner	Jon Baird, Mark Kasdan & Kevin Costner	Mark Gillard, Kevin Costner & Howard Kaplan	Completed
Horizon: An American Saga – Chapter 3	TBA	Kevin Costner	Jon Baird & Kevin Costner	Jon Baird, Mark Kasdan & Kevin Costner	Mark Gillard, Kevin Costner & Howard Kaplan	Stalled
Horizon: An American Saga – Chapter 4	TBA	Kevin Costner	Jon Baird & Kevin Costner	Jon Baird, Mark Kasdan & Kevin Costner	Mark Gillard, Kevin Costner & Howard Kaplan	In development

=== Chapter 1 (2024) ===
In January 2022, it was announced that Kevin Costner would direct his fourth feature film, from a script he co-wrote with Jon Baird. Costner is producer, with principal photography scheduled in August 2022 in Utah. This is a joint-venture production between Territory Pictures, Warner Bros. Pictures, and New Line Cinema, and Warner Bros. as the distributor. In June 2022, he stated that filming in the state has long been his goal, with scouting in the state already having taken place. Later that month, Costner revealed that his project had evolved into four "different films that all connect, so you're watching a saga of [...] storylines". Production was in the casting phase of pre-production, with photography scheduled to start later that year. Each film is intended to be 2 hours and 45 minutes in length, and Costner stated that once all the films are released, they would be compiled and re-released as a miniseries on television.

Sienna Miller, Sam Worthington, Jamie Campbell Bower, Luke Wilson, Thomas Haden Church, Jena Malone, Alejandro Edda, Tatanka Means, and Michael Rooker have been cast in various roles in the film series. In September 2022, Isabelle Fuhrman was cast in an undisclosed role. By November of that year, principal photography had wrapped. In May 2024, it was revealed that the Writers Guild of America had awarded credits for the first two films to Costner and Jon Baird as screenwriters from an original story co-written by Costner, Baird, and Mark Kasdan.

In October 2023, the official title was announced as Horizon: An American Saga – Chapter 1. The first trailer debuted, revealing a June 28, 2024 release date.

=== Chapter 2 (2024) ===
Filming began in April 2023, with Glynn Turman, Kathleen Quinlan, and Giovanni Ribisi joining the cast. Costner, Miller, Worthington, Ella Hunt, Will Patton, Wilson, Fuhrman, and Church reprised their roles from the previous film. The director-of-photography and editor returned from the previous film. Production on the second film commenced concurrently with the third, in Utah by May 2023.

In June 2023, Fuhrman confirmed that series production would be conducted back-to-back. One month following the completing of principal photography, Costner began filming the montage sequence that would feature at the end of the film to provide insight into the events of Chapter 3. In October 2023, the first trailer debuted with the film's official title reveal Horizon: An American Saga – Chapter 2, which was originally scheduled for an August 16, 2024 release. However, due to the box-office disappointment of Chapter 1, it was announced that the release date of this film had been indefinitely delayed until further notice. Chapter 2 had its world premiere at the 81st Venice International Film Festival on September 7, 2024. The film premiered in the U.S. at the Santa Barbara International Film Festival on February 7, 2025.

=== Chapter 3 ===
Production on the third film commenced concurrently with the second, in Utah by May 2023. Production of the third film was paused due to the writers' and the actors' strikes. In October of the same year following the debut of the trailer and poster for Chapter 1 and Chapter 2, it was confirmed that work on the sequels was ongoing.

In February 2024, amid post-production on the first two installments, Costner commenced building a new production company named Territory Film Studios in Utah. Production on the third and fourth film would begin later that year. By April, Costner confirmed that the scripts are complete for the four separate films. In May 2024, casting calls for background actors had commenced; while production was slated to begin later that month in St. George, Utah. Later, production started in 2023, halting in part due to the writer and actor strikes. One month following the completion of the previous installment, Costner began filming a montage sequence that features scenes from Chapter 3. Costner stated that principal photography commenced on May 13, 2024, explaining that production had been planned to commence on April 25, and was moved to May 6 to accommodate funding. In August 2024, the filmmaker stated that though the first installment underperformed at the box office, production would be completed in early 2025. At the 2024 Venice Film Festival, Costner told reporters, "I don't know how I'm gonna make [Chapter 3] right now, but I'm gonna make it."

=== Chapter 4 ===
Following completion of the previous installments, production would begin on the fourth film. In February 2024, it was announced that principal photography would start in Utah concurrently with the third film, later that year. By April of the same year, Costner announced that the scripts are completed for each installment of the film series. In August 2024, the filmmaker stated that he intended to complete production on the film in spring of 2025, immediately following the completion of filming for Chapter 3.

== Principal cast and characters ==
List indicators

This section includes characters who will appear or have appeared in the franchise in main roles.

- An empty grey cell indicates the character was not in the film, or that the character's official presence has not yet been confirmed.
- ^{C} indicates a cameo role.
- ^{V} indicates a voice-only role.

Character	Films			
Character	Horizon: An American Saga – Chapter 1	Horizon: An American Saga – Chapter 2	Horizon: An American Saga – Chapter 3	Horizon: An American Saga – Chapter 4
Hayes Ellison	Kevin Costner	Kevin Costner	Kevin Costner	Kevin Costner
Frances Kittredge	Sienna Miller	Sienna Miller	Sienna Miller	Sienna Miller
First Lt. Trent Gephardt	Sam Worthington	Sam Worthington	Sam Worthington	Sam Worthington
H. Silas Pickering	Giovanni Ribisi	Giovanni Ribisi	Giovanni Ribisi	Giovanni Ribisi
Matthew Van Weyden	Luke Wilson	Luke Wilson	Luke Wilson	
Diamond Kittredge	Isabelle Fuhrman	Isabelle Fuhrman	Isabelle Fuhrman	
Juliette Chesney	Ella Hunt	Ella Hunt	Ella Hunt	
Owen Kittredge	Will Patton	Will Patton	Will Patton	
Marigold	Abbey Lee	Abbey Lee		
Lucy "Ellen" Harvey	Jena Malone	Jena Malone		
Sgt. Major Thomas Riordan	Michael Rooker	Michael Rooker		
Col. Albert Houghton	Danny Huston	Danny Huston		
Taklishim	Tatanka Means	Tatanka Means		
Caleb Sykes	Jamie Campbell Bower			
Neron Chavez	Alejandro Edda			
Tracker	Jeff Fahey			
Abel Naughton	James Russo			
Desmarais	Angus Macfadyen			
Annie Pine		Kathleen Quinlan	Kathleen Quinlan	
TBA		Thomas Haden Church	Thomas Haden Church	
TBA		Glynn Turman	Glynn Turman	

== Additional production and crew ==
Film	Crew/detail					
Film	Composer	Cinematographer	Editor	Production company	Distributing companies	Running time
Horizon: An American Saga – Chapter 1	John Debney	J. Michael Muro	Miklos Wright	New Line Cinema, Territory Pictures	Warner Bros. Pictures	3 hrs 1 mins
Horizon: An American Saga – Chapter 2	John Debney	J. Michael Muro	Miklos Wright & Mark Sawa	New Line Cinema, Territory Pictures	Warner Bros. Pictures	3 hrs 10 mins
Horizon: An American Saga – Chapter 3	TBA	TBA	TBA	New Line Cinema, Territory Pictures	Warner Bros. Pictures	TBA
Horizon: An American Saga – Chapter 4	TBA	TBA	TBA	New Line Cinema, Territory Pictures	Warner Bros. Pictures	TBA

== Reception ==
=== Box office and financial performance ===
Film	Box office gross			Box office ranking		Home video sales gross	Gross total income	Budget	Worldwide net total income	Ref.
Film	North America	Other territories	Worldwide	All-time North America	All-time worldwide	North America	Gross total income	Budget	Worldwide net total income	Ref.
Horizon: An American Saga – Chapter 1	$29,035,702	$9,800,000	$38,835,702	4,025	5,645	—N/a	—N/a	$50,000,000	—N/a	

=== Critical and public response ===
Film	Rotten Tomatoes	Metacritic	CinemaScore
Horizon: An American Saga – Chapter 1	51% (157 reviews)	49/100 (47 reviews)	B−
Horizon: An American Saga – Chapter 2	50% (14 reviews)	49/100 (6 reviews)	—N/a
