= Horizon: An American Saga – Chapter 1 =

2024 film by Kevin Costner

- Theatrical release poster (with original release date for Chapter 2)
- Directed by: Kevin Costner
- Screenplay by: Jon Baird; Kevin Costner
- Story by: Jon Baird; Kevin Costner; Mark Kasdan
- Produced by: Kevin Costner; Howard Kaplan; Mark Gillard
- Starring: Kevin Costner; Sienna Miller; Sam Worthington; Will Patton; Jamie Campbell Bower; Giovanni Ribisi
- Cinematography: J. Michael Muro
- Edited by: Miklos Wright
- Music by: John Debney
- Production company: Territory Pictures
- Distributed by: New Line Cinema (through Warner Bros. Pictures; select territories); K5 International (International)
- Release dates: May 19, 2024 (Cannes); June 28, 2024 (United States)
- Running time: 181 minutes
- Country: United States
- Language: English
- Budget: $50 million
- Box office: $38.8 million

Horizon: An American Saga – Chapter 1 is a 2024 American epic Western film directed and produced by Kevin Costner from a screenplay he co-wrote with Jon Baird, based on an original story by the pair and Mark Kasdan. The first installment in the titular film series, it stars an ensemble cast including Costner, Sienna Miller, Sam Worthington, and Giovanni Ribisi, with Jena Malone, Abbey Lee, Michael Rooker, Danny Huston, Luke Wilson, Isabelle Fuhrman, Jeff Fahey, Will Patton, Tatanka Means, Owen Crow Shoe, Ella Hunt, and Jamie Campbell Bower co-starring in supporting roles. The film follows several characters navigating life in the Midwestern territories amid the American Civil War.

Costner conceived the idea for an epic Western film in 1988, but it languished in development hell for three decades. The film was finally confirmed in January 2022 with Costner as director, with an original plan to shoot the first two films of an envisioned four-film saga back-to-back and release them digitally on HBO Max. Much of the cast signed on in August, with filming beginning that month in Utah and lasting through November. The first two films carry a reported combined budget of $100 million, of which $38 million Costner personally funded.

Chapter 1 premiered at the 77th Cannes Film Festival on May 19, 2024, and was theatrically released in the United States on June 28. The film received mixed reviews from critics and underperformed at the box-office, grossing only $38.8 million worldwide. The film was filmed back-to-back with a sequel, Chapter 2, which had its world premiere at the 81st Venice International Film Festival, and was scheduled to be released in August 2024 but had not been released so far. Chapter 3 started filming in May 2024, while Chapter 4 is in development.

== Plot ==
In 1859, at the San Pedro Valley of Southeastern Territorial Arizona, two separate parties of surveyors mark stakes on opposite sides of the San Pedro River to outline the homestead lots of a forthcoming frontier town, Horizon. Soon after, Desmarais, a missionary, using a "Horizon"-titled single page printed pamphlet poster, seeks out Horizon and discovers all three members of the surveying parties dead at the hands of a Western Apache war band. He buries their bodies and establishes the town of Horizon.

In 1863, American homesteader Horizon faces an Apache raid led by Pionsenay, killing several residents, including Frances Kittredge's husband and son. Russell Ganz, a settlement boy, escapes on horseback to alert the Army at nearby Camp Grant, Arizona. United States Cavalry and Infantry, led by 1st Lt. Gephardt and Sgt. Major Riordan with Chief Scout Neron Chavez, assists with burials, tracks the raiders, and helps survivors. Frances and her daughter Elizabeth seek sanctuary at Camp Gallant. Orphaned Russell joins a posse led by survivor Elias Janney and a scalp-hunter to pursue the Apaches. Gephardt warns the posse against retaliating indiscriminately against uninvolved Natives, motivated by scalping profitability. Frances and Elizabeth adapt to Camp Gallant life. Gephardt's moral stance on indigenous land conflicts with Colonel Houghton's manifest destiny views. Elizabeth befriends troops at the Post, heartbroken when they are recalled to fight in the Civil War. Meanwhile, Frances and Gephardt start a romance.

Pionsenay argues with his tribal elder, Tuayeseh, over his raids on the settlers. Pionsenay believes the settlers will push them out and lead them to war against other tribes, while Tuayeseh believes in co-existence and considers reprisal for Pionsenay's actions. Pionsenay and his warband, including one of Tuayeseh's sons, voluntarily leave the tribe to continue their war against the settlers.

In Montana Territory, Lucy shoots James Sykes and flees to Wyoming Territory with her son Sam. Wounded, Mrs. Sykes orders her sons to recapture them. Now under the name Ellen Harvey, Lucy marries businessman Walter Childs. They live with Marigold, a prostitute. Marigold propositions horse trader Hayes Ellison, then returns to care for Sam while Lucy and Walter go to a land sale. Lucy is horrified to discover the buyers are the pursuing Sykes brothers. Walter is killed by Caleb, and the men kidnap Lucy. Junior sends Caleb to find Sam, who encounters Hayes. In a shootout, Hayes kills Caleb, then flees with Marigold and Sam. They settle in a railroad camp, but Marigold abandons Sam for a gambler, leaving him with a Chinese worker's family.

A wagon train led by Matthew Van Weyden travels from the West Kansas Territory along the Santa Fe Trail to Horizon. Among them are the pretentious British couple Juliette Chesney and Hugh Proctor, who sparked Van Weyden for their lack of commitment in helping out the caravan, along with the extended family of Frances's late husband. They are watched by Pawnee warriors, slowing their progress as they prepare to defend themselves. At night, Juliette catches two men peeping at her while she bathes in the drinking water. Van Weyden gives them a warning, but neither man seems inclined to listen.

Janney discovers Pionsenay as the responsible Apache at a trading post. While Janney and the Trader prevent a confrontation, the group decides to target any Indians for information. They find a Tonto Apache village, wait for the hunters to leave, then attack and kill the tribe's women, children, and elderly. The posse leaves before facing repercussions as their leader, Tracker, kills one of his own men whose failure to tie his horse nearly gave away their positions, with the impact of their actions spreading. Before the film comes to a close, there are montages of clips from Parts 2, 3, and 4 of the Saga while flyers of Horizon are printed from the press.

== Cast ==
- Kevin Costner as Hayes Ellison, a wandering horse trader
- Sienna Miller as Frances Kittredge, a mother, widowed in the attack on Horizon
- Sam Worthington as First Lieutenant Trent Gephardt, a Lieutenant in the US Army (later the Union army) who guides survivors from Horizon to Camp Grant and later becomes a love interest for Frances Kittredge
- Giovanni Ribisi as H. Silas Pickering, a mysterious printing mogul
- Michael Rooker as Sergeant Major Thomas Riordan, an aged Sergeant, mentor to Trent Gephardt, and confidant of Albert Houghton
- Danny Huston as Colonel Albert Houghton, a pragmatic and nihilistic colonel
- Jena Malone as Ellen Harvey / Lucy, a woman being pursued by her past life, attempted to kill James Sykes, and is raising Samson, a baby sought by the Sykes family, with Walter Childs and their babysitter, Marigold.
- Michael Angarano as Walter Childs, a businessman and loving husband of Ellen Harvey
- Abbey Lee as Marigold, a prostitute in Wyoming who was entrusted to babysit Samson before fleeing the town with Hayes Ellison
- Jamie Campbell Bower as Caleb Sykes, son of James Sykes, with an eagerness to demonstrate authority
- Jon Beavers as Junior Sykes, son of James Sykes, Caleb's colder, more-intimidating brother
- Owen Crow Shoe as Pionsenay, an Apache hunter to who orchestrated the attack on Horizon against Elder Tuayeseh's advice
- Tatanka Means as Taklishim
- Luke Wilson as Matthew Van Weyden, "captain of the expedition" on the Santa Fe Trail with a harsh but fair approach to discipline
- Ella Hunt as Juliette Chesney, wife of Hugh Proctor, a wealthy woman on the Santa Fe Trail whose privileged upbringing and naivety is a source of contention amongst others on the trail
- Tom Payne as Hugh Proctor, husband of Juliette Chesney, a wealthy man on the Santa Fe Trail whose gentle disposition clashes with others on the trail
- Georgia MacPhail as Elizabeth Kittredge, daughter of Frances, an innocent young girl who, along with her mother, is one of the few survivors of the attack on Horizon
- Will Patton as Owen Kittredge, a distant relative of Frances Kittredge (on her late husband's side) travelling on the Santa Fe Trail
- Isabelle Fuhrman as Diamond Kittredge, the youngest daughter of Owen Kittredge
- Jeff Fahey as Tracker, the oldest and de facto leader of a gang of mercenaries and head hunters
- Gregory Cruz as Tuayeseh, the elder of an Apache tribe
- Scott Haze as Elias Janney, a more reasonable member of Tracker's gang, fluent in aboriginal language
- Angus Macfadyen as Desmarais, a missionary who founds Horizon despite the presence of unmarked graves on the land
- Etienne Kellici as Russell Ganz, a young boy, orphaned in the attack on Horizon, taken in by Tracker's mercenary gang
- Charles Halford as James Sykes, patriarch of the Sykes family
- Dale Dickey as Mrs. Sykes
- Wasé Chief as Liluye
- Elizabeth Dennehy as Mrs. Riordan, wife of Thomas Riordan, with a fierce and violent temper
- Hayes Costner as Nathaniel Kittredge, son of Frances Kittredge, killed in the attack on Horizon
- Alejandro Edda as Neron Chavez
- Tim Guinee as James Kittredge, late husband of Frances Kittredge, killed in the attack on Horizon
- Colin Cunningham as Chisholm
- James Russo as Abel Naughton, a merchant, barkeep, and gun seller who does business with indigenous people
- Douglas Smith as Sig, a young man on the Santa Fe Trail and one of Juliette Chesney's peeping toms
- Larry Bagby as Billy Landry / Flagg James
- James Landry Hébert as Flagg
- Dalton Baker as Private Epps
- Chase Ramsey as Private Eklund
- Naomi Winders as Martha Kittredge
- Austin Archer as Virgil
- Raynor Scheine as Hermit
- David O'Hara as Bowler Hat Surveyor
- Michael Todd Behrens as Surgeon Vreeland, an alcoholic doctor in Camp Grant
- Aaron Bruderer as post office clerk Ned
- Todd Allen as Buckhout, a carriage mechanic on the Santa Fe Trail
- Ariel Llinas as Mike Connolly, a facilitator of Walter Child's business with the Sykes brothers
- Liam Bradford as an unnamed Gambler and client of Marigold's

== Production ==
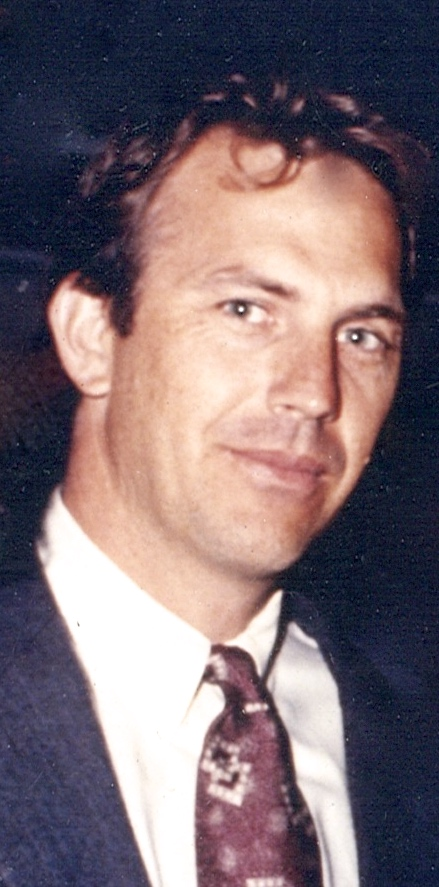
Kevin Costner in 1990, two years after conceiving Horizon

Kevin Costner first commissioned Horizon as a single, small-scale film in 1988 and later approached Walt Disney Studios with the project after the release of his 2003 film Open Range. The film almost entered production, but he and Disney were $5 million apart on the budget and plans were scrapped. He returned to the script in 2012, rewriting it with Jon Baird as four larger films. It was announced in January 2022 that Costner was set to direct and produce the film, a passion project for him, in addition to starring. It began casting in February. In April, Warner Bros. Pictures and New Line Cinema joined the production to distribute with the film set to be released on the then-named HBO Max streaming service before moving it to a theatrical release. In a June interview, Costner stated he plans to make four movies out of the premise and was looking to cast over 170 speaking roles. In order to get the films made, Costner spent $38 million of his own money.

In August, Sienna Miller, Sam Worthington, Jamie Campbell Bower, Luke Wilson, Thomas Haden Church, Jena Malone, Alejandro Edda, Tatanka Means, and Michael Rooker were cast in the film. Isabelle Fuhrman, Ella Hunt, Jeff Fahey, and Tom Payne would be among the numerous casting announcements made throughout September. In October, Will Patton, Owen Crow Shoe, and Danny Huston were added to the cast.

Filming of at least the first installment began on August 29, 2022, in southern Utah, concluding in November. Filming of the second installment began by May 2023, before concluding in the summer of that year.

== Release ==
In a May 2023 interview, Costner expressed hope to have the first film released by fall 2023. In October, it was announced the film would release in two parts, with Chapter 1 releasing on June 28, 2024, and Chapter 2 on August 16, 2024. Later that month, it was announced that K5 International, the recently relaunched international sales arm of K5 Media Group, would handle international sales on the film at the American Film Market. In April 2024, it was announced that the first part would premiere out of competition at the Cannes Film Festival on May 19, 2024, where it received a nine-minute standing ovation at the Grand Théâtre Lumière.

Horizon: An American Saga — Chapter 1 debuted on digital platforms via premium video on demand on July 16, 2024. On August 16, 2024, it was announced that Horizon: An American Saga — Chapter 1 would begin streaming on Max on August 23, 2024. The film played at the 81st Venice International Film Festival, prior to the world premiere of Chapter 2 on September 7, 2024.

== Reception ==
=== Box office ===
Horizon: An American Saga – Chapter 1 grossed $29 million in the United States and Canada, and $9.8 million in other territories, for a worldwide total of $38.8 million.

In the United States and Canada, Horizon: An American Saga – Chapter 1 was released alongside A Quiet Place: Day One, and was projected to gross $10–15 million from 3,334 theaters in its opening weekend. The film made $4.1 million on its first day, including $800,000 from Thursday night previews. It went on to debut to $11 million, finishing in third behind Inside Out 2 and A Quiet Place: Day One. In its second weekend the film made $5.4 million (a drop of 51%), finishing in sixth. Losing nearly 750 theaters in its third weekend the film made $2.4 million, finishing in seventh.

=== Critical response ===
On the review aggregator website Rotten Tomatoes, 51% of 156 critics' reviews are positive, with an average rating of 5.7/10. The website's consensus reads: "Kevin Costner doesn't lack for ambition as he sketches this frontier saga across the widest of canvases, but Horizon's first chapter proves too diffuse in scope for it to satisfy as a self-contained endeavor." Metacritic, which uses a weighted average, assigned the film a score of 49 out of 100, based on 47 critics, indicating "mixed or average" reviews. Audiences surveyed by CinemaScore gave the film an average grade of "B–" on an A+ to F scale.

Bilge Ebiri of Vulture gave a reservedly positive review, likening its incomplete nature to the 2021 film Dune: Part One and stating that "Its stately pace never feels boring, so it doesn't feel like it should have been shorter. But it also doesn't really work on its own.... And it feels impossible to judge this film, because, in some weird way, it doesn't feel like anything has really happened yet."

A review at RogerEbert.com wrote, "Even with the cataclysmic scenes of death, the first hour does little to endear these characters. They're disparate people whose connections aren't immediately clear and only become vaguely obvious toward the picture's conclusion.", and further noted, "While the first film in the possible Horizon series does well in setting up future pictures, continuing the momentum Costner gained before he left Yellowstone, this single film is a chore to sit through. It rarely gives viewers what they want: seeing Costner on the open range. It gives us few memorable characters outside of Costner: I can't remember the name of a single figure without looking at my notes." Forbes was more positive and found the film had a "great sense of place" while The Guardian found the film was "an unapologetically old-school western". The BBC website was very critical and described the film as a non-film: "It's like the tantalising pilot episode of a television series – but a pilot episode that drags on and on for three hours."

A mixed review in Esquire, however, expressed hope about the sequels. Addressing the duration and the serialization of the film, Owen Gleiberman of Variety adopted the opposite approach: "Yet I think the idea is that the design of it all will come into focus as we see Horizon: An American Saga — Chapter 2 (later this summer), and then, at some point, Chapter 3 (which is now scheduled) and maybe, if all goes according to plan, more chapters. I seriously hope not. I'm not sure how much juice there is to squeeze out of these characters, but even if there is some I don't want to see movies turn into television. Just about every Western of the studio era came in at two hours or less, and so did most of the revisionist Westerns (and some of those were complicated). There's a reason for that. It's all the time they needed." Richard Brody of The New Yorker gave the film a negative review, writing that "the inflated production of Horizon shows in its aesthetic. The dramatic format seems borrowed from television, with multiple threads jumpily interweaved, to ward off impatience. With so many balls in the air at once, the movie lacks the kind of patient observation that this story demands.

=== Accolades ===
The movie was nominated in the category of Outstanding Supporting Visual Effects in a Photoreal Feature at the 23rd Visual Effects Society Awards.

== Sequels ==
In June 2022, Costner stated he plans to make four Horizon films in total, shot back-to-back. In November 2022, Costner confirmed that the first film had been completed and that the second had been greenlit, set to be filmed in spring 2023. Production for the second film commenced in April 2023, with Glynn Turman, Kathleen Quinlan, and Giovanni Ribisi joining Costner, Miller, Worthington, Hunt, Patton, Wilson, Fuhrman, and Haden Church, who continued on from the first film. Director of photography J. Michael Muro, production designer Derek R. Hill, editor Miklos Wright, and costume designer Lisa Lovaas would also return. The second film finished production in summer 2023, with the production of the third film being paused because of the 2023 Hollywood strikes.

In May 2024, casting calls for background actors had commenced, while production was slated to begin later that month in St. George, Utah. Later, it was reported that production initially commenced in 2023, before progress halted in part due to the Hollywood strikes. One month following the completion of the previous installment, Costner began filming a montage sequence that features scenes from Chapter 3. Costner stated that principal photography commenced on May 13, 2024, explaining that production had initially been planned to commence on April 25 before being moved to May 6 in order to accommodate funding.

In June 2024, Costner stated that Giovanni Ribisi's character, H. Silas Pickering, appeared in the ending montage of the first film as a way to tease what's next in the saga, while saying that H. Silas Pickering would be a supporting character in the next film, but would become a main character in the third and fourth films, potentially as the villain of the saga.

== See also ==
- List of films and television shows about the American Civil War
- List of films split into multiple parts
