= Will Patton =

American actor (born 1954)

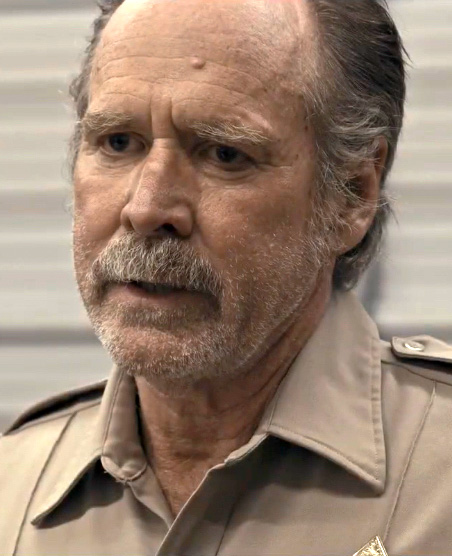
- Patton in Blood on Her Name (2019)
- Born: William Rankin Patton; June 14, 1954 (age 72); Charleston, South Carolina, U.S.
- Occupation: Actor
- Years active: 1981–present

William Rankin Patton (born June 14, 1954) is an American actor. He starred as Colonel Dan Weaver in the TNT science fiction series Falling Skies. He also appeared in the films The Client (1994), Armageddon (1998), Gone in 60 Seconds (2000), Remember the Titans (2000), The Punisher (2004), American Honey (2016), Halloween (2018), Minari (2020), and Train Dreams (2025). He appeared opposite Kevin Costner in four films: No Way Out (1987), The Postman (1997), and Horizon: An American Saga – Chapter 1 and Chapter 2 (both 2024), as well as having a guest role in seasons 3 and 4 of Costner's Paramount Network series Yellowstone (2020–2022). Patton played Deputy Marnes in season one of the 2023 TV series Silo.

Patton was nominated alongside castmates for his ensemble work in Minari and Yellowstone at the Screen Actors Guild Awards in 2020 and 2021, and won two Obie Awards for Best Actor in Sam Shepard's play Fool for Love and the Public Theater production of What Did He See?.

== Early life ==
William Rankin Patton was born on June 14, 1954 in Charleston, South Carolina, the eldest of three children. His mother’s name was Laura McClenagan Patton and his father's name was Bill Patton. Bill Patton was a playwright and acting/directing instructor who was a Lutheran minister and served as a chaplain at Duke University. Patton was raised on a farm, where his parents ran a foster home for wayward teenagers.

== Career ==
=== Theater ===
Patton had lead roles in Sam Shepard's play Fool for Love and in the Public Theater production of What Did He See?

=== Film and television ===
Will portrayed character Ox Knowles on Ryan's Hope from 1982 to 1983. Patton portrayed the evil antagonist in Desperately Seeking Susan (1985) and had a significant role in No Way Out (1987) opposite Kevin Costner, his first major film. He went on to play the role of General Bethlehem, again opposite Kevin Costner, in the 1997 The Postman. He portrayed coach Bill Yoast in Remember the Titans (2000), and FBI agent Melvin Purvis in the 1991 made-for-television film Dillinger, before a supporting actor performance in Armageddon (1998). Patton performed the role of Alan Wilson for five episodes on the TV show 24 (2009).

Patton also appeared in Silkwood (1983), The Client (1994), Copycat (1995), The Spitfire Grill (1996), Entrapment (1999), Gone in 60 Seconds (2000), The Mothman Prophecies (2002), The Punisher (2004), The Fourth Kind (2009), Brooklyn's Finest (2010), Minari (2020) and The Forever Purge (2021). Patton had a guest role in seasons 3 and 4 of Costner's Paramount Network series Yellowstone (2020-2022).

Patton portrayed the character of Sam Conroy in the film American Violet (2008). From 2011 to 2015, he starred as Colonel Weaver in the TNT sci-fi television series Falling Skies, executive-produced by Steven Spielberg. In 2018, Patton portrayed Officer Frank Hawkins in the horror reboot of Halloween, and reprised his role in its two Halloween sequels, Halloween Kills (2021) and Halloween Ends (2022). He also portrayed Avery Sunderland in the DC Universe TV series Swamp Thing in 2019.

Patton's Yellowstone costar, Kevin Costner, identified Patton in May 2023 as an actor that will join him again, this time in Horizon, a "Civil War saga" based on four scripts which Costner intends to write, direct, and act in, covering a 15-year period of "pre- and post-Civil War... settlement of the American west".

=== Audiobooks ===
Patton has recorded more than forty-five audiobooks, including works by Stephen King, James Lee Burke, and Al Gore.

== Critical reception ==
Patton's acting work has been noted, critically and by colleagues. Speaking with regard to Patton's presence in the Yellowstone cast, executive producer and fellow cast member Kevin Costner "praise[d]" Patton as "very dynamic in his own way, formidable and detailed", adding that he was "a fantastic actor" and that "[i]t was good to see Will on the set." Some of his best rated films are The Scent of Rain and Lightning (2017) and Minari (2020). As to his participation in television he has overall positive reviews especially in shows like Swamp Thing (2019).

== Awards and recognition ==
Patton won two Obie Awards for best actor for his theatrical performances in Fool for Love and What Did He See?. He was nominated for the Saturn Award for Best Supporting Actor for his work in The Postman (1997).

More recently, Patton was nominated for Outstanding Performance by a Cast in a Motion Picture at the 27th SAG Awards alongside his fellow cast members, for their work in Minari (2020), and for Outstanding Performance by an Ensemble in a Drama Series at the 28th SAG Awards alongside his fellow cast members, for their work in Yellowstone (2021).

== Filmography ==
=== Film ===
| Year | Title | Role | Notes |
|---|---|---|---|
| 1983 | Variety | Mark | |
| 1983 | King Blank | Bar Customer | |
| 1983 | Silkwood | Joe | |
| 1985 | The Beniker Gang | Forest Ranger | |
| 1985 | Desperately Seeking Susan | Wayne Nolan | |
| 1985 | After Hours | Horst | |
| 1986 | Chinese Boxes | Lang Marsh | |
| 1986 | Belizaire the Cajun | Matthew Perry | |
| 1987 | No Way Out | Scott Pritchard | |
| 1988 | Wildfire | Mike | |
| 1988 | Stars and Bars | Duane Gage | |
| 1989 | Signs of Life | Mr. Coughlin | |
| 1990 | Everybody Wins | Jerry | |
| 1990 | A Shock to the System | Lieutenant Laker | |
| 1990 | Bright Angel | Woody | Uncredited |
| 1991 | The Rapture | Deputy Foster | |
| 1991 | Cold Heaven | Father Niles | |
| 1992 | In the Soup | 'Skippy' | |
| 1993 | The Paint Job | Wesley | |
| 1993 | Midnight Edition | Jack Travers | |
| 1993 | Romeo Is Bleeding | Martie | |
| 1994 | Tollbooth | Dash Pepper | |
| 1994 | Natural Causes | Michael Murphy | |
| 1994 | Judicial Consent | Alan Warwick | |
| 1994 | The Client | Sergeant Hardy | |
| 1994 | The Puppet Masters | Dr. Graves | |
| 1995 | Copycat | Inspector Nicoletti | |
| 1996 | Plain Pleasures | | |
| 1996 | The Spitfire Grill | Nahum Goddard | |
| 1996 | Fled | Detective Matthew 'Gib' Gibson | |
| 1997 | Inventing the Abbotts | Lloyd Abbott | |
| 1997 | Hounddogg | | |
| 1997 | This World, Then the Fireworks | Lieutenant Morgan | |
| 1997 | The Postman | General Bethlehem | Nominated — Saturn Award for Best Supporting Actor |
| 1998 | OK Garage | Sean | |
| 1998 | Armageddon | Charles 'Chick' Chapple | |
| 1998 | I Woke Up Early the Day I Died | Preacher | |
| 1999 | Breakfast of Champions | 'Moe' The Truck Driver | |
| 1999 | Entrapment | Hector Cruz | |
| 1999 | Jesus' Son | John Smith | |
| 2000 | Gone in 60 Seconds | Atley Jackson | |
| 2000 | Trixie | W. 'Red' Rafferty | |
| 2000 | Remember the Titans | Coach Bill Yoast | |
| 2002 | The Mothman Prophecies | Gordon Smallwood | |
| 2004 | The Punisher | Quentin Glass | |
| 2006 | Road House 2 | Nate Tanner | |
| 2007 | Code Name: The Cleaner | Riley | |
| 2007 | A Mighty Heart | DSS Special Agent Randall Bennett | |
| 2007 | The List | Michael Harriston | |
| 2007 | Dog Days of Summer | Eli Cottonmouth | |
| 2008 | Wendy and Lucy | The Mechanic | |
| 2008 | American Violet | Sam Conroy | |
| 2008 | Lucky Days | J.C. | |
| 2009 | Barbarian Princess | Sanford B. Dole | |
| 2009 | Looking at Animals | Raymond | |
| 2009 | The Canyon | Henry | |
| 2009 | The Fourth Kind | Sheriff August | |
| 2009 | Waking Madison | Madison's Father | |
| 2009 | The Loss of a Teardrop Diamond | Old Man Dobyne | |
| 2010 | Brooklyn's Finest | Lieutenant Bill Hobarts | |
| 2010 | Meek's Cutoff | Solomon Tetherow | |
| 2010 | Knucklehead | Vic Sullivan | |
| 2012 | The Girl | Tommy | |
| 2012 | Abigail Harm | The Visitor / Narrator | |
| 2014 | The November Man | Perry Weinstein | |
| 2016 | American Honey | Backseat Cowboy | |
| 2017 | The Scent of Rain and Lightning | Senior | |
| 2017 | Megan Leavey | Jim | |
| 2018 | Boarding School | Dr. Sherman | |
| 2018 | An Actor Prepares | Wisdom | |
| 2018 | Halloween | Deputy Frank Hawkins | |
| 2019 | Blood on Her Name | Richard Tiller | |
| 2019 | Hammer | Stephen Davis | |
| 2019 | Radioflash | Frank | |
| 2020 | Minari | Paul | Nominated — Screen Actors Guild Award for Outstanding Performance by a Cast in a Motion Picture |
| 2021 | The Devil Below | Schuttmann | |
| 2021 | The Forever Purge | Caleb Tucker | |
| 2021 | Halloween Kills | Deputy Frank Hawkins | |
| 2022 | Halloween Ends | Deputy Frank Hawkins | |
| 2023 | Janet Planet | Wayne | |
| 2024 | Horizon: An American Saga – Chapter 1 | Owen Kittredge | |
| 2024 | Horizon: An American Saga – Chapter 2 | Owen Kittredge | |
| 2025 | Train Dreams | Narrator (voice) | |
| 2026 | You Can't Win | Foot and A Half George | Filmed in 2012. |
| TBA | Horizon: An American Saga – Chapter 3 | Owen Kittredge | Filming |

=== Television ===
| Year | Title | Role | Notes |
|---|---|---|---|
| 1981 | Kent State | Peter | Television film |
| 1982 | CBS Library | Ben Moody | Episode: "Robbers, Rooftops and Witches" |
| 1982–1983 | Ryan's Hope | 'Ox' Knowles | Contract role |
| 1984–1985 | Search for Tomorrow | Kentucky Bluebird | 26 episodes |
| 1985 | The Equalizer | Officer Nick Braxton | Episode: "Lady Cop" |
| 1987 | A Gathering of Old Men | Lou Dimes | Television film |
| 1990 | Nasty Boys | Raymond Batiste | Episode: "Flesh and Blood" |
| 1991 | Dillinger | FBI Agent Melvin Purvis | Television film |
| 1991 | Deadly Desire | Giles Menteer | Television film |
| 1992 | Lincoln and the War Within | Ward Lamon | Television film |
| 1992 | In the Deep Woods | Eric Gaines | Television film |
| 1992 | A Child Lost Forever: The Jerry Sherwood Story | Frank Maxwell | Television film |
| 1992 | Roseanne | Grant | Episode: "Of Ice and Men" |
| 1993 | Taking the Heat | Hadley | Television film |
| 1995–1997 | VR.5 | Dr. Frank Morgan | 5 episodes |
| 1997 | The Protector | Jeff | Unknown episodes |
| 2001–2003 | The Agency | Jackson Haisley | Main role |
| 2004 | Family Sins | Philip Rothman | Television film |
| 2004 | The Last Ride | Aaron Purnell | Television film |
| 2005 | Into the West | James Fletcher | Episode: "Wheel to the Stars" |
| 2006–2007 | Numbers | Lieutenant Gary Walker | 4 episodes |
| 2009 | 24 | Alan Wilson | 5 episodes |
| 2009 | American Experience | John Wilkes Booth (voice) | Episodes: "The Assassination of Abraham Lincoln" |
| 2010 | CSI: Crime Scene Investigation | Craig Haliday | Episode: "Unshockable" |
| 2011–2015 | Falling Skies | Captain Dan Weaver | Main role |
| 2016 | The Good Wife | Mike Tascioni | 4 episodes |
| 2017 | Shots Fired | Sheriff Daniel Platt | Main role |
| 2019 | Swamp Thing | Avery Sunderland | Main role |
| 2020–2022 | Yellowstone | Garrett Randall | Recurring role; nominated — Screen Actors Guild Award for Outstanding Performance by an Ensemble in a Drama Series |
| 2022–2024 | Outer Range | Wayne Tillerson | Main role |
| 2023 | Silo | Deputy Marnes | 4 episodes |
| TBA | The Magnificent Seven | Cyrus T. Clemons | Upcoming series |
| TBA | The Murder of JonBenét Ramsey | Lou Smith | Upcoming series |

== Voice work ==
=== Audio books ===
| Title | Author | Year | Notes |
|---|---|---|---|
| Lonesome Dove | Larry McMurtry | 2025 | |
| You Like It Darker | Stephen King | 2024 | |
| The Demon of Unrest | Erik Larson | 2024 | |
| The Stars at Noon | Denis Johnson | 2023 | |
| Flags on the Bayou | James Lee Burke | 2023 | |
| Every Cloak Rolled in Blood | James Lee Burke | 2022 | |
| Greywaren | Maggie Stiefvater | 2022 | |
| Another Kind of Eden | James Lee Burke | 2021 | |
| Mister Impossible | Maggie Stiefvater | 2021 | |
| If It Bleeds | Stephen King | 2020 | |
| Tales of Ordinary Madness | Charles Bukowski | 2017 | |
| Call Down The Hawk | Maggie Stiefvater | 2019 | |
| The Outsider | Stephen King | 2018 | |
| Robicheaux | James Lee Burke | 2018 | |
| The Mist | Stephen King | 2017 | |
| Killers of the Flower Moon | David Grann | 2017 | |
| The Jealous Kind | James Lee Burke | 2017 | |
| End of Watch | Stephen King | 2016 | |
| The Raven King | Maggie Stiefvater | 2016 | |
| House of the Rising Sun | James Lee Burke | 2015 | |
| Finders Keepers | Stephen King | 2015 | |
| Blue Lily, Lily Blue | Maggie Stiefvater | 2014 | |
| Mr. Mercedes | Stephen King | 2014 | |
| Doctor Sleep | Stephen King | 2013 | |
| The Dream Thieves | Maggie Stiefvater | 2013 | |
| The Son | Philipp Meyer | 2013 | |
| My Cross to Bear | Gregg Allman | 2012 | |
| The Raven Boys | Maggie Stiefvater | 2012 | |
| Creole Belle | James Lee Burke | 2012 | |
| Train Dreams | Denis Johnson | 2011 | |
| Deliverance | James Dickey | 2011 | |
| Feast Day of Fools | James Lee Burke | 2011 | |
| The Glass Rainbow | James Lee Burke | 2010 | |
| Alas, Babylon | Pat Frank | 2010 | |
| Light in August | William Faulkner | 2010 | |
| Nobody Move | Denis Johnson | 2009 | |
| Chasing Lincoln's Killer | James L. Swanson | 2009 | |
| Jesus' Son | Denis Johnson | 2009 | |
| Swan Peak | James Lee Burke | 2008 | |
| On the Road | Jack Kerouac | 2007 | |
| The Tin Roof Blowdown | James Lee Burke | 2007 | |
| The Assault on Reason | Al Gore | 2007 | |
| Fine Just the Way It Is: Wyoming Stories 3 | Annie Proulx | 2008 | |
| Tree of Smoke | Denis Johnson | 2007 | |
| Last Car to Elysian Fields | James Lee Burke | 2007 | |
| Thirteen Moons | Charles Frazier | 2006 | |
| Pegasus Descending | James Lee Burke | 2006 | |
| Crusader's Cross | James Lee Burke | 2006 | |
| Jolie Blon's Bounce | James Lee Burke | 2006 | |
| The President Has Been Shot! | James L. Swanson | 2006 | |
| The Thomas Berryman Number | James Patterson | 2006 | |
| To Have and Have Not | Ernest Hemingway | 2006 | |
| A Dave Robicheaux Audio Collection | James Lee Burke | 2006 | |
| A Stained White Radiance (#5) | | | |
| In the Electric Mist with Confederate Dead (#6) | | | |
| Dixie City Jam (#7) | | | |
| Burning Angel (#8) | | | |
| Cadillac Jukebox (#9) | | | |
| When Zachary Beaver Came to Town | Kimberly Willis Holt | 2006 | |
| Cosmopolis | Don DeLillo | 2005 | |
| In the Moon of Red Ponies | James Lee Burke | 2004 | |
| Cimarron Rose | James Lee Burke | 2004 | |
| White Doves at Morning | James Lee Burke | 2003 | |
| Bitterroot | James Lee Burke | 2001 | |
| Cadillac Jukebox | James Lee Burke | 2001 | |
| Purple Cane Road | James Lee Burke | 2000 | |
| Boone's Lick | Larry McMurtry | 2000 | |
| Burning Angel | James Lee Burke | 1999 | |
| Heaven's Prisoners | James Lee Burke | 1999 | |
| Heartwood | James Lee Burke | 1999 | |
| Primal Fear | William Diehl | 1999 | |
| Dixie City Jam | James Lee Burke | 1999 | |
| A Stained White Radiance | James Lee Burke | 1998 | |
| Sunset Limited | James Lee Burke | 1998 | |
| The Sea-Wolf | Jack London | 1997 | |
| Dead Man's Walk | Larry McMurtry | 1996 | |
| Dirty White Boys | Stephen Hunter | 1995 | |
| The Water Is Wide | Pat Conroy | 1995 | |
| The Fermata | Nicholson Baker | 1995 | |
| Gump and Co. | Winston Groom | 1995 | |
| Gone South | Robert R. McCammon | 1994 | |
| Lila – An Inquiry into Morals | Robert M. Pirsig | 1991 | |
| The Neon Rain | James Lee Burke | 1987 | |
| The Lost Get-Back Boogie | James Lee Burke | 1986 | |
