= Horizon: An American Saga – Chapter 2 =

2024 film by Kevin Costner

- Theatrical release poster with original release date
- Directed by: Kevin Costner
- Screenplay by: Jon Baird; Kevin Costner
- Story by: Jon Baird; Kevin Costner; Mark Kasdan
- Produced by: Kevin Costner; Howard Kaplan; Mark Gillard
- Starring: Kevin Costner; Sienna Miller; Sam Worthington; Giovanni Ribisi
- Cinematography: J. Michael Muro
- Edited by: Miklos Wright
- Music by: John Debney
- Production company: Territory Pictures
- Distributed by: New Line Cinema (through Warner Bros. Pictures; select territories); K5 International (International)
- Release date: September 7, 2024 (Venice)
- Running time: 190 minutes
- Country: United States
- Language: English
- Budget: $50 million

Horizon: An American Saga – Chapter 2 is a 2024 American epic Western film directed and produced by as well as starring Kevin Costner from a screenplay he co-wrote with Jon Baird, based on an original story he co-authored with Baird and Mark Kasdan. It is the second installment in the titular film series and direct sequel to Horizon: An American Saga – Chapter 1. Costner reprises his role alongside most of the other cast from the previous film consisting of Sienna Miller, Sam Worthington, and Giovanni Ribisi.

Chapter 2 had its world premiere at the 81st Venice International Film Festival on September 7, 2024, and screened at the 40th Santa Barbara International Film Festival on February 7, 2025. Due to the box-office disappointment of Chapter 1, it was announced that the release date of this film had been indefinitely delayed until further notice.

Chapter 3 is in production, and Chapter 4 is in development.

== Premise ==
The continuation of one story of the settlement of the American West. It follows the further adventures of characters first featured in Horizon: An American Saga – Chapter 1.

== Cast ==
- Kevin Costner as Hayes Ellison
- Sienna Miller as Frances Kittredge
- Sam Worthington as First Lt. Trent Gephardt
- Giovanni Ribisi as H. Silas Pickering
- Danny Huston as Col. Albert Houghton
- Jena Malone as Ellen Harvey/Lucy
- Luke Wilson as Matthew Van Weyden
- Ella Hunt as Juliette Chesney
- Abbey Lee as Marigold
- Will Patton as Owen Kittredge
- Isabelle Fuhrman as Diamond Kittredge
- Kathleen Quinlan as Annie Pine
- Glynn Turman
- Reed Birney as Henry Bennett
- Chad Lindberg as Travis
- Owen Crow Shoe as Pionsenay
- Jon Beavers as Junior Sykes
- Tatanka Means as Taklishim
- Tim Guinee as James Kittredge
- Colin Cunningham as Chisholm
- Scott Haze as Elias Janney
- Tom Payne as Hugh Proctor
- Michael Rooker as Sgt. Major Thomas Riordan
- Georgia MacPhail as Elizabeth Kittredge
- Phoebe Ho as Yuan Hong
- Jim Lau as Mr. Hong
- Cici Lau as Mrs. Hong
- Aidan McCann as Georgie
- Charles Baker as Drifter
- Lyndell Chee as Salish Scout

== Production ==
Kevin Costner first commissioned Horizon as a single film in 1988, and later approached Walt Disney Studios with the project after the release of his 2003 film Open Range. It was announced in January 2022 that Costner was set to direct and produce the film, a passion project for him, in addition to starring. It began casting in February. In April, Warner Bros. Pictures and New Line Cinema joined the production to distribute. In a June interview, Costner stated he plans to make four movies out of the premise, and was looking to cast over 170 speaking roles.

In November 2022, Costner confirmed that the first film had been completed, and that the second had been greenlit, set to be filmed in Spring 2023. Production for the second film commenced by April 2023, with Glynn Turman, Kathleen Quinlan and Giovanni Ribisi joining Costner, Miller, Worthington, Hunt, Patton, Wilson, Fuhrman and Haden Church, who continue on from the first film. Director of photography J. Michael Muro, production designer Derek R. Hill, editor Miklos Wright and costume designer Lisa Lovaas would also return. Filming of the second installment began by May 2023, before concluding in the summer of that year.

== Lawsuits ==
In May 2025, Devyn LaBella, who was the lead stunt double, sued Costner and producers over an unscripted rape scene.

In addition to this lawsuit, Costner's loan-out firm is in a standoff with distributor New Line regarding a co-financing agreement.

Later that month, the United Costume Corporation filed a lawsuit for a breach of contract against the same loan-out firm. It seeks roughly $350,000 for unpaid costume fees across Horizon: An American Saga — Chapter 1 and its sequel.

== Release ==
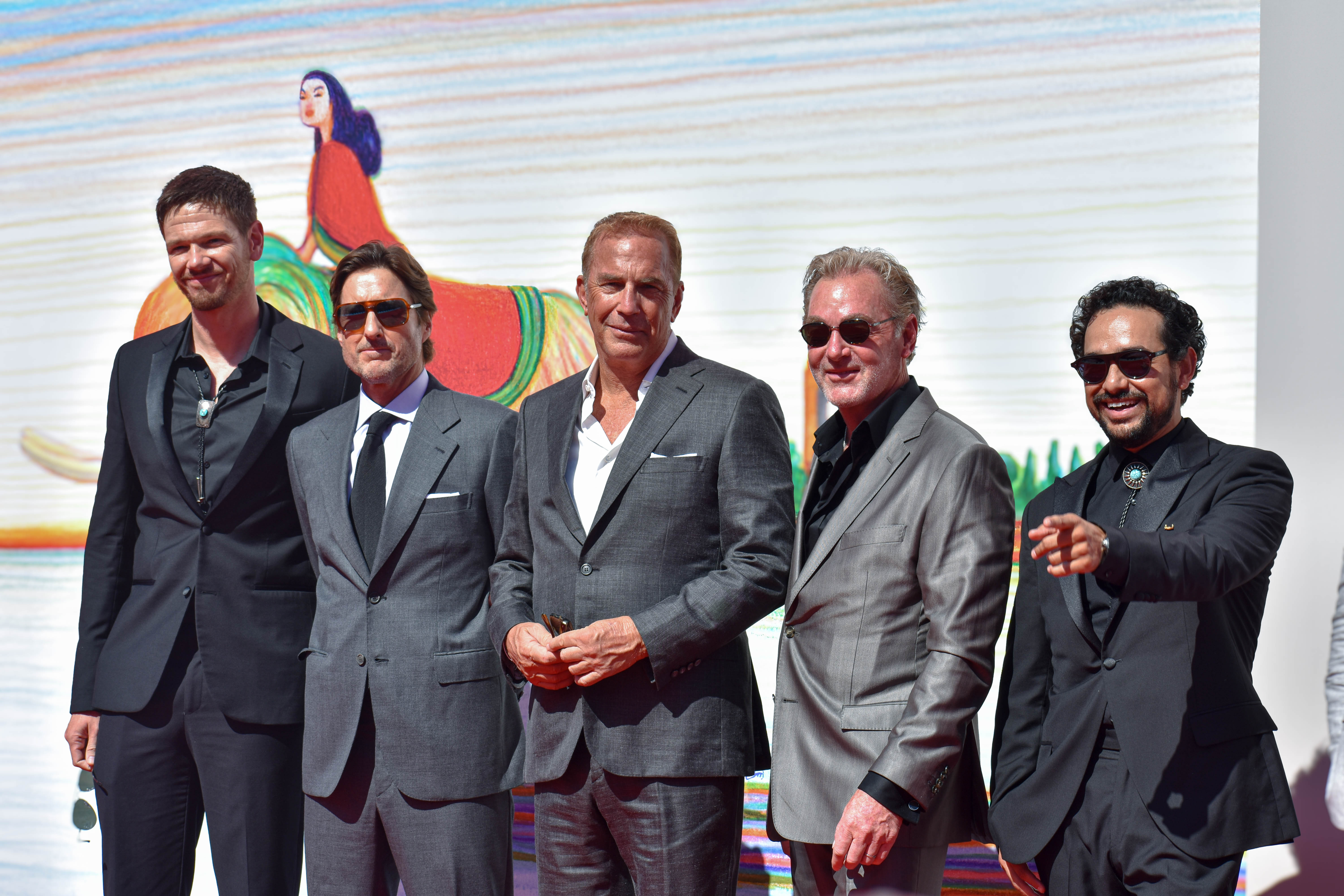
Cast and crew at 81st Venice International Film Festival

Horizon: An American Saga – Chapter 2 was originally scheduled to be released in the United States on August 16, 2024, but due to the financial underperformance of Chapter 1, New Line Cinema removed the project from its original date, and has been indefinitely delayed until further notice. The film had its world premiere at the 81st Venice International Film Festival on September 7, 2024, and later screened at the 40th Santa Barbara International Film Festival on February 7, 2025.

== Reception ==
On the review aggregator website Rotten Tomatoes, 50% of 14 critics' reviews are positive, with an average rating of 5.10/10. Metacritic, which uses a weighted average, assigned the film a score of 49 out of 100, based on six critics, indicating "mixed or average" reviews.

== Sequels ==
In June 2022, Costner stated he planned to make four Horizon films in total, shot back-to-back. In May 2024, casting calls for background actors for Chapter 3 had commenced; while production was slated to begin later that month in St. George, Utah. Later, it was reported that production initially commenced in 2023, before progress halted in part due to the 2023 Hollywood labor disputes. One month following the completion of the previous installment, Costner began filming a montage sequence that features scenes from Chapter 3. Costner stated that principal photography commenced on May 13, 2024, explaining that production had initially been planned to commence on April 25, before being moved to May 6 in order to accommodate funding. In August 2024, the filmmaker stated that though the first installment underperformed at the box office, production on the third would be completed in early 2025 when production on the fourth would begin. At the 2024 Venice Film Festival, Costner told reporters, "I don't know how I'm gonna make [Chapter 3] right now, but I'm gonna make it."

== See also ==
- List of films and television shows about the American Civil War
- List of films split into multiple parts
