= Giovanni Ribisi =

American actor (born 1974)

- Ribisi at the 2026 Toronto International Film Festival
- Born: Antonino Giovanni Ribisi; December 17, 1974 (age 51); Los Angeles, California, U.S.
- Other name: Vonni Ribisi
- Occupation: Actor
- Years active: 1985–present
- Spouses: Mariah O'Brien (m. 1997; div. 2001); Agyness Deyn (m. 2012; div. 2015)
- Partner(s): Cat Power (2007–2012); Emily Ward (2018–present)
- Children: 3
- Relatives: Marissa Ribisi (twin sister)

Antonino Giovanni Ribisi (Italian: [antoˈniːno riˈbiːzi]; born December 17, 1974) is an American actor. He has appeared in the films That Thing You Do! (1996), Saving Private Ryan (1998), Gone in 60 Seconds (2000), Heaven (2002), Flight of the Phoenix (2004), Perfect Stranger (2007), Avatar (2009), Public Enemies (2009), The Rum Diary (2011), Gangster Squad (2013), A Million Ways to Die in the West (2014), and Papa: Hemingway in Cuba (2015). He had starring roles in the TV sitcom Dads (2013–2014) and the crime drama series Sneaky Pete (2015–2019). He also had recurring roles in television series such as The Wonder Years (1992–1993), Friends (1995–1998, 2003), and My Name Is Earl (2005–2008).

== Early life ==
Ribisi was born in Los Angeles, California on December 17, 1974. His father, Al Ribisi, is a musician who was the keyboard player of People! and his mother, Gay, is a talent manager. He is the twin brother of actress Marissa Ribisi and the older brother of voice actress Gina Ribisi.

== Career ==
Ribisi began acting when he was young, appearing in the 1980s sitcom My Two Dads and in several films during the 1990s. He had a recurring role in the 1990s sitcom Friends, playing the half brother of Phoebe Buffay. For My Name Is Earl, he was nominated for the Primetime Emmy Award for Outstanding Guest Actor in a Comedy Series.

Ribisi starred in the Avatar franchise as Parker Selfridge and Horizon: An American Saga as H. Silas Pickering.

In 2016, Ribisi directed a music video for "Siberian Nights", the third single from Ash & Ice by The Kills.

Ribisi starred as Marius/"Pete" in the Amazon series Sneaky Pete over its three seasons. He debuted as a cinematographer with the 2024 independent film Strange Darling.

Ribisi will play Angelo Dundee, who trained Ali during various parts of his career as a boxer in Amazon Prime Video‘s new Muhammad Ali limited series The Greatest (2026).

== Personal life ==
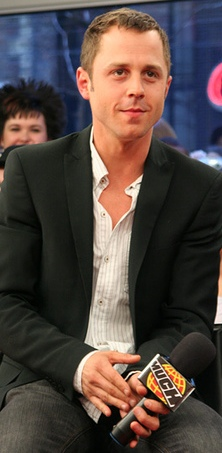
Ribisi in 2007

Ribisi married actress Mariah O'Brien in 1997 and their daughter was born the same year. The couple divorced in 2001. In 2007, he began a relationship with singer-songwriter Cat Power. The couple lived together for five years before ending their relationship in 2012. Ribisi married English model Agyness Deyn on June 16, 2012, and filed for divorce in January 2015. He announced the birth of his fraternal twins with girlfriend Emily Ward in December 2018.

Ribisi is an active Scientologist. He participated in the gala opening of Scientology's Psychiatry: An Industry of Death museum in December 2005.

Ribisi collects cinematography devices such as VistaVision, which was borrowed for the filming of One Battle After Another.

== Filmography ==
Key
†	Denotes films that have not yet been released

=== Film ===
Year	Title	Role	Notes
1995	Mind Ripper	Scott Stockton	Direct-to-video
1996	The Grave	Wex	
1996	That Thing You Do!	Chad	
1996	SubUrbia	Jeff	
1997	Lost Highway	Steve V.	
1997	First Love, Last Rites	Joey	
1997	The Postman	Bandit 20	
1998	Some Girl	Jason	Written by sister Marissa Ribisi
1998	Phoenix	Joey Schneider	
1998	Saving Private Ryan	T-4 Medic Irwin Wade	
1999	The Other Sister	Daniel McMahon	
1999	The Mod Squad	Peter	
1999	The Virgin Suicides	Narrator (voice)	
1999	It's the Rage	Sidney	
2000	Boiler Room	Seth Davis	
2000	Gone in 60 Seconds	Kip Raines	
2000	The Gift	Buddy Cole	
2001	According to Spencer	Louis	
2002	Heaven	Filippo	
2003	Masked and Anonymous	Soldier	
2003	Basic	Kendall	
2003	Lost in Translation	John	
2003	I Love Your Work	Gray Evans	
2003	Cold Mountain	Junior	
2004	Love's Brother	Angelo Donnini	
2004	Sky Captain and the World of Tomorrow	Dexter "Dex" Dearborn	
2004	Flight of the Phoenix	Elliott	
2005	The Big White	Ted	
2006	10th & Wolf	Joey	
2006	The Dog Problem	Solo	
2006	The Dead Girl	Rudy	
2007	Perfect Stranger	Miles Haley	
2007	Gardener of Eden	Vic	
2008	Spirit of the Forest	Cebolo (voice)	English dub
2009	Middle Men	Wayne Beering	
2009	Public Enemies	Alvin Karpis	
2009	Avatar	Parker Selfridge	
2011	The Other Side	Sean Splinter	
2011	The Rum Diary	Moburg	
2012	Contraband	Tim Briggs	
2012	Columbus Circle	Detective Frank Giardello	Executive producer
2012	Ted	Donny	
2013	Gangster Squad	Officer Conway Keeler	
2014	A Million Ways to Die in the West	Edward	
2014	Selma	Lee C. White	
2015	Results	Paul	
2015	Meadowland	Tim	
2015	Ted 2	Donny	
2015	Papa: Hemingway in Cuba	Ed Myers	
2016	The Bad Batch	Bobby	
2018	A Million Little Pieces	John	
2022	Avatar: The Way of Water	Parker Selfridge	Cameo
2023	Strange Darling	Art Pallone (voice)	Cameo; also cinematographer and producer
2024	Horizon: An American Saga – Chapter 1	H. Silas Pickering	Cameo
2024	Horizon: An American Saga – Chapter 2	H. Silas Pickering	
2025	Avatar: Fire and Ash	Parker Selfridge	
TBA	Horizon: An American Saga – Chapter 3 †	H. Silas Pickering	Filming
TBA	Callback †	TBA	Post-production
TBA	The Decline of Fucking Western Civilization †	TBA	Filming

=== Television ===
Year	Title	Role	Notes
1985	Highway to Heaven	Curtis Johnson	2 episodes
1985	Simon & Simon	Kid #1	Episode: "The Skull of Nostradamus"
1985	The Twilight Zone	Teddy	Episode: "The Beacon"
1985–1989	The New Leave It to Beaver	Duffy Guthrie	15 episodes
1986–1987	Sidekicks	Travis	4 episodes
1987; 1989	Married... with Children	Teddy	2 episodes
1987–1990	My Two Dads	Cory Kupkus	30 episodes
1991	Blossom	Mitchell	Episode: "Blossom Blossoms"
1991–1992	Davis Rules	Skinner Buckley	16 episodes
1992–1993	The Wonder Years	Jeff Billings	Recurring role (season 6); 15 episodes
1993	The Commish	Joey Burke	2 episodes
1993	Family Album	Elvis DeMattis	6 episodes
1993	The Positively True Adventures of the Alleged Texas Cheerleader-Murdering Mom	Pete Reyes	Television film
1994	Walker, Texas Ranger	Tony Kingston	2 episodes
1994	NYPD Blue	Bruce	2 episodes
1994	Ellen	Cashier	Episode: "Pilot"
1995	The X-Files	Darin Peter Oswald	Episode: "D.P.O."
1995	Marker	Eddie	Episode: "Dead Man's Marker"
1995	Chicago Hope	Michael Weber	Episode: "Every Day a Little Death"
1995–1998, 2003	Friends	Frank Buffay Jr./Condom Guy	10 episodes
1996	Tracey Takes On...	Dad	Episode: "Family"
1999	The Hunger	Eddie Foden	Episode: "Sanctuary"
2001	Shot in the Heart	Mikal Gilmore	Television film
2005–2008	My Name Is Earl	Ralph Mariano	6 episodes
2008	Entourage	Nick	2 episodes
2010	Memphis Beat	Gene Templer	Episode: "One Night of Sin"
2013	Family Guy	Randy (voice)	Episode: "Call Girl"
2013–2014	Dads	Warner Whittemore	18 episodes
2014	Robot Chicken DC Comics Special 2: Villains in Paradise	The Joker / Two-Face (voices)	Television film
2015	Robot Chicken DC Comics Special III: Magical Friendship	The Joker / Two-Face (voices)	Television film
2015–2019	Sneaky Pete	Pete Murphy / Marius Josipovic	30 episodes; also producer and directed the episode "Inside Out"
2021	On the Verge	Jerry	11 episodes
2022	The Offer	Joe Colombo	Miniseries
2023	Waco: The Aftermath	Dan Cogdell	Miniseries
2026	American Hostage	Tony Kiritsis	Miniseries
2026	The Greatest	Angelo Dundee	Miniseries

=== Video games ===
Year	Title	Voice role	Notes
2003	Call of Duty	Pvt. Elder	
2006	Marc Ecko's Getting Up: Contents Under Pressure	Kry1	
2009	James Cameron's Avatar: The Game	Parker Selfridge	

=== Music videos ===
Year	Title	Artist(s)	Notes
1998	"Talk About the Blues"	Jon Spencer Blues Explosion	Actor
2006	"Crystal Ball"	Keane	Actor
2016	"Siberian Nights"	The Kills	Director
2020	"Exhale"	Jónsi	Co-director
2020	"Cannibal"	Jónsi, Elizabeth Fraser	Co-director

== Awards and nominations ==
Year	Association	Category	Nominated work	Result
1986	Young Artist Award	Best Younger Guest Actor in a Television Series	Highway to Heaven	Nominated
1989	Young Artist Award	Best Actor in a Television Film	Promised a Miracle	Nominated
1989	Young Artist Award	Best Actor Starring in a Television Series	My Two Dads	Nominated
1990	Young Artist Award	Best Actor in a Comedy Series	My Two Dads	Nominated
1999	Online Film Critics Society	Best Cast	Saving Private Ryan	Won
1999	Screen Actors Guild Award	Best Ensemble Cast	Saving Private Ryan	Nominated
2001	Saturn Award	Best Supporting Actor	The Gift	Nominated
2002	American Film Institute Award	Best Actor in a Television Film	Shot in the Heart	Nominated
2002	Golden Arena Award	Best Actor — Foreign Film	Heaven	Won
2005	Saturn Award	Best Supporting Actor	Sky Captain and the World of Tomorrow	Nominated
2007	Primetime Emmy Awards	Outstanding Guest Actor in a Comedy Series	My Name Is Earl	Nominated
2010	Teen Choice Awards	Choice Hissy Fit	Avatar	Nominated
