= Kevin Kline on screen and stage =

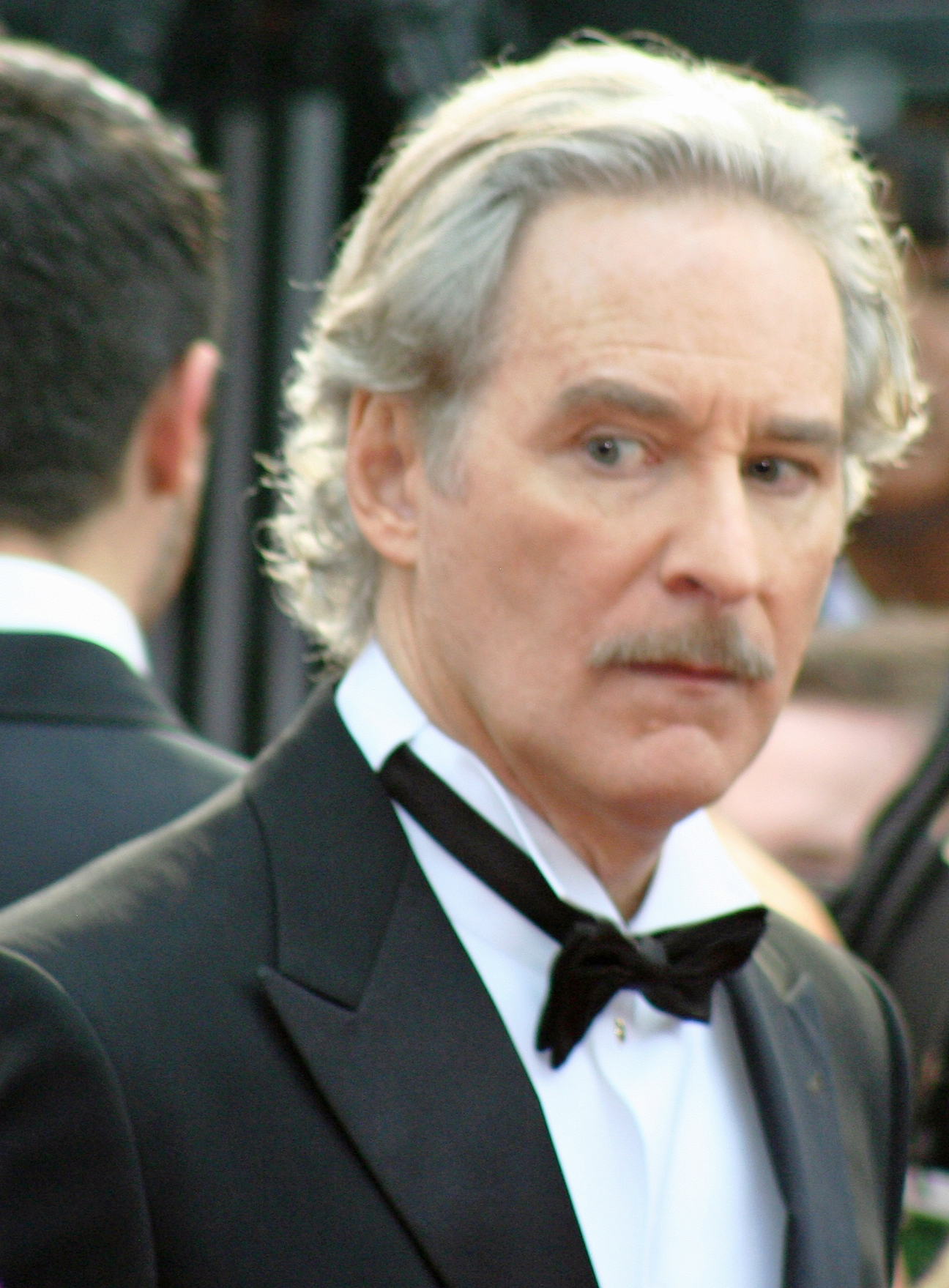
Kevin Kline at the 81st Academy Awards in 2009

Kevin Kline is an American actor on stage and screen.

Kline began his career on stage in 1972 with The Acting Company. He has gone on to win three Tony Awards for his work on Broadway, winning Best Featured Actor in a Musical for the 1978 original production of On the Twentieth Century, and Best Actor in a Musical for the 1981 revival of The Pirates of Penzance. In 2003, he starred as Falstaff in the Broadway production of Henry IV, for which he won the Drama Desk Award for Outstanding Actor in a Play and was nominated for a Tony. In 2017, he won the Tony Award for Best Actor in a Play for the revival of Noël Coward's Present Laughter.

He made his film debut in Sophie's Choice (1982) starring opposite Meryl Streep. For his role in the 1988 comedy hit A Fish Called Wanda, he won the Academy Award for Best Supporting Actor. He is also known for his performances in the films The Pirates of Penzance (1983), Silverado (1985), Cry Freedom (1987), The January Man (1989), Chaplin (1992), Princess Caraboo (1994), A Midsummer Night's Dream (1999), Wild Wild West (1999), The Anniversary Party (2001), The Emperor's Club (2002), The Pink Panther (2006), Last Vegas (2013), My Old Lady (2014), and The Good House (2021). Kline has voiced characters in such films as The Hunchback of Notre Dame (1996), The Road to El Dorado (2000), The Tale of Despereaux (2008), and the animated comedy series Bob's Burgers (2011–present).

== Screen ==
=== Film ===
Year	Title	Role	Notes
1982	Sophie's Choice	Nathan Landau	
1983	The Pirates of Penzance	The Pirate King	
1983	The Big Chill	Harold Cooper	
1985	Silverado	Paden	
1986	Violets Are Blue	Henry Squires	
1987	Cry Freedom	Donald Woods	
1988	A Fish Called Wanda	Otto West	
1989	The January Man	Nick Starkey	
1990	I Love You to Death	Joey Boca	
1991	Soapdish	Jeffery Anderson / Dr. Rod Randall	
1991	Grand Canyon	Mack	
1992	Consenting Adults	Richard Parker	
1992	Chaplin	Douglas Fairbanks	
1993	Dave	Dave Kovic / President William Harrison Mitchell	
1993	The Nutcracker	Narrator	Voice
1994	Princess Caraboo	Frixos	
1995	French Kiss	Luc Teyssier	
1996	The Hunchback of Notre Dame	Captain Phoebus	Voice
1996	Looking for Richard	Himself	Documentary
1997	The Ice Storm	Ben Hood	
1997	Fierce Creatures	Vince McCain / Rod McCain	
1997	In & Out	Howard Brackett	
1999	A Midsummer Night's Dream	Nick Bottom	
1999	Wild Wild West	U.S. Marshal Artemus "Artie" Gordon / President Ulysses S. Grant	
2000	The Road to El Dorado	Tulio	Voice
2001	The Anniversary Party	Cal Gold	
2001	Life as a House	George Monroe	
2002	Orange County	Marcus Skinner	Uncredited cameo
2002	The Hunchback of Notre Dame II	Captain Phoebus	Voice; direct-to-video
2002	The Emperor's Club	William Hundert	
2004	De-Lovely	Cole Porter	
2004	Jiminy Glick in Lalawood	Himself	Cameo
2006	The Pink Panther	Chief Inspector Dreyfus	
2006	A Prairie Home Companion	Guy Noir	
2006	As You Like It	Jaques	
2007	Trade	Ray Sheridan	
2008	Definitely, Maybe	Hampton Roth	
2008	The Tale of Despereaux	Andre	Voice
2009	Queen to Play	Docteur Kröger	
2010	The Extra Man	Henry Harrison	
2011	No Strings Attached	Alvin Franklin	
2011	The Conspirator	Edwin Stanton	
2012	Darling Companion	Dr. Joseph Winter	
2013	Last Vegas	Sam Harris	
2013	The Last of Robin Hood	Errol Flynn	
2014	My Old Lady	Mathias Gold	
2015	Ricki and the Flash	Pete Brummel	
2016	Dean	Robert Anderson	
2017	Beauty and the Beast	Maurice	
2021	Here Today	Himself	
2021	The Starling	Dr. Larry Fine	
2021	The Good House	Frank Getchell	
2022	The Bob's Burgers Movie	Calvin Fischoeder	Voice
2025	A Big Bold Beautiful Journey	The Mechanic	

=== Television ===
Year	Title	Role	Notes
1976	Search for Tomorrow	Woody Reed	156 episodes
1976	The Time of Your Life	McCarthy	TV movie
1977	The CBS Festival of Lively Arts for Young People	Petruchio	Episode: "Henry Winkler Meets William Shakespeare"
1987	The Grand Knockout Tournament	Himself	TV special
1988–1993	Saturday Night Live	Himself (host)	2 episodes
1990	Hamlet	Hamlet	Television film
1991	Merlin and the Dragons	Narrator	Television film
2003	Freedom: A History of Us	Various	Voice, 7 episodes
2008	Cyrano de Bergerac	Cyrano de Bergerac	Television special
2011–present	Bob's Burgers	Calvin Fischoeder	Voice, 47 episodes
2016	Maya & Marty	Husband	Episode: "Will Forte, Amy Poehler and Jerry Seinfeld"
2024	Disclaimer	Stephen Brigstocke	Main role; miniseries
2026	American Classic	Richard Bean	Also executive producer

=== Video games ===
- Disney's Animated Storybook: The Hunchback of Notre Dame (1996) - Captain Phoebus (voice)

== Stage ==
Year	Title	Role	Theater/Notes
1970	The Chronicles of King Henry VI, Part 2	Huntsman/Soldier	Delacorte Theater (in repertory)
1970	Richard III	Tressel	Delacorte Theater (in repertory)
1972	The School for Scandal	Charles Surface	Good Shepherd-Faith Church (in repertory)
1972	Women Beware Women	Guardiano	Good Shepherd-Faith Church (in repertory)
1972	The Hostage	IRA Officer	Good Shepherd-Faith Church (in repertory)
1972	The Lower Depths	Vaska Pepel	Good Shepherd-Faith Church (in repertory)
1973	The Three Sisters	Vershinin	Billy Rose Theatre (in repertory)
1973	The Beggar's Opera	Macheath	Billy Rose Theatre (in repertory)
1973	Measure for Measure	Friar Pete	Billy Rose Theatre (in repertory)
1973	Scapin	Leandre	Billy Rose Theatre (in repertory)
1975	The Robber Bridgegroom	Jamie Lockhart	Harkness Theatre (in repertory)
1975	Edward II	Lightborn / Lancaster	Harkness Theatre (in repertory)
1975	The Time of Your Life	McCarthy / Wesley	Harkness Theatre (in repertory)
1975	The Three Sisters	Vershinin	Harkness Theatre (in repertory)
1976	Beware the Jubjub Bird	Daniel	Theater Four
1978	On the Twentieth Century	Bruce Granit	St. James Theatre
1979	Loose Ends	Paul	Circle in the Square Theatre
1980	The Pirates of Penzance	The Pirate King	Delacorte Theater
1981	The Pirates of Penzance	The Pirate King	Uris Theater, Minskoff Theatre
1983	King Richard III	Richard	Delacorte Theater
1984	Henry V	King Henry V	Delacorte Theater
1985	Arms and the Man	Capt. Bluntschli	Circle in the Square Theatre
1986	Hamlet	Hamlet	The Public Theater
1988	Much Ado About Nothing	Benedick	Delacorte Theater
1990	Hamlet	Hamlet	The Public Theater
1993	Measure for Measure	Duke	Delacorte Theater
1997	Ivanov	Nikolai Ivanov	Vivian Beaumont Theater
2001	The Seagull	Trigorin	Delacorte Theater
2002	Short Talks on the Universe	Jim in the 3 A.M.	Eugene O'Neill Theatre
2003	The Play What I Wrote	Mystery Guest Star	Lyceum Theatre
2003	Henry IV	Sir John Falstaff	Vivian Beaumont Theater
2006	Mother Courage and Her Children	Cook	Delacorte Theater
2007	King Lear	King Lear	The Public Theater
2007	Cyrano de Bergerac	Cyrano de Bergerac	Richard Rodgers Theatre
2013	The Pirates of Penzance	The Pirate King	Delacorte Theater
2017	Present Laughter	Garry Essendine	St. James Theatre
