= List of awards and nominations received by Kevin Kline =

Kevin Kline awards and nominations
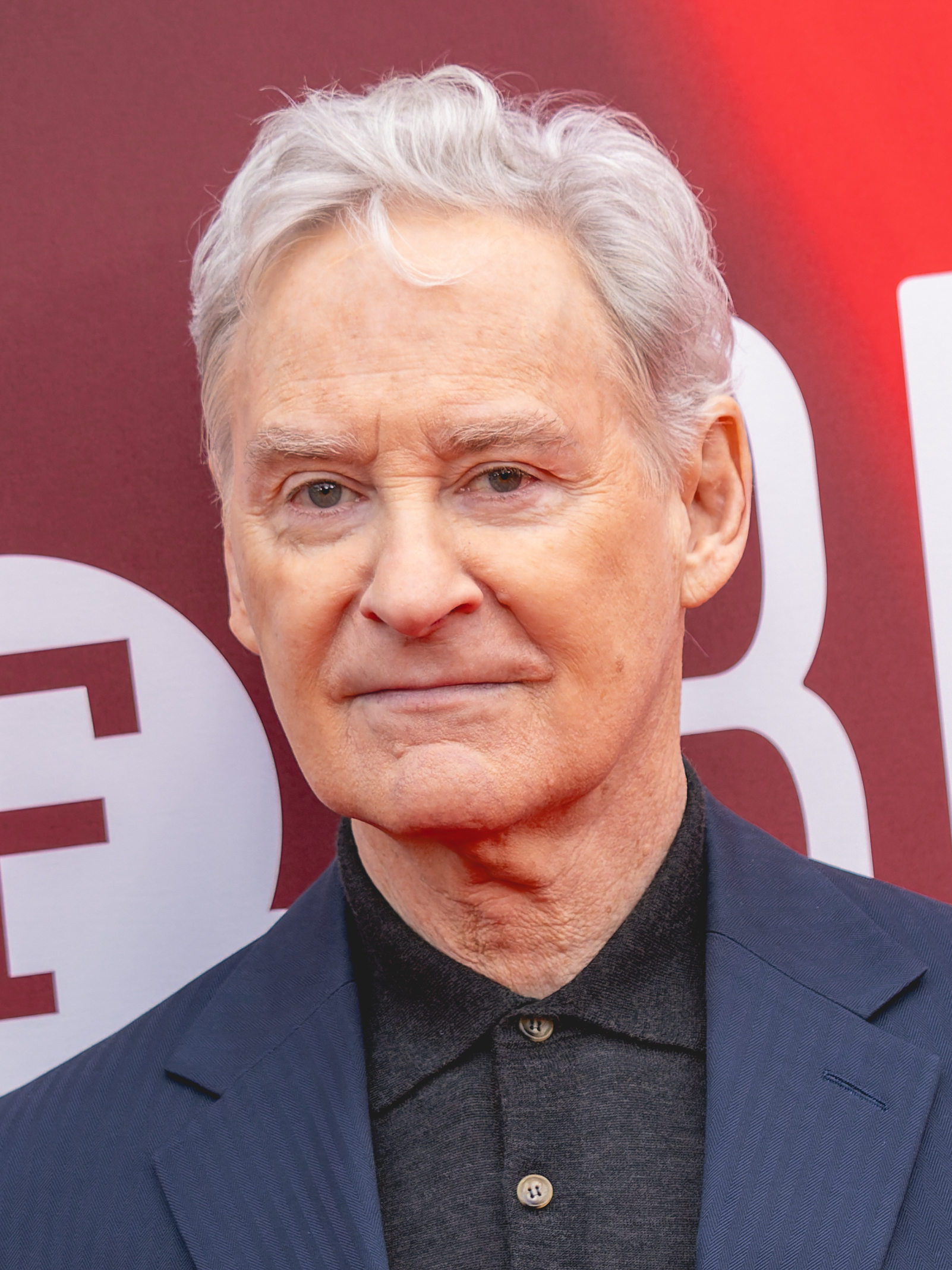
- Kline in 2024
Awards and nominations
| Award | Wins | Nominations |
| Academy Awards | 1 | 1 |
| Actor Awards | 1 | 4 |
| BAFTA Awards | 0 | 2 |
| Emmy Awards | 0 | 2 |
| Golden Globes | 0 | 6 |
| Tony Awards | 3 | 4 |

Totals (Note: Certain award groups do not simply award one winner. They acknowledge several different recipients, have runners-up, and have third place. Since this is a specific recognition and is different from losing an award, runner-up mentions are considered wins in this award tally. For simplification and to avoid errors, each award in this list has been presumed to have had a prior nomination.)
- Wins: 18
- Nominations: 58

Kevin Kline is an American actor known for his performances in film, television and the stage. He is the recipient of several accolades, including an Academy Award, an Actor Award, and three Tony Awards, as well as nominations for two British Academy Film Awards (BAFTA), six Golden Globes, and two Primetime Emmy Awards.

Beginning his career on stage in 1972 with The Acting Company, Kline went on to win three Tony Awards: Best Featured Actor in a Musical for playing the romantic lead in the original production of On the Twentieth Century (1978), Best Actor in a Musical for playing The Pirate King in the revival of The Pirates of Penzance (1981), and Best Actor in a Play for playing a self-obsessed actor in the revival of the Noël Coward's play Present Laughter (2017). He was also Tony-nominated for his portrayal of Sir John Falstaff in the Shakespearean play Henry IV (2004). For his work on the stage, he has also been honored with four Drama Desk Awards, a Lucille Lortel Award, an Obie Award, and two Outer Critics Circle Awards.

Kline made his film debut in the psychological drama Sophie's Choice (1982), a role that earned him nominations for the BAFTA Award for Most Promising Newcomer and the Golden Globe Award for New Star of the Year. He was nominated for the Golden Globe Award for Best Actor for his performances as a soap opera star in the comedy Soapdish (1991), a dual role as president and impersonator in the political comedy Dave (1993), a teacher outed by his student in the comedy In & Out (1997), and Cole Porter in the musical biopic De-Lovely (2004). He won the Academy Award for Best Supporting Actor for playing a volatile con artist in the heist comedy film A Fish Called Wanda (1988), for which he was also nominated for the BAFTA Award for Best Actor in a Leading Role.

For his work on television, Kline won the Actor Award for Outstanding Actor in a Miniseries or Television Movie for the HBO romance film As You Like It (2006). He received a nomination for the Primetime Emmy Award for Outstanding Lead Actor in a Limited Series or Movie for playing the title role in the PBS made-for-television adaptation of Cyrano de Bergerac (2008), and the Primetime Emmy Award for Outstanding Character Voice-Over Performance for playing the wealthy landlord Mr. Fischoeder in the Fox animated sitcom Bob's Burgers (2011–present).

== Major associations ==
=== Academy Awards ===
| Year | Category | Nominated work | Result | Ref. |
|---|---|---|---|---|
| 1989 | Best Supporting Actor | A Fish Called Wanda | Won | |

=== Actor Awards ===
| Year | Category | Nominated work | Result | Ref. |
|---|---|---|---|---|
| 2002 | Outstanding Actor in a Leading Role | Life as a House | Nominated | |
| 2008 | Outstanding Actor in a Miniseries or Television Movie | As You Like It | Won | |
| 2010 | Outstanding Actor in a Miniseries or Television Movie | Cyrano de Bergerac | Nominated | |
| 2025 | Outstanding Actor in a Miniseries or Television Movie | Disclaimer | Nominated | |

=== BAFTA Awards ===
| Year | Category | Nominated work | Result | Ref. |
British Academy Film Awards
| 1984 | Most Promising Newcomer | Sophie's Choice | Nominated | |
| 1989 | Best Actor in a Leading Role | A Fish Called Wanda | Nominated | |

=== Emmy Awards ===
Primetime Emmy Awards
| Year | Category | Nominated work | Result | Ref. |
|---|---|---|---|---|
| 2009 | Outstanding Lead Actor in a Limited Series or Movie | Cyrano de Bergerac | Nominated | |
| 2017 | Outstanding Character Voice-Over Performance | Bob's Burgers ("The Last Gingerbread House on the Left") | Nominated | |

=== Golden Globes ===
| Year | Category | Nominated work | Result | Ref. |
|---|---|---|---|---|
| 1983 | New Star of the Year – Actor | Sophie's Choice | Nominated | |
| 1992 | Best Actor in a Motion Picture – Musical or Comedy | Soapdish | Nominated | |
| 1994 | Best Actor in a Motion Picture – Musical or Comedy | Dave | Nominated | |
| 1998 | Best Actor in a Motion Picture – Musical or Comedy | In & Out | Nominated | |
| 2005 | Best Actor in a Motion Picture – Musical or Comedy | De-Lovely | Nominated | |
| 2025 | Best Actor in a Limited Series or Television Film | Disclaimer | Nominated | |

=== Tony Awards ===
| Year | Category | Nominated work | Result | Ref. |
|---|---|---|---|---|
| 1978 | Best Featured Actor in a Musical | On the Twentieth Century | Won | |
| 1981 | Best Actor in a Musical | The Pirates of Penzance | Won | |
| 2004 | Best Actor in a Play | Henry IV | Nominated | |
| 2017 | Best Actor in a Play | Present Laughter | Won | |

== Other theatre awards ==
Awards and nominations received by Kevin Kline
| Award | Year | Category | Nominated work | Result | Ref. |
|---|---|---|---|---|---|
| Drama Desk Awards | 1978 | Outstanding Featured Actor in a Musical | On the Twentieth Century | Won | |
| Drama Desk Awards | 1981 | Outstanding Actor in a Musical | The Pirates of Penzance | Won | |
| Drama Desk Awards | 1986 | Outstanding Actor in a Play | Hamlet | Nominated | |
| Drama Desk Awards | 1991 | Outstanding Director of a Play | Hamlet | Nominated | |
| Drama Desk Awards | 1991 | Outstanding Actor in a Play | Hamlet | Nominated | |
| Drama Desk Awards | 2004 | Outstanding Actor in a Play | Henry IV | Won | |
| Drama Desk Awards | 2008 | Outstanding Actor in a Play | Cyrano de Bergerac | Nominated | |
| Drama Desk Awards | 2017 | Outstanding Actor in a Play | Present Laughter | Won | |
| Drama League Awards | 2017 | Distinguished Performance | Present Laughter | Nominated | |
| Lucille Lortel Awards | 2007 | Lifetime Achievement Award | — | Won | |
| Obie Awards | 1986 | Sustained Excellence of Performance | — | Won | |
| Outer Critics Circle Awards | 2004 | Outstanding Actor in a Play | Henry IV | Nominated | |
| Outer Critics Circle Awards | 2008 | Outstanding Actor in a Play | Cyrano de Bergerac | Won | |
| Outer Critics Circle Awards | 2017 | Outstanding Actor in a Play | Present Laughter | Won | |

== Miscellaneous awards ==
Awards and nominations received by Kevin Kline
| Award | Year | Category | Nominated work | Result | Ref. |
|---|---|---|---|---|---|
| American Comedy Awards | 1989 | Funniest Actor in a Motion Picture (Leading Role) | A Fish Called Wanda | Nominated | |
| American Comedy Awards | 1992 | Funniest Actor in a Motion Picture (Leading Role) | Soapdish | Nominated | |
| American Comedy Awards | 1994 | Funniest Actor in a Motion Picture (Leading Role) | Dave | Nominated | |
| American Comedy Awards | 1996 | Funniest Actor in a Motion Picture (Leading Role) | French Kiss | Nominated | |
| Blockbuster Entertainment Awards | 1998 | Favorite Actor – Comedy | In & Out | Nominated | |
| Blockbuster Entertainment Awards | 2000 | Favorite Action Team (with Will Smith) | Wild Wild West | Nominated | |
| Critics' Choice Awards | 2007 | Best Acting Ensemble (with the cast) | A Prairie Home Companion | Nominated | |
| Critics' Choice Awards | 2025 | Best Actor in a Limited Series or Movie Made for Television | Disclaimer | Nominated | |
| DVD Exclusive Awards | 2003 | Best Animated Character Performance | The Hunchback of Notre Dame II | Nominated | |
| Golden Raspberry Awards | 2000 | Worst Actor | Wild Wild West | Nominated | |
| Golden Raspberry Awards | 2000 | Worst Supporting Actress (as a prostitute) | Wild Wild West | Nominated | |
| Golden Raspberry Awards | 2000 | Worst Screen Couple (with Will Smith) | Wild Wild West | Won | |
| Gotham Awards | 1997 | Actor Award | — | Won | |
| Gotham Awards | 2006 | Best Ensemble Cast (with the cast) | A Prairie Home Companion | Nominated | |
| Hasty Pudding Theatricals Awards | 1998 | Man of the Year | — | Won | |
| London Film Critics' Circle Awards | 1999 | Actor of the Year | The Ice Storm / In & Out | Nominated | |
| MTV Movie & TV Awards | 1998 | Best Kiss (with Tom Selleck) | In & Out | Nominated | |
| Munich Film Festival Awards | 2007 | CineMerit Award | — | Won | |
| Nickelodeon Kids' Choice Awards | 2001 | Favorite Voice from an Animated Movie | The Road to El Dorado | Nominated | |
| Satellite Awards | 1998 | Best Actor in a Motion Picture – Comedy or Musical | In & Out | Nominated | |
| Satellite Awards | 2005 | Best Actor in a Motion Picture – Comedy or Musical | De-Lovely | Nominated | |
| St. Louis International Film Festival Awards | 2002 | Lifetime Achievement Award | — | Won | |
| Stinkers Bad Movie Awards | 2000 | Worst Actor | Wild Wild West | Nominated | |
| Stinkers Bad Movie Awards | 2000 | Worst On-Screen Couple (with Will Smith) | Wild Wild West | Nominated | |
| Stinkers Bad Movie Awards | 2007 | Most Annoying Fake Accent (Male) | The Pink Panther | Nominated | |
