= 42nd British Academy Film Awards =

1989 film awards ceremony

- Date: 19 March 1989
- Site: Grosvenor House Hotel
- Hosted by: Anna Ford; David Dimbleby

Highlights
- Best Film: The Last Emperor
- Best Actor: John Cleese; A Fish Called Wanda
- Best Actress: Maggie Smith; The Lonely Passion of Judith Hearne
- Most awards: Empire of the Sun and The Last Emperor (3)
- Most nominations: The Last Emperor (11)

The 42nd British Academy Film Awards, commonly known as the BAFTAs, took place on 19 March 1989 at the Grosvenor House Hotel in London.The awards were presented honouring the best national and foreign films of 1988. Presented by the British Academy of Film and Television Arts, accolades were handed out for the best feature-length film and documentaries of any nationality that were screened at British cinemas in 1988.

Jeremy Thomas' and Bernardo Bertolucci's The Last Emperor won the award for Best Film.

The ceremony was hosted by Anna Ford and David Dimbleby.

== Winners and nominees ==
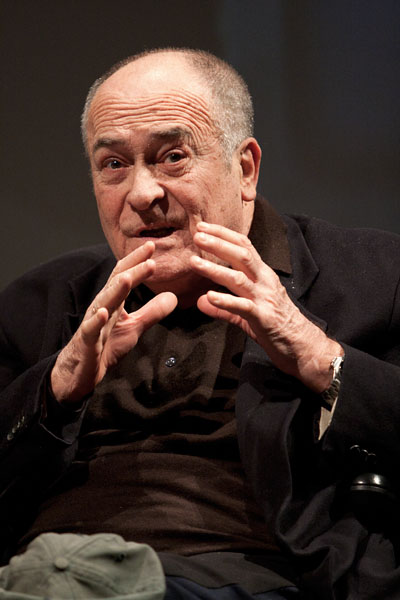
Bernardo Bertolucci, Best Film co-winner

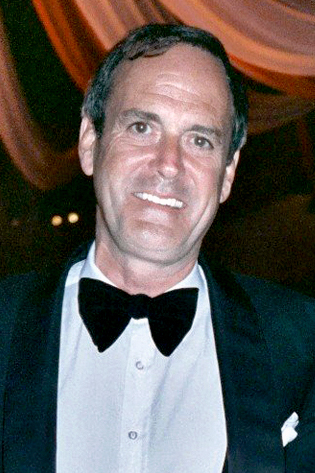
John Cleese, Best Actor winner

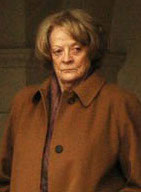
Maggie Smith, Best Actress winner

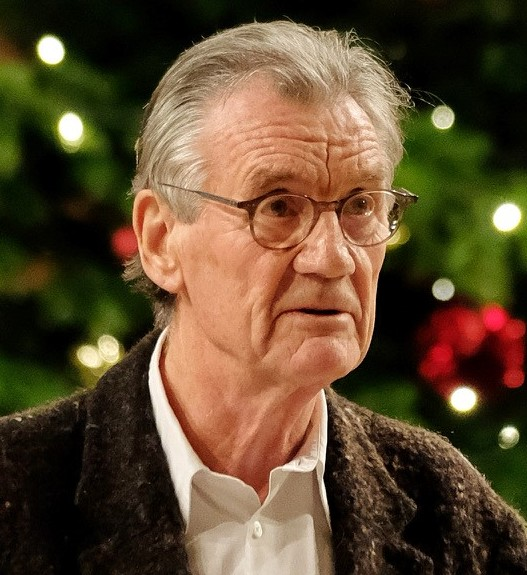
Michael Palin, Best Supporting Actor winner

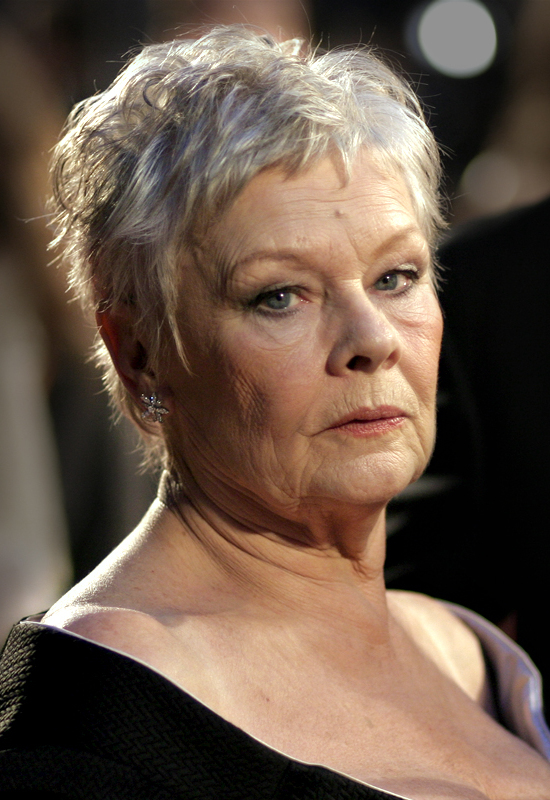
Judi Dench, Best Supporting Actress winner

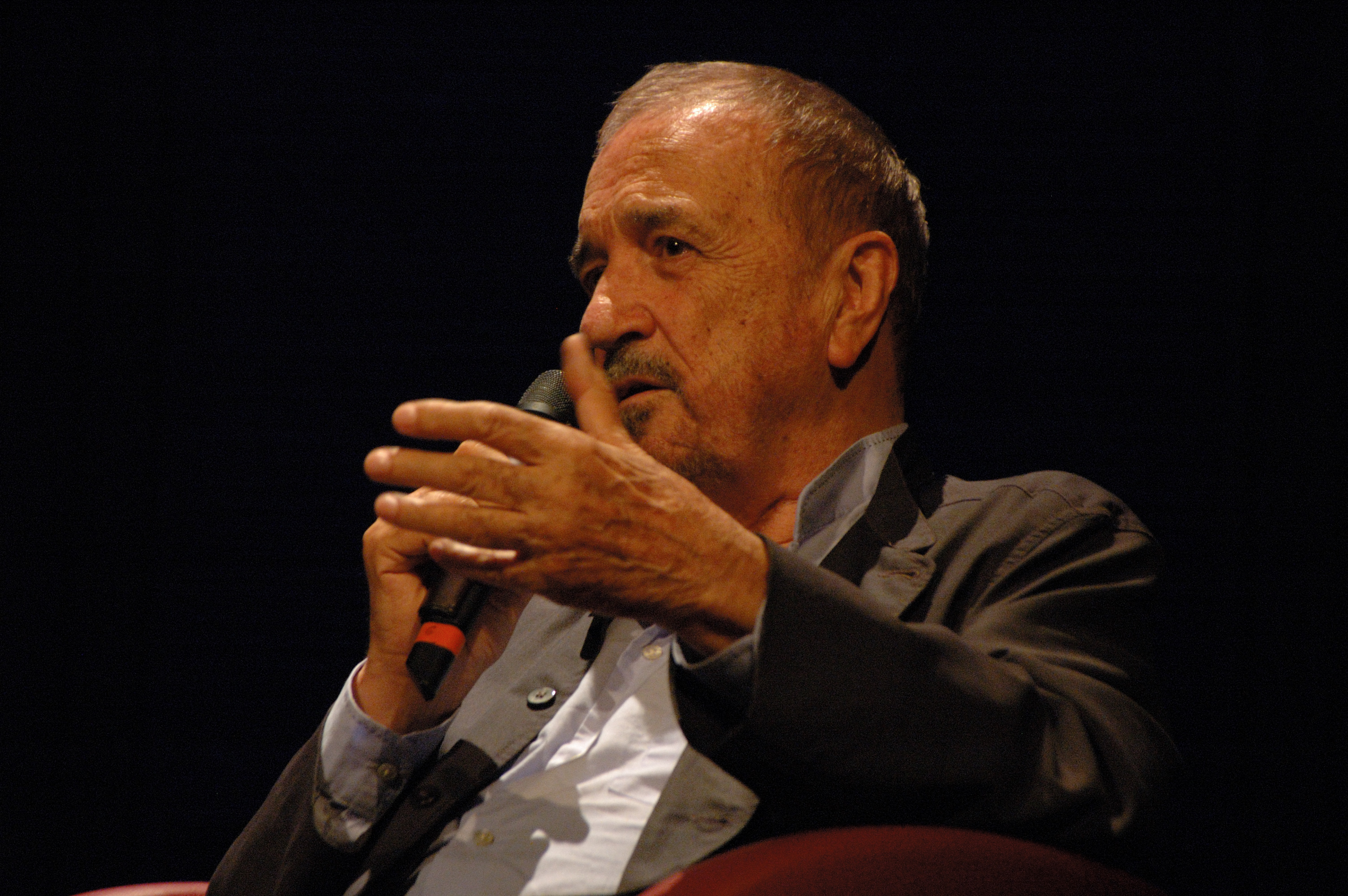
Jean-Claude Carrière, Best Adapted Screenplay co-winner

=== BAFTA Fellowship ===
- **Alec Guinness**

=== Outstanding British Contribution to Cinema ===
- **Charles Crichton**

=== BAFTA Special Award ===
- **Julie Andrews** and **Leslie Hardcastle**

=== BAFTA Special Award for Craft ===
- **Richard Williams**

=== Awards ===
Winners are listed first and highlighted in boldface.

**Best Film**: **The Last Emperor – Jeremy Thomas and Bernardo Bertolucci**; Au revoir les enfants – Louis Malle; Babette's Feast – Just Betzer, Bo Christensen and Gabriel Axel; A Fish Called Wanda – Michael Shamberg and Charles Crichton	**Best Direction**: **Louis Malle – Au revoir les enfants**; Bernardo Bertolucci – The Last Emperor; Charles Crichton – A Fish Called Wanda; Gabriel Axel – Babette's Feast
**Best Actor in a Leading Role**: **John Cleese – A Fish Called Wanda as Archie Leach**; Kevin Kline – A Fish Called Wanda as Otto West; Michael Douglas – Fatal Attraction as Dan Gallagher; Robin Williams – Good Morning, Vietnam as Adrian Cronauer	**Best Actress in a Leading Role**: **Maggie Smith – The Lonely Passion of Judith Hearne as Judith Hearne**; Cher – Moonstruck as Loretta Castorini; Jamie Lee Curtis – A Fish Called Wanda as Wanda Gershwitz; Stéphane Audran – Babette's Feast as Babette Hersant
**Best Actor in a Supporting Role**: **Michael Palin – A Fish Called Wanda as Ken Pile**; David Suchet – A World Apart as Muller; Joss Ackland – White Mischief as Jock Delves Broughton; Peter O'Toole – The Last Emperor as Reginald Johnston	**Best Actress in a Supporting Role**: **Judi Dench – A Handful of Dust as Mrs. Beaver**; Anne Archer – Fatal Attraction as Beth Rogerson Gallagher; Maria Aitken – A Fish Called Wanda as Wendy Leach; Olympia Dukakis – Moonstruck as Rose Castorini
**Best Original Screenplay**: **A World Apart – Shawn Slovo**; Au revoir les enfants – Louis Malle; A Fish Called Wanda – John Cleese; Moonstruck – John Patrick Shanley	**Best Adapted Screenplay**: **The Unbearable Lightness of Being – Jean-Claude Carrière and Philip Kaufman**; Babette's Feast – Gabriel Axel; Empire of the Sun – Tom Stoppard; Who Framed Roger Rabbit – Jeffrey Price and Peter S. Seaman
**Best Cinematography**: **Empire of the Sun – Allen Daviau**; Babette's Feast – Henning Kristiansen; The Last Emperor – Vittorio Storaro; Who Framed Roger Rabbit – Dean Cundey	**Best Costume Design**: **The Last Emperor – James Acheson**; The Dressmaker – Judy Moorcroft; Empire of the Sun – Bob Ringwood; White Mischief – Marit Allen
**Best Editing**: **Fatal Attraction – Michael Kahn and Peter E. Berger**; A Fish Called Wanda – John Jympson; The Last Emperor – Gabriella Cristiani; Who Framed Roger Rabbit – Arthur Schmidt	**Best Makeup and Hair**: **The Last Emperor – Fabrizio Sforza**; Beetlejuice – Steve La Porte, Ve Neill and Robert Short; A Handful of Dust – Sally Sutton; RoboCop – Carla Palmer
**Best Original Music**: **Empire of the Sun – John Williams**; Bird – Lennie Niehaus; The Last Emperor – Ryuichi Sakamoto, David Byrne and Cong Su; Moonstruck – Dick Hyman	**Best Production Design**: **Tucker: The Man and His Dream – Dean Tavoularis**; Empire of the Sun – Norman Reynolds; The Last Emperor – Ferdinando Scarfiotti; Who Framed Roger Rabbit – Elliot Scott
**Best Sound**: **Empire of the Sun – Charles L. Campbell, Colin Charles, Louis Edemann, Robert Knudson and Tony Dawe**; Bird – Alan Robert Murray, Robert G. Henderson, Willie D. Burton and Les Fresholtz; Good Morning, Vietnam – Bill Phillips, Clive Winter and Terry Porter; The Last Emperor – Ivan Sharrock, Bill Rowe and Les Wiggins	**Best Special Visual Effects**: **Who Framed Roger Rabbit – George Gibbs, Richard Williams, Ken Ralston and Edward Jones**; Beetlejuice – Peter Kuran, Alan Munro, Robert Short and Ted Rea; The Last Emperor – Giannetto De Rossi and Fabrizio Martinelli; RoboCop – Rob Bottin, Phil Tippett, Peter Kuran and Rocco Gioffre
**Best Documentary**: **This Week: Death on the Rock – Chris Oxley**; The Duty Men: East Enders – Paul Hamann; In from the Cold: A Portrait of Richard Burton – Tony Palmer; Viewpoint Special: The Men Who Killed Kennedy – Nigel Turner	**Best Film Not in the English Language**: **Babette's Feast – Just Betzer, Bo Christensen and Gabriel Axel**; Au revoir les enfants – Louis Malle; Dark Eyes – Silvia D'Amico Bendico, Carlo Cucchi and Nikita Mikhalkov; Wings of Desire – Wim Wenders and Anatole Dauman
**Best Short Animation**: **The Hill Farm – Mark Baker**; Clothes Animation – Osbert Parker; Daddie's Little Piece of Dresden China – Karen Watson; Rarg – Tony Collingwood	**Best Short Film**: **Defence Counsel Sedov – Evgeny Tsymbal**; Cane Toads: An Unnatural History – Mark Lewis; The Unkindest Cut – Jim Shields; Water's Edge – Suri Krishnamma

== Statistics ==
Films that received multiple nominations
Nominations	Film
11	The Last Emperor
9	A Fish Called Wanda
6	Babette's Feast
6	Empire of the Sun
5	Who Framed Roger Rabbit
4	Au revoir les enfants
4	Moonstruck
3	Fatal Attraction
2	Beetlejuice
2	Bird
2	Good Morning, Vietnam
2	A Handful of Dust
2	RoboCop
2	White Mischief
2	A World Apart

Films that received multiple awards
Awards	Film
3	Empire of the Sun
3	The Last Emperor
2	A Fish Called Wanda

== See also ==
- 61st Academy Awards
- 14th César Awards
- 41st Directors Guild of America Awards
- 2nd European Film Awards
- 46th Golden Globe Awards
- 9th Golden Raspberry Awards
- 3rd Goya Awards
- 4th Independent Spirit Awards
- 15th Saturn Awards
- 41st Writers Guild of America Awards
