= William Mulvihill =

American author

William Patrick Mulvihill
- Born: June 25, 1923; Sag Harbor, New York, USA
- Died: September 17, 2004 (aged 81); Glen Cove, Long Island, New York, USA
- Occupations: Author, screenwriter, teacher, environmentalist, historian
- Writing career
- Genre: Adventure

William Patrick Mulvihill (June 25, 1923 – September 17, 2004) was an American author of several novels. Most notably, he wrote the New York Times bestseller, The Sands of Kalahari, which was later adapted into the movie by Paramount in 1965.

== Early life ==
Mulvihill was born on June 25, 1923, in Sag Harbor, New York, the youngest child and son of Lieutenant Commander Daniel F. Mulvihill and Anna McDonough. As a child, Mulvihill was intensely interested in the outdoors.

== Military career ==
While a student at Cornell University, Mulvihill was a member of the Army Enlisted Reserve. He completed boot camp at Fort Dix, New Jersey, and infantry training at Ft. Benning, Georgia. In 1942, he was sent to the University of New Hampshire for the Army Specialized Training Program (ASTP). Upon completion, he would have been commissioned as a second lieutenant in the Office of Strategic Services (OSS). However, Mulvihill was sent to Fort Bragg, North Carolina, to receive field artillery training before he could finish ASTP.

Mulvihill was then sent to the south of England for approximately a month, arriving in Europe after the D-Day invasion. Due to his command of the German language and additional Army language training, he served as a forward observer with both the 78th Division and the 2nd Ranger Battalion during campaigns in the Ardennes, Rhineland and Central Europe, and experienced combat at the Battle of the Bulge, attaining the rank of Corporal and Squad Leader. Upon his return to the United States, he completed his studies at Cornell, earning a bachelor's degree in German literature.

== Education ==
Mulvihill attended the one-room schoolhouse of St. Andrew's Catholic School and Pierson High School. He graduated from Cornell University with a bachelor's degree in German literature, and a master's degree in Teaching (history) from Columbia University. Afterwards, he continued with post-masters studies at C W Post University, where he later taught creative writing.

== Personal life ==
Mulvihill married Mary Marceau an on June 18, 1946, in Winchester, Massachusetts and remained married for over 58 years. They had two daughters; Nancy Mulvihill and MaryAnn Mulvihill-Decker.

Mulvihill had a passion for Africa and had visited the continent three times during the 1960s and 1970s. In adulthood, he had amassed a large collection of books concerning Africa which several African scholars from local colleges and universities told him was “...the largest private library on Africa in New York." "It was this incredible wall of books – he really was a scholar and expert on African history and natural history". He was also president of the Glen Cove Library and served on the city's tree commission.

== Teaching career ==
Mulvihill became chairman of the history department at Glen Cove High School where he taught history for 32 years, with an emphasis on African history. As an adjunct professor, Mulvihill also taught creative writing at Nassau Community and CW Post colleges. He served as both a member and once president of the Board of Directors of the Glen Cove Library. He was a contributing editor to the Long Island Forum and a regular contributor to The Sag Harbor Express.

== Businesses ==
Mulvihill owned Brickiln Press, a book publisher which deals in rare books with an emphasis on Africana, and which published his book South Fork Place Names: Some Informational Long Island History.

== Mulvihill Preserve ==
The Anna and Daniel Mulvihill Preserve, purchased by the Town of Southampton on March 26, 2003, was dedicated on June 15, 2001. The preserve covered 75 acres and was established by William and his sister Dolores in memory of their parents. This land is contiguous to the Anna and Daniel Mulvihill Preserve and was named the William Mulvihill Preserve in 2006, bringing the total land preserved at that time to just over 100 acres.

Mulvihill, an admitted curmudgeon and "anti-growth fanatic" as well as known for being an ardent environmentalist, wanted to see land remain as undeveloped as possible. "I don't like to see farm land or forest land destroyed," Mulvihill said. "I'm in anguish every time I see a new house being built". Mulvihill hoped that the Anna and Daniel Mulvihill Preserve would help save the local environment before it became destroyed like the area around his home. "People come out to the East End for its bucolic aspects and pristine water," Mulvihill said. "If we continue to overdevelop it's going to wind up like Nassau County and there's no point being active down there because it's all gone".

== Writing career ==
Mulvihill was the author of a dozen novels, several of which have been adapted or optioned to be adapted into feature movies. He is perhaps most well known for his novel, The Sands of Kalahari, and hundreds of essays and many "letters to the editor" of popular publications. He also contributed to the Our Town column of the newspaper Sag Harbor Express. His novel The Mantrackers was later reworked and self-published as Serengeti in 1995 and optioned for a movie in 2012.

His wife regularly typed his notes and encouraged him to continue writing. He continued to write nearly every day even at age 81. His daughter has said about his writing habits, "he wrote longhand, he didn’t write on the computer. He’d edit and edit and do different versions. He’d let the story happen and wouldn’t know exactly where it was going. He’d just start writing".

== Film career ==
Mulvihill's novel The Sands of Kalahari was adapted into a screenplay for the movie Sands of the Kalahari by Cy Endfield for Paramount in 1965. His novel The Mantrackers was optioned with plans to film the movie on location in South Africa.

== Awards ==
His novel published in 1960, The Sands of Kalahari, was a New York Times Bestseller and the first novel to win the Putnam Literary Award.

== Death ==
On September 17, 2004, William Mulvihill died from pancreatic cancer in Glen Cove, Long Island, New York, at age 81.

== Bibliography ==
=== Novels ===
- Fire Mission (1957)
- The Sands of Kalahari (1960)
- The Mantrackers (1960)
- Night of the Axe (1972)
- I've Got Viktor Schalkenburg (1975)
- The Tiger Heart (1997)
- Three Novels and a Story (1995)
- Serengeti(1995)
- God is Blind (1996)
- Sagaponack (1999)
- Meadow Lane (1998)
- Sagaponack (2010)

=== Nonfiction ===
- South Fork Place Names: Some Informational Long Island History (2007)
