= Sands of the Kalahari =

1965 British adventure film directed by Cy Endfield

- Theatrical poster by Frank McCarthy
- Directed by: Cy Endfield
- Screenplay by: Cy Endfield
- Based on: The Sands of Kalahari; 1960 novel by William Mulvihill
- Produced by: Cy Endfield; Stanley Baker
- Starring: Stuart Whitman; Stanley Baker; Susannah York
- Cinematography: Erwin Hillier
- Edited by: John Jympson
- Music by: John Dankworth
- Distributed by: Paramount British Pictures
- Release date: 2 December 1965
- Running time: 119 minutes
- Country: United Kingdom
- Language: English

Sands of the Kalahari is a 1965 British adventure film starring Stuart Whitman, Stanley Baker, Susannah York, Harry Andrews, Theodore Bikel and Nigel Davenport, based on the 1960 novel The Sands of Kalahari by William Mulvihill. The screenplay was written by Cy Endfield and the uncredited William Mulvihill and directed by Cy Endfield. It was filmed in South West Africa (now Namibia) and Spain and released by Paramount Pictures.

== Plot ==
A disparate and desperate group of plane crash survivors are thrust into a desolate mountainous desert region somewhere within present-day Namibia. Brian O'Brien is a big game hunter and the best survivalist of the group. Shortly after the plane crashes, stranding its passengers, he risks his life by re-entering the burning wreck and recovering vital supplies, including a hunting rifle; however, O'Brien's motives are far from noble. Thinking his own chances will be improved by the absence of competition, he ruthlessly seeks to eliminate his fellow survivors, one by one, intending to leave only Grace Monckton (Susannah York) alive, an "Eve" for his "Adam."

In addition to O'Brien's treachery, the survivors are menaced by a troop of chacma baboons inhabiting the area. Initially content to holler at the intruders from the distance, the animals gradually become more aggressive as they realize the people are only a physical threat to them when they have weapons.

Before O'Brien is able to bring his plan to fruition, one of the fellow survivors he had driven off into the desert at gun point (presumably to die of thirst) returns with a rescue party. The remaining survivors make their escape in a helicopter. O'Brien, aware he will be prosecuted for murder if he returns to civilization, chooses to remain behind.

With O'Brien the sole human in their domain, the baboons become more belligerent. At first he is able to keep them at bay with his rifle. When he runs out of ammunition, O'Brien brazenly challenges the alpha male to a fight and succeeds in killing him with his bare hands. In the film's final shot the remaining baboons encircle the lone hunter and ominously amble towards him.

== Cast ==
- Stanley Baker as Mike Bain
- Stuart Whitman as Brian O'Brien
- Susannah York as Grace Monckton
- Harry Andrews as Grimmelman
- Theodore Bikel as Bondarahkai
- Nigel Davenport as Sturdevant

== Production ==
Joseph E. Levine was keen for Stanley Baker and Cy Endfield to make another film in Africa after the success of Zulu (1964). They initially announced plans to adapt Wilbur Smith's debut novel, When the Lion Feeds, but eventually decided on William Mulvihill's The Sands of Kalahari. Baker persuaded his childhood friend Richard Burton to star along with his wife Elizabeth Taylor, but Taylor was reluctant to film in Africa and demanded more money than Levine was interested in paying.

Burton pulled out and George Peppard and Susannah York were cast instead. However shortly after filming commenced, Peppard left the project (probably for The Blue Max), and Stuart Whitman was flown in as a replacement.

The film was shot on location in the Kalahari Desert, with studio work done at Shepperton Studios in London.

== Reception ==
The film did poorly at the box office and Baker and Endfield never made another film together again.

== See also ==
- Survival film, about the film genre, with a list of related films
