= The Emperor's Club =

2002 American drama film

- Theatrical release poster
- Directed by: Michael Hoffman
- Screenplay by: Neil Tolkin
- Based on: "The Palace Thief" (1994) by Ethan Canin
- Produced by: Marc Abraham; Andrew S. Karsch; Michael O'Neill
- Starring: Kevin Kline; Steven Culp; Embeth Davidtz; Patrick Dempsey; Joel Gretsch; Edward Herrmann; Emile Hirsch; Rob Morrow; Harris Yulin
- Cinematography: Lajos Koltai
- Edited by: Harvey Rosenstock
- Music by: James Newton Howard
- Production companies: Beacon Communications; LivePlanet; Sidney Kimmel Entertainment
- Distributed by: Universal Pictures
- Release dates: September 9, 2002 (TIFF); November 22, 2002 (United States)
- Running time: 109 minutes
- Country: United States
- Language: English
- Budget: $12.5 million
- Box office: $16.3 million

The Emperor's Club is a 2002 American drama film directed by Michael Hoffman and starring Kevin Kline. Based on Ethan Canin's 1994 short story "The Palace Thief", the film follows a prep school teacher and his students at a fictional East Coast boys' prep school, St. Benedict's Academy.

== Plot ==
In the early 1970s, William Hundert is a revered classics teacher at Saint Benedict's, a boys' boarding school for the sons of wealthy families. He begins the new school year by making student Martin Blythe read an ancient plaque hanging over the classroom door that sings the praises of Mesopotamian ruler Shutruk Nahunte, a leader that contributed nothing of value to his kingdom and is virtually forgotten today.

Hundert's disciplined life and classroom are shaken when a new student, Sedgewick Bell, is enrolled in the middle of the term. The underachieving, spoiled son of a U.S. senator from West Virginia frequently disrupts class and does poorly in his homework, and breaks rules by traveling off campus to St. Mary's, a girls' boarding school across the lake. Hundert meets with Hiram Bell to discuss his son's behavior, but Hiram cares only that Sedgewick pass his classes.

When Hundert befriends Sedgewick, his grades improve and he works to earn a spot in the school's annual "Mr. Julius Caesar contest", in which the top three students compete in a public classics quiz. Sedgewick places fourth in the class standings, and Hundert raises his grade to qualify, displacing Martin. Hundert spies Sedgewick using crib notes during the competition, but headmaster Mr. Woodbridge orders him to ignore it since Sedgewick's father is a major donor to the school. Hundert deliberately asks Sedgewick a question on Hamilcar Barca which was not covered in class. It is answered correctly by Deepak Metha, who was reading about Roman wars on his own time. Mehta is crowned "Mr. Julius Caesar". The cheating is never made public, but the trust between Sedgewick and Hundert is broken. Sedgewick returns to his old ways and barely graduates in 1976. Hundert expresses deep disappointment that he failed Sedgewick.

Twenty-five years later, Hundert is poised to become the new headmaster when Woodbridge dies. When a less experienced colleague gets the position due to his fundraising ability, Hundert resigns. He's later told that Sedgewick, now a wealthy corporate CEO, will make a large donation to Saint Benedict's contingent on Hundert hosting a Mr. Julius Caesar rematch. The 1976 graduating class reunites at Sedgewick's resort hotel on the Gold Coast, Long Island and the original trio of contestants begin the competition. Hundert realizes Sedgewick is again cheating, fed answers through an earpiece. Hundert asks a question about Shutruk Nahunte which all the students find laughably easy but Sedgewick is unable to answer it. Deepak's correct answer makes him Mr. Julius Caesar once again.

Sedgewick announces he is following in the footsteps of his deceased father by running for the U.S. Senate. Hundert is appalled that he was used for political grandstanding, and confronts Sedgewick in the men's room. Sedgewick says dishonesty trumps principles in the real world, and that Hundert has let life pass him by. Sedgewick is overheard by his young son, who is shocked to learn the truth about his father. At the hotel bar, Hundert apologizes to Martin for giving his competition spot to Sedgewick years ago.

Awakening to an empty resort, Hundert enters a surprise party held in his honor by his former students, who present him an award engraved with a quote about education. Hundert departs by helicopter, convinced that while he failed with Sedgewick Bell, he succeeded with the other men. He returns to his old job teaching classics to present-day Saint Benedict's modern, coeducational and diverse student body which includes Martin's son, Martin Blythe IV. Hundert spots the older Blythe happily waving to his old teacher through the window, and has the younger Blythe read the plaque above the door.

== Cast ==
- Kevin Kline as William Hundert
- Emile Hirsch as Sedgewick Bell
  - Joel Gretsch as adult Sedgewick
- Embeth Davidtz as Elizabeth
- Rob Morrow as James Ellerby
- Edward Herrmann as Headmaster Woodbridge
- Harris Yulin as Senator Hiram Bell
- Paul Dano as Martin Blythe
  - Steven Culp as adult Martin
- Jesse Eisenberg as Louis Masoudi
  - Patrick Dempsey as adult Louis
- Rishi Mehta as Deepak Mehta
  - Rahul Khanna as adult Deepak
- Caitlin O'Heaney as Mrs. Woodbridge
- Gabriel Millman as Robert Brewster
- Tim Realbuto as Jackson Pheiffer
- Chris Morales as Eugene Field
- Luca Bigini as Copeland Gray
- Michael Coppola as Russell Hall
- Sean Fredricks as Mr. Harris
- Katherine O'Sullivan as The Nun
- Jimmy Walsh as Robert Bell
- Nick Hagelin as Martin Blythe IV

== Production ==
=== Development ===
The film, originally titled The Palace Thief, was first developed at Fine Line Features, with Kevin Kline reportedly in talks to star and direct. The production went into turnaround and was acquired by Universal Pictures. Michael Hoffman, who had previously collaborated with Kline on Soapdish and A Midsummer Night's Dream, was announced to direct.

=== Filming ===
Principal photography took place in New York City from May to June 2001. The school campus scenes were filmed at the Emma Willard School in Troy, New York.

== Reception ==
On review aggregator Rotten Tomatoes, The Emperor's Club holds a 50% approval rating based on 128 reviews with an average rating on 5.80/10. The website's critics consensus reads: "Though Kline is excellent in his portrayal of Hundert, the movie is too dull and sentimental to distinguish itself from other titles in its genre." On Metacritic, the film had an average score of 49 out of 100, based on 32 reviews, indicating "mixed or average reviews".

The performances of Kline and Hirsch were lauded, with some saying the former "manages a mix of quiet joy and melancholic disillusionment within the confines of a very reserved role", and others noting the latter plays Sedgewick with "a intuitive brew of cunning, charm and malice". Roger Ebert gave the film three stars and praised the complexity of Hundert's flawed character, noting that as "a portrait of the escalator that speeds the sons of the rich upward toward power, it is unusually realistic". However, multiple critics pointed out the film is weakened by its sentimentality and muddled messaging. The Chicago Tribune's Michael Wilmington said the film "boasts lots of talent" and has the potential to explore "some unusual themes" about ethics and values, but ultimately gives in to plot contrivances and improbabilities.

David Stratton of At the Movies opined, "It's decently made, decently acted and moderately interesting but, in the end, pretty forgettable. When it finally gets to the point, which is a potentially interesting one about the duplicity of some sections of the Establishment, interest has waned." Many also opined the film hews too closely to the clichés of the "inspirational teacher" film genre.

A.O. Scott of The New York Times said, "The younger actors, especially Mr. Dano and Jesse Eisenberg, as a bright, skittish boy named Masoudi, have the right mix of anxiety and bravado, but the St. Benedict's boys are as thinly conceived as the minor adult characters." He added Hundert "is less a person than a walking moral problem and is in fact more interesting as an ethical puzzle than as a psychological study". Robert Koehler of Variety noted that in the film's third act, the casting of the older students "doesn’t jibe physically with their younger selves."

Others lamented the changes from the original short story. Writing for The Washington Post, Stephen Hunter commented, "Where complexity within the characters is suggested, it's quickly milled out in the generic spirit of sentimentality about the school experience. Where the original ending may have been bittersweet and full of self-recrimination, this ending is triumphant and self-congratulatory. You walk out yearning for the rebellious, grungy untidiness of real kids".

=== Accolades ===
At the 24th Young Artist Awards in 2003, the film received nominations for Best Family Feature Film – Drama, and for Best Performance in a Feature Film – Supporting Young Actor for Emile Hirsch.

== See also ==
- Goodbye, Mr. Chips (1934), a novella by James Hilton about a classics teacher at a British boarding school, exploring his legacy and the lives he touched
- "The Changing of the Guard", a June 1, 1962, episode of The Twilight Zone starring Donald Pleasence as a retiring English teacher at a New England boys' school, who questions whether or not he has made any difference in his students' lives
- Dead Poets Society (1989), a similar drama film set in a boys' preparatory school, about a teacher influencing a class of young men
- Mona Lisa Smile (2003), a similar drama film set in a girls' college, about a teacher influencing a class of young women
- In the House (2012), another film about a complicated instructor–student relationship
