= The Pirates of Penzance (film) =

1983 film directed by Wilford Leach

- Original theatrical poster
- Directed by: Wilford Leach
- Screenplay by: Wilford Leach
- Based on: The Pirates of Penzance by Sir William Schwenck Gilbert
- Produced by: Joseph Papp; Timothy Burrill
- Starring: Kevin Kline; Angela Lansbury; Linda Ronstadt; George Rose; Rex Smith
- Cinematography: Douglas Slocombe
- Edited by: Anne V. Coates
- Music by: Sir Arthur Seymour Sullivan (from The Pirates of Penzance)
- Production companies: St. Michael Finance Limited; Timothy Burrill Productions
- Distributed by: Universal Pictures
- Release dates: February 18, 1983 (United States); August 1983 (United Kingdom)
- Running time: 112 minutes
- Countries: United Kingdom; United States
- Box office: $694,497

The Pirates of Penzance is a 1983 musical romantic comedy swashbuckler film written and directed by Wilford Leach based on Gilbert and Sullivan's 1879 comic opera of the same name. The story takes place in the 1870s and centers around the pirate apprentice, Frederic, who leaves a Penzance-based pirate band of tenderhearted orphans and soon falls in love with Mabel, the daughter of an incompetent Major-General. But it turns out that Frederic was born on Leap day and is still apprenticed to the pirate band until he reaches his 21st birthday in 1940. His alliances shift back and forth between the pirates and "respectable society" until the pirates' maid-of-all-work, Ruth, reveals a fact that saves the day.

The film, starring Kevin Kline, Angela Lansbury, Linda Ronstadt, George Rose, and Rex Smith, is an adaptation of the 1980 Joseph Papp production of Pirates. The original Broadway cast reprised their roles in the film, except that Lansbury replaced Estelle Parsons as Ruth. The minor roles used British actors miming to their Broadway counterparts. Choreography was by Graciela Daniele. It was produced by Papp and filmed at Shepperton Studios in London. Universal Pictures made the unprecedented decision to release the film simultaneously with a release on pay TV, and the film was a box-office bomb, despite generally warm reviews.

== Plot ==
In the 1850s, young Frederic was sent in the care of his nursemaid, Ruth, to be apprenticed to a pilot. But she misunderstood her instructions, being hard of hearing, and apprenticed him instead to the Pirate King. Now turning 21 years old, his service is finished, so he decides to leave the Pirates of Penzance. He has a strong "sense of duty" and vows to lead a blameless life and to exterminate the pirates. Ruth wants him to take her with him, but just then he meets some young maidens, the daughters of Major-General Stanley, and realizes that Ruth is "plain and old".

One of the maidens, Mabel, agrees to rescue him from his life of piracy by offering her love, and Frederic accepts. Soon, however, the pirates return and seize the young ladies, planning to marry them. Their father then arrives and lies to the pirates, telling them that he is an orphan. He knows that the pirates are orphans themselves and never attack another orphan; the pirates let him and his daughters go free.

Later, General Stanley wrestles with his conscience, having told a lie. Mabel and Frederic try to cheer him up, and Frederic has engaged the constabulary to help him defeat the pirates. The police arrive, but they turn out to be timid. Then the Pirate King and Ruth find Frederic alone. They have reviewed the fine print on his apprenticeship indenture and have discovered that he is still a pirate because he was born in a leap year on February 29, and he will not be out of his indentures to the pirates until his 21st birthday in 1940. Mabel agrees to wait for Frederic until then.

The Police return and, hearing the pirates approach, they hide. The pirates arrive and seize the still guilt-ridden Major-General. Mabel coaxes the police to battle the pirates, but they are quickly defeated. However, the Sergeant of Police calls on the pirates to "yield in Queen Victoria's name". The pirates tearfully do so, as they love their queen, and release the Major-General, surrendering to the police. However, Ruth reveals that the pirates are all "noblemen who have gone wrong"; the Major-General pardons them and invites them to resume their parliamentary ranks and to marry his beautiful daughters. All ends happily.

== Cast ==
- Kevin Kline as The Pirate King
- Angela Lansbury as Ruth
- Linda Ronstadt as Mabel Stanley
- George Rose as Major-General Stanley
- Rex Smith as Frederic
- Tony Azito as the Police Sergeant
- David Hatton as Samuel
  - singing voice performed by Stephen Hanan
- Louise Gold as Edith
  - singing voice performed by Alexandra Korey
- Teresa Codling as Kate
  - singing voice performed by Marcie Shaw
- Tilly Vosburgh as Isabel

== Musical numbers ==
1. Overture
2. Pour, oh Pour the Pirate Sherry – Pirates and Samuel
3. When Frederic Was a Little Lad+ – Ruth
4. Oh Better Far to Live and Die++ – Pirate King
5. Oh False One, You Have Deceived Me – Frederic and Ruth
6. Climbing Over Rocky Mountain+ – Major General's Daughters
7. Stop, Ladies, Pray – Frederic and Daughters
8. Oh Is There Not One Maiden Breast+ – Frederic and Daughters
9. Oh Sisters, Deaf to Pity's Name – Mabel and Daughters
10. Poor Wandering One++ – Mabel and Daughters
11. Stay, We Must Not Lose Our Senses – Frederic, Daughters and Pirates
12. Hold Monsters and I Am the Very Model of a Modern Major-General+ – Mabel, Major General and Chorus
13. Act I Finale – Company

1. Oh Dry the Glistening Tear+ – Mabel and Daughters
2. When the Foeman Bares His Steel++ – Sergeant of Police, Daughters and Police
3. Now for the Pirate's Lair – Frederic, King and Ruth
4. When You Had Left Our Pirate Fold+ – Ruth, King and Frederic
5. My Eyes are Fully Open (from Ruddigore) – Frederic, Ruth and King
6. Away, Away, My Heart's on Fire – King, with Frederic and Ruth
7. Stay, Frederic, Stay – Mabel and Frederic
8. Ah, Leave Me Not to Pine – Mabel and Frederic
9. Oh Here Is Love and Here Is Truth – Mabel and Frederic
10. No, I Am Brave+ and Sergeant, Approach+++ – Mabel, Police and Sergeant
11. When a Felon's Not Engaged in His Employment+ – Sergeant and Police
12. A Rollicking Band of Pirates, We – Sergeant, Pirates and Police
13. With Cat Like Tread++ – Pirates and Police
14. Sighing Softly to the River – Major-General and Men
15. Act II Finale++ – Company

Differences from the stage version
+Shortened
++Extended
+++Originally dialogue.
Omitted: "How Beautifully Blue the Sky" and "Sorry her Lot" (from H.M.S. Pinafore)

== Release ==
During its promotional campaign for the film, Universal announced that it would release it in the US on February 18, 1983, simultaneously in theaters and on subscription television, an unprecedented strategy for Hollywood that was not repeated until 2020, when the same studio gave the animated film Trolls World Tour a similar treatment due to the COVID-19 pandemic. The decision was met with immediate resistance from major theater chains, all of which refused to play Pirates. One theater chain head remarked, "I would not have played it had they given it to me for nothing. I didn't invest millions of dollars in brick and mortar to play films simultaneously with television. Others agreed: "As far as we're concerned, the picture doesn't exist. We will not play it [simultaneously] with TV. We feel we have earned the right to play it first." and "our policy is never to play after cable". Henry Plitt commented, "I don't see any reason to finance our own debacle."

Universal stated that it made the decision because Pirates was a relatively small release compared to the Superman and Rocky films of the same period: "We don't see the pay-per-view showing as competitive with theaters. Cable viewers are older, infrequent moviegoers. If they like the film, the pay-per-view showing will have served as a sneak preview. Papp also defended the decision, saying that he was "interested in reaching a mass audience. I decided it was exciting, a little dangerous and a marvelous risk."

== Reception ==
=== Box office ===
On its opening weekend in the US, the film grossed $255,496 from 91 venues, all of which were small locations that traditionally played discount fare; the reduction in theater booking was a result of major chains refusing to show the film due to its simultaneous telecast on pay television. The film ranked fourteenth at the box office during that weekend. At the end of its run, its worldwide theatrical gross totaled $694,497. The film was a box office bomb, and some audience members found it disappointing in comparison with the Broadway production. Despite the film's poor theatrical performance in the US, 9% of the 550,000 subscriber base reported by the pay television network ON TV purchased the film.

=== Critical reception ===
The film received generally positive reviews from critics. Rotten Tomatoes reports an 80% score based on 15 reviews, with an average rating of 6.9/10. Gene Siskel of the Chicago Tribune remarked that "having sat through four incarnations of this Joseph Papp production, the original Broadway cast, the Chicago road company, the premiere telecast here on the pay channel ON TV, and Saturday's matinee at the 400 Theater, The Pirates of Penzance earns my respect as a durable and satisfying entertainment. This Gilbert and Sullivan chestnut, which lampoons British manners, is great fun in any form. And reading the intricate libretto brings a laugh, too." Janet Maslin had a more mixed review to offer the film in The New York Times:

The Pirates of Penzance has been made into a cheerful movie, but it isn't nearly as deft or distinctive here as it was on stage. The principal cast is still on hand, and still a delight, with the felicitous addition of Angela Lansbury. Mr. Leach's stage production was buoyant and charming. But in adapting it for film, he has too infrequently seen fit to leave well enough alone. ... [T]he irreverence seemed wittier and less broad on the stage than it does here, undermined as it is by awkward camera angles, fussy scenery and a general loss of spontaneity. Spontaneity, or at least the illusion of it, was one of the stage production's greatest assets. ... [The individual performers] work better here as part of the group than they do individually, and Mr. Leach hasn't given them enough opportunity to intermingle. ... The movie is best at its most full-bodied. Especially rousing are the group rendition of With Catlike Tread, Mr. Rose's show-stopping entrance, A Policeman's Lot Is Not a Happy One, the pretty duets pairing Miss Ronstadt and Mr. Smith, and any exchange featuring Miss Lansbury. Some of the less melodic, more precious scenes are notably weaker. ... [T]here are stretches during which those not fully conversant with the operetta will have difficulty making out its text.

== Home media ==
The film was released on VHS in 1984 and on DVD in 2010.

== See also ==
- The Pirate Movie – 1982 adaptation of the opera starring Christopher Atkins and Kristy McNichol.
