= Daddie's Little Piece of Dresden China =

Daddy's Little Piece of Dresden China
- Directed by: Karen Watson
- Produced by: West Surrey College of Art and Design
- Music by: Meredith Monk; Arvo Part
- Release date: 1988
- Running time: 8 min
- Country: UK
- Language: English

Daddy's Little Bit of Dresden China (incorrectly listed on several websites, including IMDb, as Daddie's Little Piece of Dresden China) is a 1988 Bafta nominated short film by British animator Karen Watson. The film uses mixed media animation and unconventional narrative to explore the issues of domestic violence and child abuse from within the confines of the patriarchal family unit. Based on Watson's own childhood experience, the film was made in an attempt to highlight the (then taboo) issue of sexual abuse and the social myths surrounding it. Several styles of animation are used: most of the scenes taking place in Watson's house are made using puppet animation, while other parts of the film – most notably some scenes taking place in a pub – render the characters as collages of torn-up photographs against a black background. A short sequence at the start, setting the scene with a modified retelling of Snow White, uses more conventional-looking drawn animation.

The puppets in the home sequences are made from household objects: the young Karen Watson is made from feathers with a doll's house vase as a head, her mother is made from miniature kitchen utensils with a model bunch of grapes as a head, while the father is made from scrap metal and has a vice-like beak. In addition, Karen Watson is often shown with a piece of tape covering her mouth, while her mother sometimes has tape over her eyes.

The pub scenes – the only parts of the film in which the characters talk, as the home scenes are narrated by the adult Karen Watson – involve a group of men discussing sexually abusive fathers, and are used to underline popular conceptions and misconceptions of the issue ("All these lasses gotta do is say no", ventures one man). The scenes convey the theme of sexism symbolically: the bartender turns into a giant and caresses a tiny barmaid, while a group of card players sprinkle cigarette ash on pictures of naked women.

The film was shot on 16 mm film and runs eight minutes.
