= Kevin Kline =

American actor (born 1947)

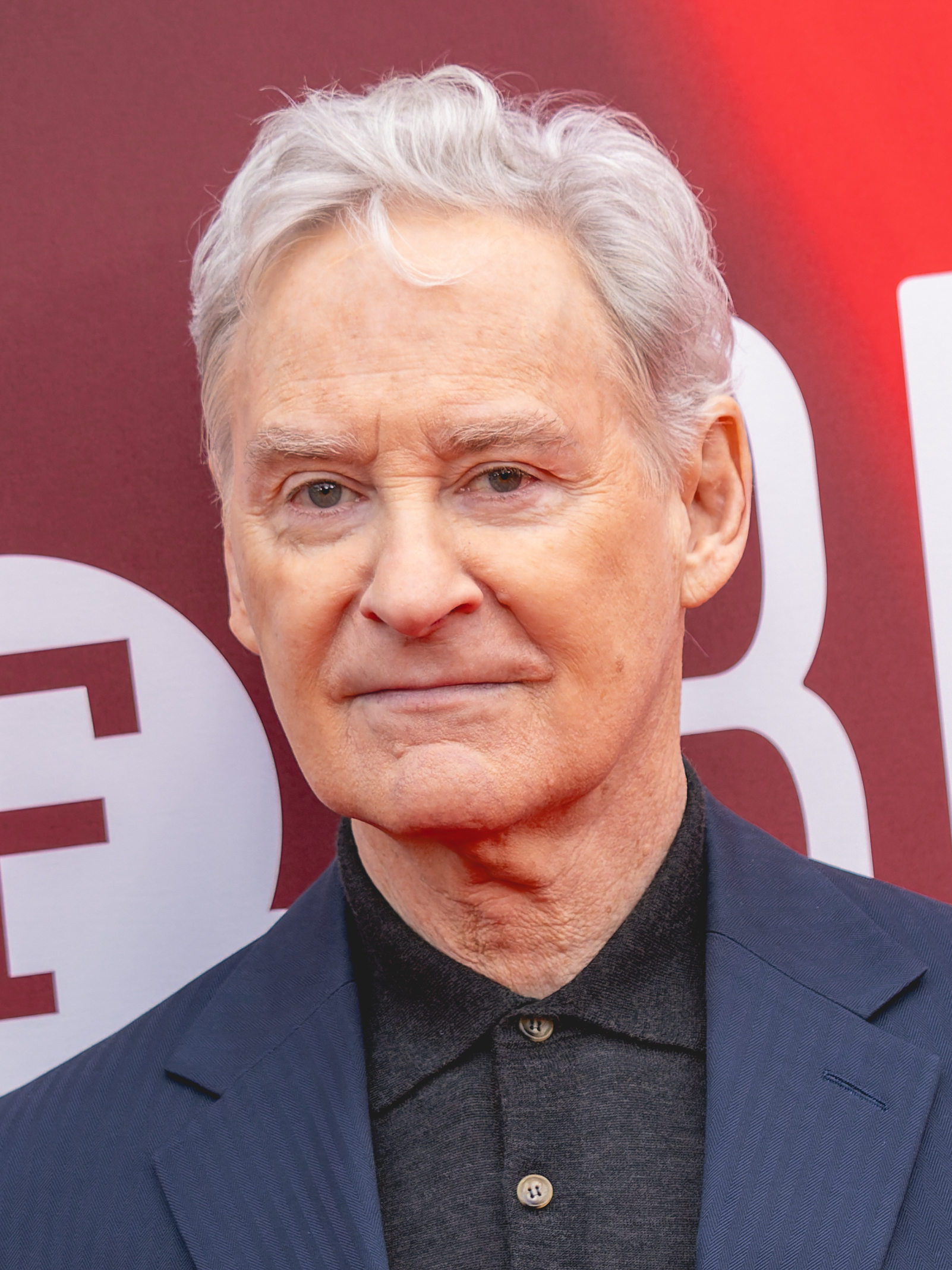
- Kline in 2024
- Born: Kevin Delaney Kline; October 24, 1947 (age 79); St. Louis, Missouri, U.S.
- Education: Indiana University Bloomington (BA); Juilliard School (GrDip)
- Occupation: Actor
- Years active: 1970–present
- Notable work: Performances
- Spouse: Phoebe Cates (m. 1989)
- Children: Owen Kline; Greta Kline
- Awards: Full list

Kevin Delaney Kline (born October 24, 1947) is an American actor. In a career spanning over five decades, he has become a prominent leading man across both stage and screen. His accolades include an Academy Award and three Tony Awards, along with nominations for two British Academy Film Awards, two Primetime Emmy Awards, and six Golden Globes. In 2003, he was inducted into the American Theatre Hall of Fame.

Kline began his acting career on stage in 1972 with The Acting Company and gained prominence for his numerous performances with The Public Theater and in New York Shakespeare Festival. He has gone on to win three Tony Awards for his work on Broadway, including wins in Best Featured Actor in a Musical in On the Twentieth Century (1978), Best Actor in a Musical for The Pirates of Penzance (1981), and Best Actor in a Play for the revival of Noël Coward's Present Laughter (2017). He was Tony-nominated for playing John Falstaff in Henry IV (2004).

Kline made his film debut in Sophie's Choice (1982) before winning the Academy Award for Best Supporting Actor for his comedic role in A Fish Called Wanda (1988). He also acted in The Big Chill (1983), The Pirates of Penzance (1983), Silverado (1985), Cry Freedom (1987), The January Man (1989), Soapdish (1991), Grand Canyon (1991), Chaplin (1992), Consenting Adults (1992), Dave (1993), The Ice Storm (1997), In & Out (1997), Life as a House (2001), The Emperor's Club (2002), De-Lovely (2004), A Prairie Home Companion (2006), Last Vegas (2013) and Beauty and the Beast (2017). He also voiced roles in The Hunchback of Notre Dame (1996) and The Road to El Dorado (2000).

On television, Kline started his career in the soap opera Search for Tomorrow (1976). He received nomination for the Primetime Emmy Award for Outstanding Lead Actor in a Limited Series or Movie for playing the title role in the PBS production of Cyrano de Bergerac (2008). He starred in the Apple TV+ miniseries Disclaimer (2024). Since 2011, he has voiced Calvin Fischoeder in the animated sitcom Bob's Burgers.

== Early life and education ==
Kline was born on October 24, 1947, in St. Louis, Missouri, to Margaret Agnes Kirk and Robert Joseph Kline (1909–1996). His father was a classical music lover and amateur opera singer who owned The Record Bar, a record store in St. Louis that opened in 1942. He also sold toys during the 1960s and 1970s; his father's family owned Kline's Inc., a department store chain. Kevin Kline described his mother as the "dramatic theatrical character in our family". His father was of German-Jewish descent, and his mother Catholic; Kline was raised in his mother's faith. He has an older sister, Kate, and two younger brothers, Alexander and Christopher.

He graduated from the Saint Louis Priory School in 1965. In 1997, the school named its new auditorium the Kevin Kline Theater. At its dedication, he performed selections from Shakespeare as a benefit. He attended Indiana University Bloomington, where he was a classmate of actor Jonathan Banks. He began studying composing and conducting music, but switched to a theater and speech major for his last two years, and graduated in 1970. He said: "When I switched to the Theater Department, all I did was theater... I could barely make it to class because this was my passion." While an undergraduate, he was a co-founder of the Vest Pocket Players, an off-campus theatrical troupe.

== Acting career ==
=== 1970–1981: Rise to prominence ===
In 1970, Kline won a scholarship to the newly formed drama division of the Juilliard School in New York. In 1972, he joined fellow Juilliard graduates, including Patti LuPone and David Ogden Stiers, and formed the City Center Acting Company (now The Acting Company), under the aegis of John Houseman. The Company traveled across the U.S. performing Shakespeare's plays, other classical works, and the musical The Robber Bridegroom, founding one of the most widely praised groups in American repertory theatre. At Juilliard, he studied singing with Beverley Peck Johnson.

In 1976, Kline left The Acting Company and settled in New York City, doing a brief appearance as Woody Reed in the now-defunct soap opera Search for Tomorrow. He returned to the stage in 1977 to play Clym Yeobright opposite Donna Theodore as Eustacia Vye in The Hudson Guild Theater production of Dance on a Country Grave, Kelly Hamilton's musical version of Thomas Hardy's The Return of the Native. In 1978, he played Bruce Granit, a matinée idol caricature, in Harold Prince's On the Twentieth Century, for which he won his first Tony Award.

In 1980, he appeared with Linda Ronstadt, Rex Smith and Patricia Routledge in the New York Shakespeare Festival's Central Park production of Gilbert and Sullivan's The Pirates of Penzance, which moved to Broadway and won Kline another Tony Award for Best Leading Actor in a Musical for his comically dashing portrayal of the Pirate King. In 1983 he played the role in a film version of the musical, also with Ronstadt, Smith and Angela Lansbury, which had a limited theatrical release.

In the ensuing years, Kline appeared many times in New York Shakespeare Festival productions of Shakespeare plays, including starring roles in Richard III (1983), Much Ado About Nothing (1988), Henry V (1984), and two productions of Hamlet, in 1986 and 1990 (which he also directed). A videotape of the 1990 production has aired on PBS. Kline was dubbed "the American Olivier" by The New York Times theater critic Frank Rich for his stage acting.

=== 1982–1999: Breakthrough and stardom ===
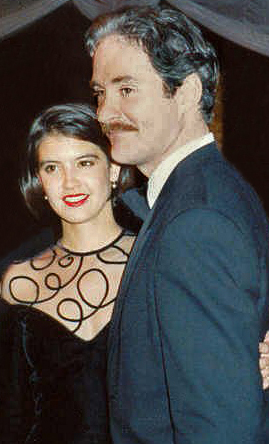
Kline and his wife Phoebe Cates at the Academy Awards (1989)

Kline finally ventured into film in 1982 in Sophie's Choice. He won the coveted role of the tormented and moody Nathan opposite Meryl Streep. The New York Times film critic Janet Maslin wrote of Kline's performance, "Mr. Kline, whose Nathan convincingly demonstrates the greatest of tenderness toward Sophie, is also called upon to rail at her mercilessly. In the tender scenes Mr. Kline makes himself very appealing; in the cruel ones, he does the best he can to affect a viciousness that, even on the page, seemed less than fully convincing." Kline was nominated for the Golden Globe Award for New Star of the Year – Actor and the BAFTA Award for Most Outstanding Newcomer To Film.

During the 1980s and early to mid-1990s, Kline made several films with director Lawrence Kasdan, starting with The Big Chill (1983). The film revolves around friends from college reuniting after the death of a friend. Kline co-stars alongside Glenn Close, Jeff Goldblum, and William Hurt. The film was a critical and commercial success. He reunited with Kasdan with the western film Silverado (1985) where he starred with Kevin Costner, Rosanna Arquette, and John Cleese. He then portrayed Donald Woods in Richard Attenborough's Cry Freedom (1987) opposite Denzel Washington about the friendship between activist Stephen Biko and editor Donald Woods.

Newsday critic Lynn Darling wrote on July 13, 1988, that Kline "has proved himself to be one of the most talented and versatile American actors of his generation." In 1989, Kline played a painfully inept American ex-CIA thug in the British comedy A Fish Called Wanda, opposite John Cleese's genteel British barrister and Jamie Lee Curtis' femme fatale/con woman. For his performance, he was nominated for the BAFTA Award for Best Actor in a Leading Role and won the Academy Award for Best Supporting Actor. In 2000, the American Film Institute ranked the film 21st on AFI's 100 Years... 100 Laughs. Kline continued to take comedic and dramatic roles in The January Man (1989), I Love You to Death (1990), Soapdish (1991), Grand Canyon (1991), Chaplin (1992), and French Kiss (1995).

In 1993, Kline had his first voice-acting role in The Nutcracker, and starred in Dave, a political comedy directed by Ivan Reitman and co-starring Charles Grodin, Sigourney Weaver and Ben Kingsley. In 1996, he played the voice role of Captain Phoebus in the Disney animated film The Hunchback of Notre Dame. He starred as the father of a dysfunctional family in Ang Lee's drama film The Ice Storm (1997). He portrayed an English literature teacher who is publicly outed when his student thanks him in his Academy Award acceptance speech in the Frank Oz comedy In & Out (1997). The film was inspired by Tom Hanks' acceptance speech for Philadelphia (1993). Kline was nominated for the Golden Globe Award for Best Actor in a Motion Picture – Musical or Comedy for his performance. In 1998, he received a star on the St. Louis Walk of Fame.

In 1999, Kline played opposite Will Smith in the steampunk Western film Wild Wild West. On Metacritic, the film has a score of 38 out of 100 based on 25 critics, indicating "generally unfavorable reviews". The film ended its theatrical run on October 10, 1999, after five months, having grossed $113,804,681 domestically and $108,300,000 overseas for a worldwide total of $222,104,681 against a production budget of $170 million.

He also played the hapless Bottom in the 1999 A Midsummer Night's Dream, which was written, produced, and directed by Michael Hoffman, based on the play of the same name by William Shakespeare and featuring Michelle Pfeiffer as Titania, Rupert Everett as Oberon, Stanley Tucci as Puck, and Calista Flockhart, Christian Bale, Anna Friel and Dominic West as the four lovers. Kline was praised for his portrayal of the egotistical but good-natured craftsman who has pretensions to a higher social position.

=== 2000–2016: Established actor ===
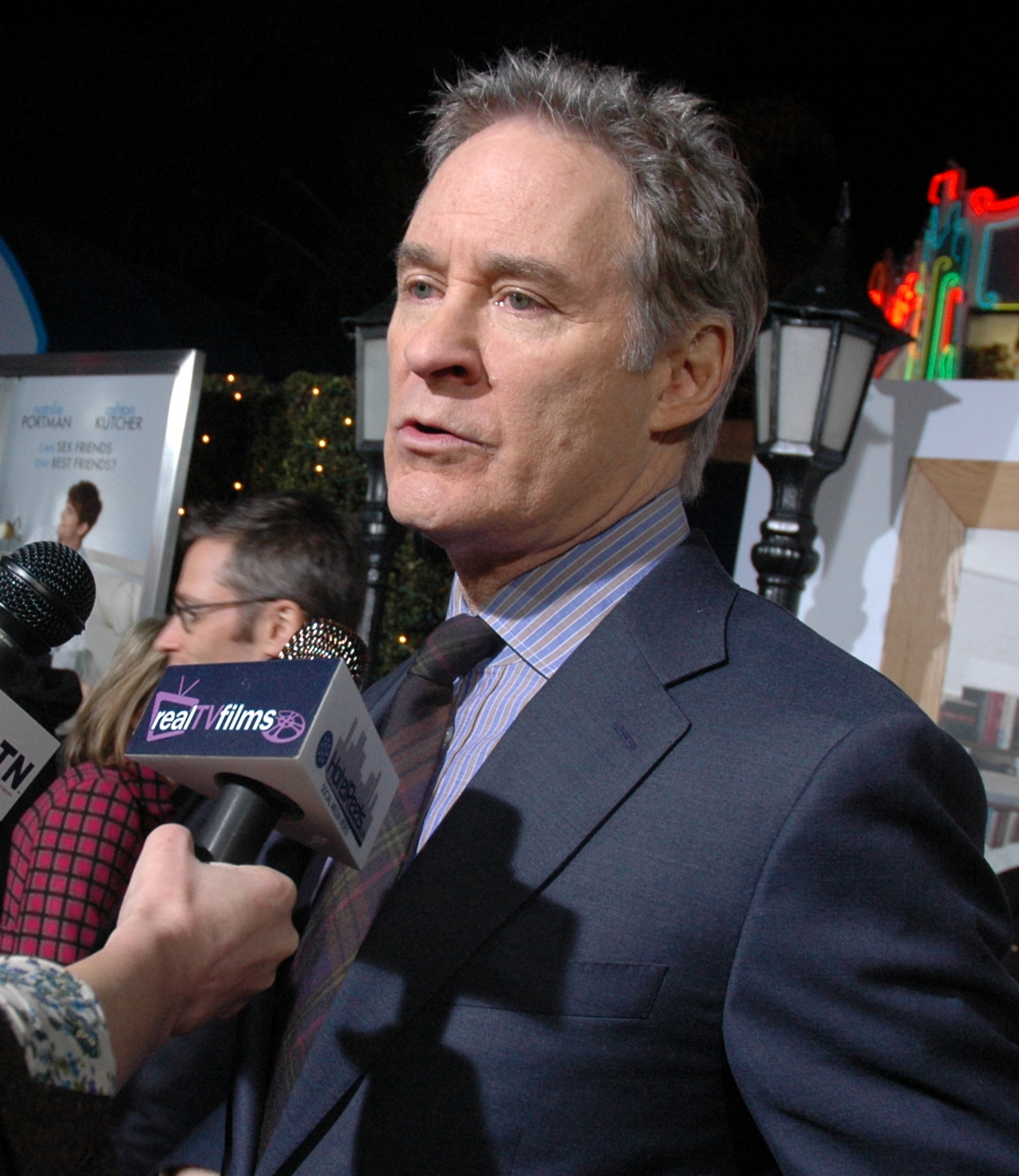
Kline at the film premiere of No Strings Attached in January 2011

Kline voiced Tulio in the DreamWorks animated film The Road to El Dorado (2000) opposite Kenneth Branagh's Miguel. The film is an adventure comedy featuring original songs written by Elton John. The film received mixed reviews but has since become a cult classic. The following year he starred in the Irwin Winkler drama Life as a House (2001) starring Kristin Scott Thomas, Hayden Christensen, and Mary Steenburgen. He reprised his role as Captain Phoebus in The Hunchback of Notre Dame II (2002). That same year he portrayed a prep school teacher in The Emperor's Club (2002). The film was compared to that of Goodbye, Mr. Chips (1934) and Dead Poets Society (1989). He then portrayed Cole Porter in the musical biopic De-Lovely (2004) for which he was nominated for the Golden Globe Award for Best Actor in a Motion Picture – Musical or Comedy.

During this period, Kline appeared in numerous comedy films such as The Pink Panther (2006) opposite Steve Martin as well as the romantic comedy films Definitely, Maybe starring Ryan Reynolds and No Strings Attached (2011) with Natalie Portman and Ashton Kutcher. He also played Guy Noir in Robert Altman's final film, A Prairie Home Companion (2006). Kline starred alongside Meryl Streep, Lily Tomlin, Tommy Lee Jones, and Woody Harrelson.

He was inducted in the American Theatre Hall of Fame in 2003. He also appeared in a Lincoln Center production that combined the two parts of Henry IV on Broadway at the Vivian Beaumont Theatre in 2003 as Falstaff, and was nominated for the 2004 Tony Award for Actor in a Play. In December 2004, Kline became the 2,272nd recipient of a star on the Hollywood Walk of Fame, for his contributions to the motion picture industry, located at 7000 Hollywood Boulevard.

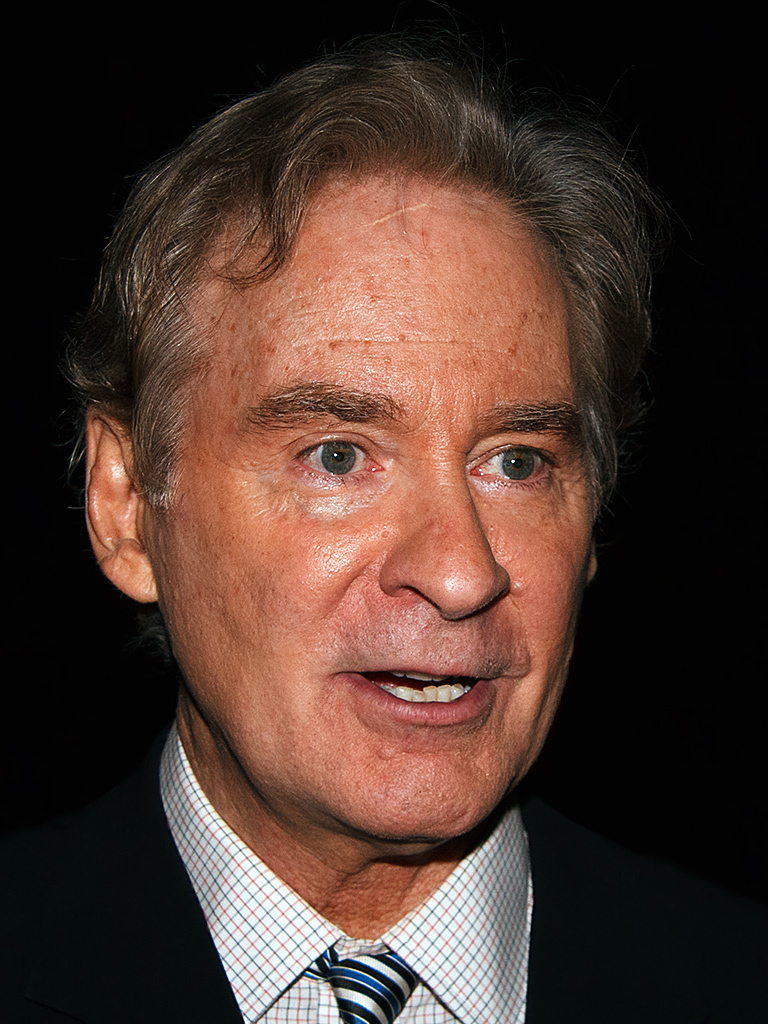
Kline at the 2013 Toronto International Film Festival

Kline played the title role in King Lear at the Public Theater and took the lead role in a Broadway production of Cyrano de Bergerac opposite Jennifer Garner. It was forced to temporarily close after only eleven performances as a result of the Broadway stagehands' strike, but subsequently reopened. Cyrano was filmed in 2008 and aired as part of PBS's Great Performances series. In January 2008, Kline won the Actor Award for Outstanding Performance by a Male Actor in a Miniseries or Television Movie for his performance as the melancholic lord Jaques in Kenneth Branagh's film As You Like It, adapted from Shakespeare's play of the same name. It premiered theatrically in 2006 in Europe and was sent straight to HBO in the United States. Kline's film The Conspirator premiered during the Toronto International Film Festival in 2010 and was described as an "old-fashioned historical thriller." It was well received by most critics. Kline starred in the 2012 comedy Darling Companion with Diane Keaton.

=== 2017–present ===
In 2017, Kline returned to Broadway as Garry Essendine in a revival of Noël Coward's comedic play Present Laughter. He received rave reviews, with Marilyn Stasio writing, "Whatever would we do without Kevin Kline? In an age of lesser stars, he's a bona fide matinee idol of the ideal age and with the urbane sensibility to do justice to sophisticated scribes like Noël Coward." He won the Outer Critics Circle Award for Outstanding Actor in a Play, the Drama Desk Award for Outstanding Actor in a Play, and his third Tony Award (Best Actor in a Play).

That year, he also played Maurice in the musical live-action adaptation of Disney's Beauty and the Beast, directed by Bill Condon and co-starring with Emma Watson and Dan Stevens. The film received positive reviews and grossed $1.2 billion worldwide, making it the highest-grossing live-action musical film, the second highest-grossing film of 2017, and the 27th highest-grossing film of all time. He also voiced Calvin Fischoeder in the animated comedy series Bob's Burgers (2011–present), for which he earned a Primetime Emmy nomination. He has reprised his role in the latter's theatrical feature The Bob's Burgers Movie (2022).

In 2021, it was announced that Kline would star with Cate Blanchett on Alfonso Cuaron's Apple TV+ series Disclaimer.

== Personal life ==
Kline met actress Phoebe Cates in 1983. They began dating in 1985 and married on March 5, 1989, in a private New York wedding. They live on the Upper East Side of Manhattan in New York City. They have two children: Owen Joseph Kline (born 1991) and Greta Kline (born 1994), who fronts the band Frankie Cosmos.

The Kevin Kline Awards honor theatre professionals in St. Louis in an array of categories, including best actor and actress, set design, choreography, and new play or musical.

== Acting credits ==
Kline's career spans over five decades and includes collaborations with some of the most acclaimed filmmakers and actors of his time.

Selected credits:

- Sophie's Choice (1982)
- The Pirates of Penzance (1983)
- The Big Chill (1983)
- Silverado (1985)
- Cry Freedom (1987)
- A Fish Called Wanda (1988)
- I Love You to Death (1990)
- Soapdish (1991)
- Grand Canyon (1991)
- Chaplin (1992)
- Dave (1993)
- French Kiss (1995)
- The Hunchback of Notre Dame (1996)
- The Ice Storm (1997)
- Fierce Creatures (1997)
- In & Out (1997)
- A Midsummer Night's Dream (1999)
- Wild Wild West (1999)
- The Road to El Dorado (2000)
- The Anniversary Party (2001)
- Life as a House (2001)
- The Hunchback of Notre Dame II (2002)
- The Emperor's Club (2002)
- De-Lovely (2004)
- The Pink Panther (2006)
- A Prairie Home Companion (2006)
- As You Like It (2006)
- Definitely, Maybe (2008)
- The Tale of Despereaux (2008)
- Queen to Play (original title Joueuse) (2009)
- No Strings Attached (2011)
- The Conspirator (2011)
- Darling Companion (2012)
- Last Vegas (2013)
- The Last of Robin Hood (2013)
- My Old Lady (2014)
- Ricki and the Flash (2015)
- Beauty and the Beast (2017)
- The Bob's Burgers Movie (2022)
- A Big Bold Beautiful Journey (2025)

== Awards and nominations ==
Kline's numerous accolades include an Academy Award, an Actor Award, four Drama Desk Awards, and three Tony Awards, as well as nominations for two BAFTA Awards, two Primetime Emmy Awards, and six Golden Globes.
