= In & Out (film) =

1997 comedy film directed by Frank Oz

- Theatrical release poster
- Directed by: Frank Oz
- Written by: Paul Rudnick
- Produced by: G. Mac Brown; Scott Rudin; Suzanne Santry; Adam Schroeder
- Starring: Kevin Kline; Joan Cusack; Matt Dillon; Debbie Reynolds; Wilford Brimley; Bob Newhart; Tom Selleck
- Cinematography: Rob Hahn
- Edited by: Daniel P. Hanley; John Jympson
- Music by: Marc Shaiman
- Production company: Spelling Films
- Distributed by: Paramount Pictures
- Release date: September 19, 1997
- Running time: 92 minutes
- Country: United States
- Language: English
- Budget: $35 million
- Box office: $63.9 million

In & Out is a 1997 American comedy film directed by Frank Oz, written by Paul Rudnick, and starring Kevin Kline, Tom Selleck, Joan Cusack, Matt Dillon, Debbie Reynolds, Bob Newhart, Shalom Harlow, and Wilford Brimley. The film follows a harried high school teacher (Kline) who, just days before his wedding, battles rumors of his homosexuality in his small Midwestern hometown after one of his former students (Dillon) outs him on national television, prompting him to question his own sexual orientation.

Inspired by an emotional Academy Award acceptance speech by Tom Hanks, the film became one of mainstream Hollywood's first few attempts at a comedic "gay movie" of its era, and was widely noted at the time for a 12-second kiss between Kline and Selleck. In & Out was released by Paramount Pictures on September 19, 1997. The film was a commercial and critical success, as it earned about $63.9 million worldwide while receiving praise for its performances, particularly those of Kline and Cusack, who was nominated for the Academy Award for Best Supporting Actress for her performance.

== Plot ==
Howard Brackett is a well-liked English literature teacher, living a quiet life in the fictional town of Greenleaf, Indiana, with his fiancée and fellow teacher Emily Montgomery, who has low self-esteem and recently lost weight for their imminent wedding. Although none the wiser, Howard embodies gay stereotypes such as his love of romantic literature, his fandom of Barbra Streisand, and his chaste three-year relationship with Emily.

The town is filled with anticipation over the nomination of Howard's former student Cameron Drake in the Best Actor category at the Academy Awards for his portrayal of a gay soldier in To Serve and Protect. Cameron wins, and, in his acceptance speech, he thanks Howard, dedicates the award to him, and concludes by outing him as a gay man.

The announcement stuns Howard and his family, fiancée, friends, students, and co-workers. In disbelief and indignation he angrily reassures those who know him that he is heterosexual. His life becomes a media circus as reporters invade his hometown and harass him for interviews following the awards night telecast. Howard finds himself under greater scrutiny by his boss, Principal Tom Halliwell, who is uncomfortable with the attention being brought to the school.

The reporters leave after getting their story, except for on-camera entertainment reporter Peter Malloy, who wants to cover Howard's wedding. Howard confesses to a priest who recommends he sleep with Emily in order to prove his heterosexuality, but Howard finds he cannot go through with it due to his conflicting emotions and Emily's concern for his well-being.

Howard crosses paths with Peter, who reveals that he is gay and shares his own experience in coming out to his family. Howard insists that he is not gay, but to his shock Peter kisses him and he enjoys it. Afterwards, Howard tries to use a self-help audio cassette about being a "real" man to assert his heterosexuality, but finally gives up when it fails to work.

During the wedding ceremony, Emily recites her vow without hesitation, but when prompted by the minister to give his vow, Howard finally comes out as gay instead, breaking Emily's heart and canceling the wedding. Peter is proud of Howard who in turn is angry with himself for hurting Emily.

The school fires Howard for coming out but still allows him to attend the graduation ceremony to support his students and sit on stage with his former co-workers. Having learned of the ensuing media blitz, Cameron returns to his hometown with his supermodel girlfriend and comes to the ceremony.

When Cameron learns that his former teacher became ineligible for the "Teacher of the Year" award upon being dismissed, he publicly questions if firing Howard is truly what the community wanted. A student Howard helped get into college proclaims himself to be gay, and his classmates show their support by joining him to proclaim themselves to be gay as well. Howard's family follows suit, as do his friends, and all the townsfolk assembled. Although Howard does not win "Teacher of the Year", Cameron presents him with his Oscar to the cheers of the crowd.

Howard's wedding-crazy mother finally gets a wedding—her own, when she and her husband renew their vows. Howard, Peter and the rest of the townsfolk attend the reception, where everyone dances to the Village People song "Macho Man". Among the crowd are Emily and Cameron, who appear to have begun a relationship.

== Cast ==
- Kevin Kline as Howard Brackett
- Tom Selleck as Peter Malloy
- Joan Cusack as Emily Montgomery
- Matt Dillon as Cameron Drake
- Debbie Reynolds as Bernice Brackett
- Wilford Brimley as Frank Brackett
- Gregory Jbara as Walter Brackett
- Shalom Harlow as Sonya
- Shawn Hatosy as Jack
- Zak Orth as Mike
- Bob Newhart as Tom Halliwell
- Lauren Ambrose as Vicky
- Alexandra Holden as Meredith
- Deborah Rush as Ava Blazer
- Lewis J. Stadlen as Edward Kenrow
- J. Smith-Cameron as Trina Paxton
- Kate McGregor-Stewart as Aunt Becky
- Debra Monk as Mrs. Lester
- Ernie Sabella as Aldo Hooper
- John Cunningham as the Voice on "Be a Man" Tape
- Gus Rogerson as Danny
- Dan Hedaya as a Military Attorney
- Joseph Maher as Father Tim
- William Parry as Fred Mooney
- William Duell as Emmett Wilson
- Alice Drummond as Aunt Susie
- Richard Woods as Revered Morgan
- Kevin Chamberlin as Carl Mickley
- Wally Dunn as Cousin Lenny
- Larry Clarke as Cousin Ernie
- June Squibb as Cousin Ellen
- Becky Ann Baker as Darlene
- Selma Blair as Cousin Linda
- Adam LeFevre and Bill Camp as Bachelor Party Guests
- Whoopi Goldberg as Herself
- Glenn Close as Herself
- Jay Leno as Himself

== Production ==
In & Out was inspired by actor Tom Hanks's 1994 Academy Awards acceptance speech for Philadelphia, in which Hanks tearfully acknowledged his high school drama teacher, Rawley Farnsworth, and his former classmate, John Gilkerson, referring to them as "two of the finest gay Americans, two wonderful men that I had the good fortune to be associated with." This spontaneous and heartfelt tribute served as the conceptual catalyst for screenwriter Paul Rudnick, who developed the film's premise around a small-town teacher who is inadvertently "outed" following a similar public moment.

Principal photography for In & Out was directed by Frank Oz and took place primarily during late 1996 and early 1997 across several locations in Pennsylvania, New Jersey, New York, and California. Selected for its "beautiful auditorium, a great gymnasium" and other aesthetic qualities, the Pompton Lakes High School in Pompton Lakes, New Jersey was used extensively as a filming location. Further filming was done in Northport, New York, located on the north shore of Long Island in Suffolk County. According to Oz, production was temporarily halted when much of the cast and crew contracted influenza, recalling that "we all got sick [...] because we all got the flu."

Despite an otherwise smooth shoot, reports later emerged of interpersonal tension between Oz and actor Wilford Brimley, though neither party has publicly discussed the nature of their disagreement. Joan Cusack was heavily pregnant during the later stages of production in 1997, with her son Dylan John eventually being born in June 1997. The fact that she was pregnant was concealed, with Women's Wear Daily noting in 1998 that the pregnancies of Julianne Moore and Teri Hatcher were similarly concealed in recent films of theirs from 1997.

== Music ==
=== Soundtrack ===
In & Out Soundtrack

Soundtrack album by Various Artists
- Released: September 23, 1997
- Genre: Soundtrack
- Label: Motown

At first, Frank Oz asked Miles Goodman to do the music for In & Out. Goodman, who composed several of Oz's previous films, died before he could do so.

A soundtrack was released on Tuesday, September 23, 1997, featuring previously recorded songs as well as Marc Shaiman's instrumental music composed for the film.

1. "I Will Survive" - Diana Ross
2. "Wedding Preparations" (instrumental)
3. "Everything's Coming up Roses" - Ethel Merman
4. "'To Serve and Protect'" (instrumental)
5. "Howard Is Outed" (instrumental)
6. "The Morning After" (instrumental)
7. "The Bachelor Party" (instrumental)
8. "Interviews with Townsfolk" (instrumental)
9. "Homosection" (instrumental)
10. "I Don't" (instrumental)
11. "Mom & Dad" (instrumental)
12. "Cameron & Emily" (instrumental)
13. "Crazy" - Patsy Cline
14. "Teacher of the Year/People/The Wedding" (instrumental)
15. "Macho Man" - Village People

== Reception ==
=== Box office ===
The film did well at the box office, grossing $15,019,821 in its opening weekend and $63,856,929 over its entire theatrical run.

=== Critical reception ===
In & Out was well received by critics. The film has a 74% approval rating on Rotten Tomatoes based on 58 reviews, with an average rating of 6.9/10; the site's consensus states: "It doesn't always find comfortable ground between broad comedy and social commentary, but lively performances—especially from Kevin Kline and Joan Cusack—enrich In & Out's mixture of laughs and sexual tolerance." On Metacritic the film has a rating of 70 based on reviews from 18 critics.

The performances were widely praised, especially Cusack, who earned an Oscar nod, and Kline. The film also gained attention for depicting homosexuality in a "mainstream" comedy about "Middle America," which, Rita Kempley Howe wrote in The Washington Post, "manages to simultaneously flaunt and flout gay stereotypes." Critics also noted its generally asexual treatment of homosexuality: Janet Maslin commented in The New York Times that the film is not one "to associate gayness with actual sex," while TV Guide quipped that it "finally gets discussion about gay people out of the bedroom and into the record store." Despite generally positive reviews, several critics, even those who were complimentary, felt that the ending was weak and did not live up to the rest of the film.

=== Accolades ===
| Award | Category | Nominee(s) | Result | Ref. |
|---|---|---|---|---|
| 20/20 Awards | Best Actress in a Supporting Role | Joan Cusack | Nominated | |
| Academy Awards | Best Supporting Actress | Joan Cusack | Nominated | |
| American Comedy Awards | Funniest Supporting Actress in a Motion Picture | Joan Cusack | Won | |
| Artios Awards | Best Casting for Feature Film – Comedy | Margery Simkin | Nominated | |
| Awards Circuit Community Awards | Best Actress in a Supporting Role | Joan Cusack | Nominated | |
| Blockbuster Entertainment Awards | Favorite Actor – Comedy | Kevin Kline | Nominated | |
| Blockbuster Entertainment Awards | Favorite Actress – Comedy | Joan Cusack | Nominated | |
| Blockbuster Entertainment Awards | Favorite Supporting Actor – Comedy | Tom Selleck | Nominated | |
| Blockbuster Entertainment Awards | Favorite Supporting Actress – Comedy | Debbie Reynolds | Nominated | |
| Boston Society of Film Critics Awards | Best Supporting Actress | Joan Cusack | 2nd Place | |
| Chicago Film Critics Association Awards | Best Supporting Actress | Joan Cusack | Nominated | |
| Chlotrudis Awards | Best Supporting Actress | Joan Cusack | Won | |
| Critics' Choice Awards | Best Supporting Actress | Joan Cusack | Won | |
| GLAAD Media Awards | Outstanding Film – Wide Release | | Won | |
| Golden Globe Awards | Best Actor in a Motion Picture – Musical or Comedy | Kevin Kline | Nominated | |
| Golden Globe Awards | Best Supporting Actress – Motion Picture | Joan Cusack | Nominated | |
| MTV Movie Awards | Best Kiss | Kevin Kline and Tom Selleck | Nominated | |
| New York Film Critics Circle Awards | Best Supporting Actress | Joan Cusack | Won | |
| Online Film & Television Association Awards | Best Comedy/Musical Actor | Kevin Kline | Nominated | |
| Online Film & Television Association Awards | Best Comedy/Musical Actress | Joan Cusack | Nominated | |
| Online Film & Television Association Awards | Best Supporting Actress | Joan Cusack | Nominated | |
| Satellite Awards | Best Motion Picture – Musical or Comedy | | Nominated | |
| Satellite Awards | Best Actor in a Motion Picture – Musical or Comedy | Kevin Kline | Nominated | |
| Satellite Awards | Best Supporting Actress in a Motion Picture – Musical or Comedy | Joan Cusack | Won | |
| Society of Texas Film Critics Awards | Best Supporting Actress | Joan Cusack | Won | |

American Film Institute recognition:

- AFI's 100 Years... 100 Laughs – Nominated

== Home media and rights ==
In & Out was released on a domestic Region 1 DVD by Paramount Home Entertainment on October 21, 1998. The release does not include any extras besides the theatrical trailer. The British Region 2 DVD was released on April 9, 2001. In 1998, it also received LaserDisc releases in the US, Hong Kong and Japan.

At the time of the film's release, Paramount's parent company Viacom held a majority stake in the film's producer Spelling Films (part of Spelling Entertainment). They acquired this stake in Spelling Entertainment in 1994, through their purchase of Blockbuster, which itself had a 67% stake in Spelling Entertainment since 1993. Viacom would go on to buy out the remaining stake in Spelling Entertainment during March 1999, which further solidified Paramount's ownership of In & Out.

The film received a new 4K remaster and was released on Blu-ray on June 1, 2021, in the United States and is currently available on iTunes in 4K with Dolby Vision HDR.

== See also ==
- List of LGBT-related films
