= 1994 Academy Awards =

1994 Academy Awards may refer to:

- 66th Academy Awards, the 1994 ceremony honoring the best in film for 1993
- 67th Academy Awards, the 1995 ceremony honoring the best in film for 1994
