= John Jympson =

British film editor (1930–2003)

- Born: 16 September 1930; London, England
- Died: 3 June 2003 (aged 72); London, England
- Occupation: Film editor
- Years active: 1949–1999
- Spouse: Maureen Hemsworth (m. 1954)

John Arthur Jympson (16 September 1930 – 3 June 2003) was a British film editor. He edited films such as Zulu (1964), A Hard Day's Night (1964), Kaleidoscope (1966), Frenzy (1972) and A Fish Called Wanda (1988).

== Career ==
Jympson was born on 16 September 1930 in London. He attended Dulwich College and left aged 17 in 1947 intending to become a veterinary surgeon. His father, Jympson Harman, the film critic for The Evening News, secured him a position as a runner at Ealing Studios. He worked in the cutting-room, aiding Peter Tanner on the 1949 film Kind Hearts and Coronets, before participating in two years of National Service. He returned to Ealing and worked on the films The Cruel Sea (1953) and The Ladykillers (1955). Jympson became an assembly cutter on I Was Monty's Double in 1958.

His break came in 1959 while working under William Hornbeck on Suddenly, Last Summer where his work earned him the credit of assembly editor. The film's success and a recommendation from Max Benedict meant Jympson was hired to edit films himself for the first time, namely A French Mistress and Suspect in 1960, each for the Boulting brothers. Jympson met actor and producer Stanley Baker when editing the 1962 film A Prize of Arms; the two worked together on The Man Who Finally Died and 1964's Zulu, which Tony Sloman called Jympson's "career-high" saying the film was "magnificently edited". He followed this up with a further success, A Hard Day's Night, a film starring the Beatles, was released to critical acclaim. The film's editing style has been strongly praised and is considered highly influential.

James B. Harris picked Jympson to edit his directorial debut The Bedford Incident in 1965, the year he also edited Sands of the Kalahari. He edited Where Eagles Dare (1968) and aided the film's director Brian G. Hutton on set. Jympson edited Kelly's Heroes (1970), and the Peter Sellers' films The Bobo (1967) and The Optimists of Nine Elms (1973). Alfred Hitchcock selected Jympson to edit Frenzy in 1972; off set the two became good friends.

Jympson was hired to edit Star Wars (1977). Director George Lucas had wanted to use Richard Chew, but selected Jympson as a more affordable local option who would not require a work permit for the film's shoot in the UK and as he liked his work on A Hard Day's Night. Jympson began cutting the film together while Lucas was still filming in Tunisia; as Lucas noted, the editor was in an "impossible position" because Lucas had not explained any of the film's material to him. When Lucas watched Jympson's rough cut for the first time, he disliked what he saw, and after further work was unable to resolve his issues, opted to fire Jympson halfway through the film's production, feeling the editor did not "mesh" with what he wanted from the film. Lucas replaced him with Paul Hirsch, Chew and his wife Marcia Lucas. According to reports, Jympson's edit contained about 30-40% different footage from the film's final version.

Little Shop of Horrors (1986), A Fish Called Wanda (1988), Housesitter (1992), Splitting Heirs (1993), Circle of Friends (1995), Haunted (1995) and In and Out (1997) were some of Jympson's later editing projects. Sloman says A Fish Called Wanda was "probably the biggest success of his career." Jympson received a BAFTA nomination for his editing of the film. His final film was 1999's Mad Cows.

== Personal life ==
Jympson married Maureen Hemsworth, a costume department worker at Ealing, in 1954. He suffered a stroke before editing his final film, Mad Cows, and later had both of his legs amputated due to diabetes. He died on 3 June 2003.

== Filmography ==
=== Films ===
All as editor unless stated

Year	Title	Notes
1949	Kind Hearts and Coronets	Second assistant editor; uncredited
1955	The Ship That Died of Shame	Second assistant editor; uncredited
1955	Joe MacBeth	Assistant editor
1957	Town on Trial	Assembly cutter
1957	The Long Haul	Assembly cutter
1958	I Was Monty's Double	Assembly cutter
1959	Suddenly, Last Summer	Assembly cutter
1960	A French Mistress	
1960	Suspect	
1961	The Treasure of Monte Cristo	
1962	Stork Talk	
1962	A Prize of Arms	
1963	It's All Happening	
1963	The Man Who Finally Died	
1964	Zulu	
1964	A Hard Day's Night	
1965	Dingaka	
1965	The Bedford Incident	
1965	Sands of the Kalahari	
1966	Kaleidoscope	
1967	Maroc 7	
1967	The Bobo	
1968	Deadfall	
1968	Where Eagles Dare	
1970	The Walking Stick	
1970	Kelly's Heroes	
1971	Flight of the Doves	
1972	Frenzy	
1973	Night Watch	
1973	The Optimists	
1974	The Dove	
1975	The Old Curiosity Shop	
1976	Ace Up My Sleeve	
1976	The Incredible Sarah	
1977	A Little Night Music	
1979	Meetings with Remarkable Men	
1981	Shark Boy of Bora Bora	Supervisor editor
1981	Riding High	
1981	Green Ice	
1983	High Road to China	
1985	Bad Medicine	
1986	Little Shop of Horrors	
1988	Honor Bound	
1988	A Fish Called Wanda	
1989	The Mighty Quinn	
1991	King Ralph	Uncredited
1992	Housesitter	
1993	Splitting Heirs	
1995	Circle of Friends	
1995	Haunted	
1997	In & Out	
1999	Mad Cows	

=== Television ===
Year	Title	Notes
1980	The Martian Chronicles	Supervisor editor; mini-series
1984	The Far Pavilions	Mini-series
1985	Gulag	TV film
1990	Women and Men: Stories of Seduction	TV film
