= Edward Jones (visual effects artist) =

American producer and visual effects artist

- Occupations: Producer, visual effects artist

Edward Jones is an American producer and visual effects artist. He won an Academy Award in the category Best Visual Effects for the film Who Framed Roger Rabbit.

== Selected filmography ==
- Who Framed Roger Rabbit (1988; co-won with Ken Ralston, Richard Williams and George Gibbs)
