= Cyrano de Bergerac (2008 film) =

- Based on: Cyrano de Bergerac; 1897 play by Edmond Rostand
- Directed by: David Leveaux
- Starring: Kevin Kline; Jennifer Garner; Daniel Sunjata
- Theme music composer: Alexander Sovronsky
- Country of origin: United States
- Original language: English

Production
- Producer: Ellen M. Krass
- Editor: Gary Bradley

Original release
- Network: PBS
- Release: January 7, 2008

Cyrano de Bergerac is a 2008 made-for-television adaptation of the 1897 play by Edmond Rostand, starring Kevin Kline as Cyrano, Jennifer Garner as his cousin Roxanne, and Daniel Sunjata as Christian. The production captures the 2007 Broadway revival, recorded before a live audience. The film was first broadcast on PBS' Great Performances on January 7, 2009.

== Cast ==
- Kevin Kline as Cyrano de Bergerac
- Jennifer Garner as Roxanne
- Chris Sarandon as De Guiche
- Daniel Sunjata as Christian

== Filming locations ==
The play was videotaped at the Richard Rodgers Theatre, in New York City.
