= The Acting Company =

American theater company founded 1972

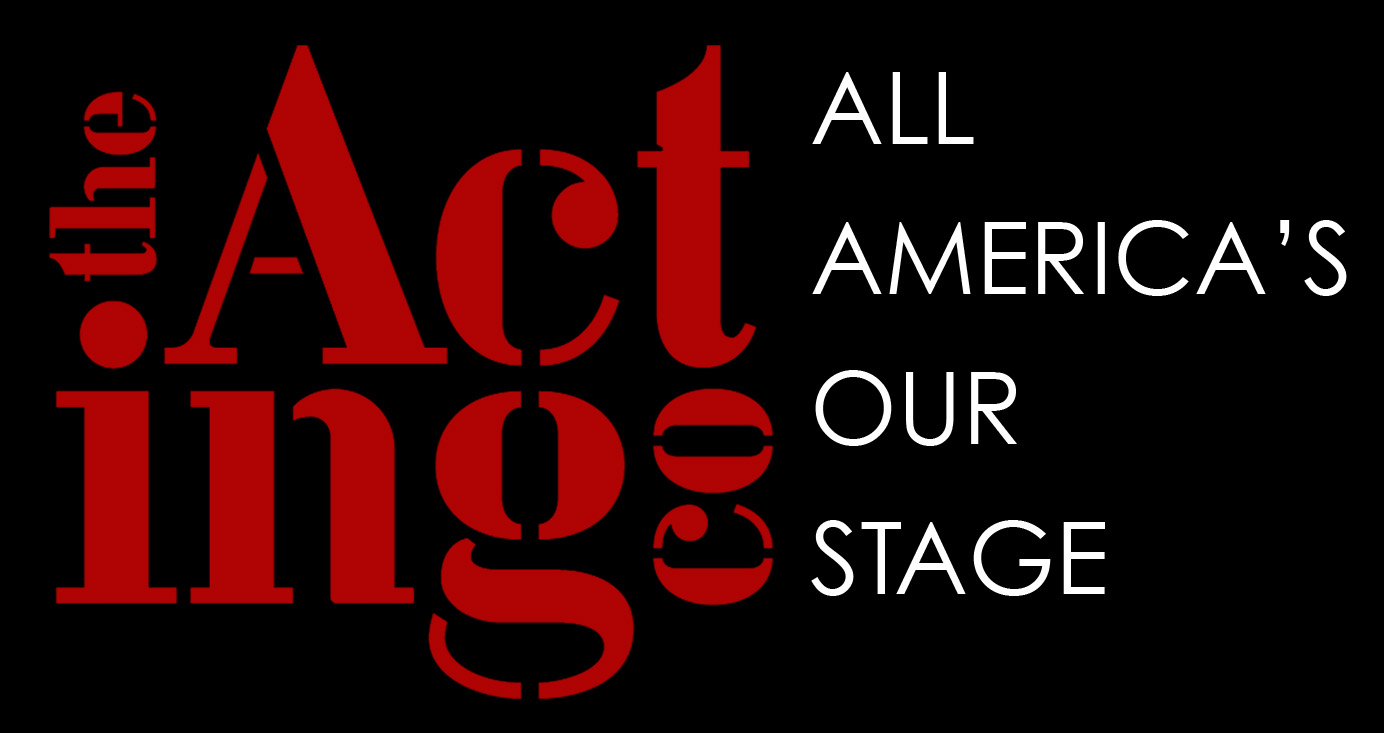
- Founded: 1972
- Founder: John Houseman; Margot Harley
- Type: Nonprofit (501(c)(3))
- Tax ID no.: 13-2759292
- Location: New York City
- Services: Touring repertory theater Educational programs
- Artistic director: Kent Gash
- Website: theactingcompany.org
- Formerly called: Group I Acting Company

The Acting Company is a professional theater company that tours the United States annually, staging and performing one or two plays in as many as fifty cities, often with runs of only one or two nights. Drama critic Mel Gussow has called it "the major touring classical theater of the United States." Based in New York City, The Acting Company also sponsors several educational programs for middle school and high school students.

The Acting Company was founded in 1972 by John Houseman and Margot Harley. Houseman, a distinguished actor and theater producer, was then the head of the new Drama Division of the Juilliard School. Loath to see the first group of actors disbanded upon graduation from Juilliard, Houseman and his Juilliard colleague Harley founded the "Group I Acting Company" as a non-profit corporation in New York City to provide employment and make use of their talents. The name was changed to "The Acting Company" after a few years as the original group I actors were replaced by graduates from many acting conservatories. From its beginnings, the Company toured extensively. As Margot Harley explained in a 2004 interview, "We knew perfectly well that in order to keep them together we had to tour, because nobody would come and see, over a long period of time, a young company in New York. And touring is historically a great training ground for an actor."

Houseman served as the producing artistic director through 1986; Harley was the Company's producer from its founding until her retirement at the end of 2015. The Company has been affiliated with New York City Center. Starting in 1980, it toured in association with the John F. Kennedy Center for the Performing Arts in Washington, D.C. Since 2009, the touring theater productions have been in association with the Guthrie Theater of Minneapolis. Over its history, The Acting Company has produced over 130 plays that have been seen by over 3 million people in 48 states and ten foreign countries. Its educational programs primarily serve students in disadvantaged communities.

The Acting Company won Tony Honors for Excellence in Theatre in 2003. Its touring company was the subject of a documentary film, Still on the Road (2013), that was directed by Sara Wolkowitz; the film has been widely televised. The Company and its productions have also been honored with a 1975 Los Angeles Drama Critics Circle Award, the Obie Award, Citibank's Excellence in Education Award, and two AUDELCO Awards.

Over its 40-year history, hundreds of actors beginning their professional careers have been employed in The Acting Company's productions. The Company's alumni include Michael Abbott Jr., Dennis Boutsikaris, Frances Conroy, Kevin Conroy, Keith David, Megan Gallagher, Harriet Harris, Benjamin Hendrickson, Jack Kenny, Kevin Kline, Patti LuPone, Jesse L. Martin, Dakin Matthews, Heather Raffo, David Schramm, Jack Stehlin, David Ogden Stiers, Jeffrey Wright, and Rainn Wilson.
