= A Fish Called Wanda =

1988 film by Charles Crichton

- US theatrical release poster
- Directed by: Charles Crichton
- Screenplay by: John Cleese
- Story by: John Cleese; Charles Crichton
- Produced by: Michael Shamberg
- Starring: John Cleese; Jamie Lee Curtis; Kevin Kline; Michael Palin
- Cinematography: Alan Hume
- Edited by: John Jympson
- Music by: John Du Prez
- Production companies: Metro-Goldwyn-Mayer; Prominent Features
- Distributed by: MGM/UA Communications Co. (United States); United International Pictures (international)
- Release dates: July 7, 1988 (New York City); July 15, 1988 (United States); October 14, 1988 (United Kingdom)
- Running time: 108 minutes
- Countries: United Kingdom; United States
- Language: English
- Budget: $7.5 million
- Box office: $188.6 million

A Fish Called Wanda is a 1988 heist comedy film directed by Charles Crichton and written by John Cleese from a story conceived by Cleese and Crichton. It stars Cleese, Jamie Lee Curtis, Kevin Kline, and Michael Palin. The film follows a gang of diamond thieves who double-cross one another to recover stolen diamonds hidden by their jailed leader. His barrister becomes a central figure – and jealousies rage – as femme fatale Wanda seduces him to locate the loot.

A Fish Called Wanda grossed over $188 million worldwide, becoming the seventh-highest-grossing film of 1988. At the 61st Academy Awards, it was nominated for Best Director and Best Original Screenplay and won for Best Supporting Actor for Kline. A spiritual sequel, Fierce Creatures, was released in 1997. The British Film Institute ranked A Fish Called Wanda the 39th-greatest British film of the 20th century.

== Plot ==
London gangster George Thomason and his right-hand man, Ken Pile, an animal lover with a stutter, plan a jewel heist. They bring in two Americans: con artist Wanda Gershwitz and weapons expert Otto West, a mean-spirited Anglophobe. Wanda and Otto are lovers, but they hide this from George and Ken, pretending to be siblings, so Wanda can work her charms on them.

The heist is successful, and the gang escapes with a large sum in diamonds that they hide in a safe in an old workshop. Soon after, Wanda and Otto betray George to the police, and he is arrested. They return to collect the diamonds, with Wanda planning to double-cross Otto as well, but find that George has moved them. In Ken's fish tank, Wanda discovers a key to the safe deposit box containing the diamonds, but there are no hints about the location of the box. Wanda hides it in her pendant.

Wanda decides to seduce George's barrister, Archie Leach, so he can persuade George to plead guilty and give up the location of the diamonds. Archie is in a loveless marriage and falls for Wanda; Otto is jealous, and his interference causes Wanda and Archie's liaisons to go disastrously wrong. Wanda accidentally leaves her pendant at Archie's house, and Archie's wife, Wendy, mistakes it as a gift for her. At Wanda's insistence, Archie recovers the pendant by staging a burglary. Eventually, Archie, feeling guilty, ends the affair.

George asks Ken to kill Mrs Coady, the Crown's only eyewitness. To his dismay, Ken accidentally kills her three dogs by means of a series of staged accidents, but ultimately succeeds in his aim when she dies of a heart attack. Wanda and Otto want George to remain in jail, but with no witness, he seems set to get off. At his trial, defence witness Wanda unexpectedly gives evidence against him. When Archie, stunned, flubs his cross-examination and calls her "darling", Wendy realises that Archie has had an affair and decides to divorce him. Otto tries to force Ken to reveal the location of the diamonds by eating his pet fish, leaving Ken's favourite, named Wanda, until last. Ken reveals that the diamonds are at a hotel near Heathrow Airport.

With his career and marriage over, Archie resolves to cut his losses, steal the loot, and flee to South America. Promised less jail time, George tells Archie that Ken knows where the diamonds are. Archie sees Wanda fleeing the courthouse, pulls her into his car, and races to Ken's flat. As Archie runs into the building, Otto steals his car, taking Wanda with him. Ken and Archie give chase. Otto and Wanda recover the diamonds, but Wanda double-crosses him and leaves him unconscious in a broom cupboard. Recovering, Otto shoots his way out of the cupboard and is confronted by Archie. Otto is about to kill him, but Archie stalls him by taunting Otto about American failures such as the Vietnam War. Ken arrives driving a steamroller, seeking vengeance for the fish; Otto, who has stepped in wet concrete and cannot move, is run over but survives. Archie and Wanda board the plane, and Otto, clinging to the window outside, curses them until he is blown off during takeoff.

== Cast ==
- John Cleese as Archie Leach
- Jamie Lee Curtis as Wanda Gershwitz
- Kevin Kline as Otto West
- Michael Palin as Ken Pile
- Maria Aitken as Wendy Leach
- Tom Georgeson as George Thomason
- Patricia Hayes as Mrs Eileen Coady
- Geoffrey Palmer as Judge
- Cynthia Cleese (as Cynthia Caylor) as Portia Leach
- Ken Campbell as Bartlett
- Al Ashton as Warder
- Roger Brierley as Davidson
- Llewellyn Rees as Sir John
- Michael Percival as Percival
- Jeremy Child as Mr. Johnson
- Stephen Fry as Hutchison (Cameo)

== Production ==
Cleese and Crichton had attempted to make a film together in 1969. Although the project never entered development, they promised each other that they would collaborate again. In June 1983, the two began writing the script for Wanda, and, for the next two and half years, they met three times a month to work on the script. According to Crichton, "We had a week of rehearsals and then a gap of two weeks in which to incorporate any new ideas which had been thrown up and to polish the script." According to Michael Palin, the original title was "A Goldfish Called Wanda".

Cleese told an interviewer that he called his character Archie Leach, actor Cary Grant's real name, because "I feel this film is as near as I'll ever get to being Cary Grant." Cleese, admitting in press interviews that he had no knowledge of how to direct a film, served as co-director, since the studio executives at MGM were worried about Crichton's age—he was 78 at the time. On the set, Crichton wore a T-shirt presented to him by Cleese and inscribed "Age and treachery will always overcome youth and skill". Cleese cast his real life daughter Cynthia as his screen daughter Portia in the film. Filming began in England on July 13, 1987, and wrapped on September 21, 1987 after 70 days.

== Reception ==
=== Box office ===
The film premiered in New York City on July 7, 1988, and in Los Angeles on July 13, 1988, and was released theatrically on July 15, 1988, by Metro-Goldwyn-Mayer. Six weeks later, it reached number one at the box office there. It eventually grossed $62.5 million in the United States and Canada, becoming the highest-grossing British film of all time with a gross of £12 million. Outside of the US (including the UK), it grossed $126.1 million, for a worldwide total of $188.6 million. It was number one in Germany for seven weeks. It was the number one rental video in the US in 1989.

=== Recognition ===
Kline won the Academy Award for Best Supporting Actor and a nomination for the BAFTA Award for Best Actor in a Leading Role for his performance. Cleese and Crichton received a nomination for the Academy Award for Best Original Screenplay. Crichton was also nominated for the Academy Award for Best Director, Cleese won the BAFTA Award for Best Actor in a Leading Role and Curtis received nominations for the BAFTA Award for Best Actress in a Leading Role and the Golden Globe Award for Best Actress – Motion Picture Comedy or Musical. Michael Palin won the BAFTA Award for Best Actor in a Supporting Role, while Maria Aitken received a nomination for the BAFTA Award for Best Actress in a Supporting Role.

=== Rankings ===
In 2016, Empire ranked A Fish Called Wanda 35th on their list of the 100 best British films, with their entry calling it "a must-own for any British comedy fan ... It made possible Richard Curtis's later Brit-com oeuvre by establishing that British eccentricism can sell, revived the world's interest in Ealing comedies, and allowed a character with Cary Grant's real name – Cleese's bumbling lawyer Archie Leach – to live again on the big screen." The film is number 27 on Bravo's "100 Funniest Movies". It is also included in the Reader's Digest "100 Funniest Films" list.

In 1999, it was voted 39th on the BFI Top 100 British films list compiled by the British Film Institute. Also in 2000, the American Film Institute placed the film on its 100 Years...100 Laughs list, where it was ranked number 21. Then in 2003, AFI nominated Otto West as a villain from this film for AFI's 100 Years...100 Heroes & Villains. James Berardinelli of ReelViews awarded the film four out of four stars in his review; it is also number 10 on his "Top 100" list.

=== Critical response ===
On Rotten Tomatoes, the film holds a 96% approval rating, based on 67 reviews, with an average rating of 8.1/10. The site's critical consensus reads, "Smartly written, smoothly directed, and solidly cast, A Fish Called Wanda offers a classic example of a brainy comedy with widespread appeal." On Metacritic, the film holds a score of 80 out of 100, based on 17 critics, indicating "generally favorable" reviews. According to CriticsTop10, "A Fish Called Wanda" appeared on over 60 critics' top ten lists, making it the fifth most acclaimed film of 1988. Audiences polled by CinemaScore gave the film an average grade of "A" on an A+ to F scale as of July 2020.

=== Portrayal of stuttering ===
In March 1989, a few months after the release of the film, the Orange County chapter of the National Stuttering Project (the predecessor of the National Stuttering Association) picketed outside MGM offices in Culver City in protest of the movie.

=== Accolades ===
Award	Category	Nominee(s)	Result
Academy Awards	Best Director	Charles Crichton	Nominated
Academy Awards	Best Supporting Actor	Kevin Kline	Won
Academy Awards	Best Screenplay – Written Directly for the Screen	John Cleese and Charles Crichton	Nominated
American Comedy Awards	Funniest Actor in a Motion Picture (Leading Role)	John Cleese	Nominated
American Comedy Awards	Funniest Actor in a Motion Picture (Leading Role)	Kevin Kline	Nominated
American Comedy Awards	Funniest Actress in a Motion Picture (Leading Role)	Jamie Lee Curtis	Nominated
ASCAP Film and Television Music Awards	Top Box Office Films	John Du Prez	Won
British Academy Film Awards	Best Film	Michael Shamberg and Charles Crichton	Nominated
British Academy Film Awards	Best Direction	Charles Crichton	Nominated
British Academy Film Awards	Best Actor in a Leading Role	John Cleese	Won
British Academy Film Awards	Best Actor in a Leading Role	Kevin Kline	Nominated
British Academy Film Awards	Best Actress in a Leading Role	Jamie Lee Curtis	Nominated
British Academy Film Awards	Best Actor in a Supporting Role	Michael Palin	Won
British Academy Film Awards	Best Actress in a Supporting Role	Maria Aitken	Nominated
British Academy Film Awards	Best Original Screenplay	John Cleese	Nominated
British Academy Film Awards	Best Editing	John Jympson	Nominated
David di Donatello Awards	Best Foreign Screenplay	John Cleese	Won
Directors Guild of America Awards	Outstanding Directorial Achievement in Motion Pictures	Charles Crichton	Nominated
Edgar Allan Poe Awards	Best Motion Picture Screenplay	John Cleese	Nominated
Evening Standard British Film Awards	Best Film	Charles Crichton	Won
Evening Standard British Film Awards	Peter Sellers Award for Comedy	Charles Crichton	Won
Golden Globe Awards	Best Motion Picture – Musical or Comedy		Nominated
Golden Globe Awards	Best Actor in a Motion Picture – Musical or Comedy	John Cleese	Nominated
Golden Globe Awards	Best Actress in a Motion Picture – Musical or Comedy	Jamie Lee Curtis	Nominated
Goldene Kamera	Golden Screen		Won
Nastro d'Argento	European Silver Ribbon	John Cleese	Won
Writers Guild of America Awards	Best Screenplay – Written Directly for the Screen	John Cleese and Charles Crichton	Nominated

=== Laughing death ===
During the initial run of the film, a Danish audiologist named Ole Bentzen died while laughing during a screening, which led newspapers to report that he had died from laughter. The official cause of death was heart fibrillation, which may have been caused by an increased heart rate due to extended laughter. Cleese considered using the event for publicity, but ultimately decided that doing so would be in bad taste.

== Sequels and adaptations ==
The principal cast reunited in 1997 for Fierce Creatures (dubbed an "equal" rather than a sequel or prequel, by Kline), playing different roles. Fierce Creatures was not as well received by critics or audiences as A Fish Called Wanda. The novelization of Fierce Creatures, written by Iain Johnstone, who co-wrote the film, begins with a letter from Archie (John Cleese's character in the first film) to his brother Rollo. According to the letter:

- Archie and Wanda are still living happily in Rio, and Wanda enjoys having a new child (or multiple children) each year;
- Otto visited them once, having left South Africa after Nelson Mandela's election and the end of the apartheid regime; he is looking for like-minded individuals to form a similar group of National Socialists, and Archie and Wanda are both heartily glad when he is gone;
- Ken is still master of ceremonies at the London Sea World; before visiting Rio, Otto "looked him up" as if they were old friends, apparently showed up with a bag of tropical fish as a peace offering but did not even get close before Ken had security guards throw Otto out of the park. Otto as an act of final revenge empties the bag of fish into his mouth and swallows with no remorse.

In 2008, it was reported that Cleese and his daughter, Cynthia (who played his screen daughter, Portia), had started to work on a stage musical version of the film.

=== Indian adaptations ===
- Malayalam film Kakkakuyil (2002) was inspired by this film with many changes.
  - Telugu film Tappu Chesi Pappu Koodu (2002) was a remake of Kakkakuyil.
  - Tamil film London (2005) was also a remake of Kakkakuyil.
- Hindi film Padmashree Laloo Prasad Yadav (2005), was a loose adaptation of this film.

== See also ==
- BFI Top 100 British films
- Michael Palin Centre for Stammering
