= Soapdish =

1991 film by Michael Hoffman

- Theatrical release poster
- Directed by: Michael Hoffman
- Screenplay by: Robert Harling; Andrew Bergman
- Story by: Robert Harling
- Produced by: Aaron Spelling; Alan Greisman
- Starring: Sally Field; Kevin Kline; Robert Downey Jr.; Cathy Moriarty; Whoopi Goldberg; Elisabeth Shue
- Cinematography: Ueli Steiger
- Edited by: Garth Craven
- Music by: Alan Silvestri
- Distributed by: Paramount Pictures
- Release date: May 31, 1991
- Running time: 97 minutes
- Country: United States
- Language: English
- Budget: $25 million
- Box office: $36.5 million

Soapdish is a 1991 American comedy film directed by Michael Hoffman, from a screenplay by Robert Harling and Andrew Bergman. The film was produced by Aaron Spelling and Alan Greisman, and executive produced by Herbert Ross.

The film tells a backstage story of the cast and crew of a popular fictional television soap opera. It stars Sally Field as a mature soap star, joined by Kevin Kline, Robert Downey Jr., Elisabeth Shue, Whoopi Goldberg, Cathy Moriarty, Teri Hatcher, Garry Marshall, Kathy Najimy, and Carrie Fisher, as well as cameo appearances by TV personalities like Leeza Gibbons, John Tesh (both playing themselves as Entertainment Tonight hosts/reporters), and real-life soap opera actors Stephen Nichols and Finola Hughes.

The film received generally positive reviews. Kline was nominated for a Golden Globe Award for Best Actor – Motion Picture Musical or Comedy.

== Plot ==
Celeste Talbert is the long-time star of the daytime soap opera The Sun Also Sets. Her ambitious co-star Montana Moorehead plots to replace Celeste as the star by promising sexual favors to producer David Seton Barnes. To make the audience hate Celeste's character, Montana and David arrange a storyline where she accidentally kills a young, homeless deaf-mute, played by the newly cast Lori Craven. Despite objections from head writer Rose Schwartz and Celeste, the scene plays out, but is interrupted by Celeste's recognition of Lori as her real-life niece. Network honcho Edmund Edwards makes Lori a regular cast member, hoping to use the relationship to boost the show's declining ratings.

Montana and David bring back Jeffrey Anderson, an actor whose firing Celeste arranged decades before after their romantic relationship soured. Bitter at being exiled to Florida dinner theater, Jeffrey relishes the chance to needle Celeste. Outwardly despising Jeffrey but still harboring feelings for him, Celeste interrupts when Jeffrey and Lori move in for a scripted online kiss and reveals Lori is actually her daughter by Jeffrey. On camera, Celeste explains that she was responsible for getting Jeffrey fired because of being distraught about the pregnancy. She had her parents raise Lori as her niece, due to pressure from the network.

The scandal turns everyone on the production against Celeste, but ignites their ratings. At a board meeting David insists Celeste be fired, while Rose defends her. The board rules for Celeste, citing the positive press the show has received, and the public sympathy for Celeste.

Celeste convinces Jeffrey to speak to Lori after an unpleasant conversation between the two women, and goes so well that Celeste and Jeffrey embrace. Montana interrupts as they're about to kiss, and claims she slept with Jeffrey the previous night. Rose heightens the tension by showing Celeste a tabloid article claiming Montana is pregnant with Jeffrey's child. Celeste, Jeffrey, and Lori argue and threaten the head of the network about quitting the show.

The network decides to shoot a live episode, where the actors will learn their characters' fate while reading their lines from a teleprompter. Lori's character has "brain fever" and will die; still hoping to be rid of Celeste, Montana improvises and suggests that a brain transplant can save her. Lori is shocked by the revelation, but in character, Celeste plays along, offering her own brain for the operation. Touched by the sacrifice, Lori asks Celeste and Jeffrey not to leave the show, and softens to her newfound parents. Montana, desperate to stop them, reiterates she is pregnant with Jeffrey's child, but she is publicly ruined by Rose who, with the help of vengeful Ariel Maloney, who wanted Jeffrey for herself, exposes Montana as transgender, formerly known as "Milton Moorehead", using a high school yearbook as proof. David is shocked and Montana flees the set, screaming in horror.

Celeste, Jeffrey, and Lori win soap opera awards while Montana is relegated to detransitioning and performing at Jeffrey's former Florida dinner theater.

== Cast ==
- Sally Field as Celeste Talbert / "Maggie"
- Kevin Kline as Jeffrey Anderson / "Dr. Rod Randall"
- Robert Downey Jr. as David Seton Barnes
- Cathy Moriarty as Montana Moorehead / Milton Moorehead / "Nurse Nan"
- Elisabeth Shue as Lori Craven / "Angelique"
- Whoopi Goldberg as Rose Schwartz
- Teri Hatcher as Ariel Maloney / "Dr. Monica Demonico"
- Garry Marshall as Edmund Edwards
- Kathy Najimy as Tawny Miller
- Arne Nannestad as Burton White
- Paul Johansson as Blair Brennan / "Bolt"
- Sheila Kelley as Fran
- Leeza Gibbons as herself
- John Tesh as himself
- Stephen Nichols as himself
- Carrie Fisher as Betsy Faye Sharon
- Benjamin Stein as a nitwit executive

== Production ==
During production of Steel Magnolias, with writer Robert Harling on set, he had conversations with Sally Field and her then husband Alan Greisman about making a film about actors, to which Harling thought a movie where she played an "out-and-out bitch" would be fun, which she found interesting. It was originally slated for production at TriStar Pictures with Herbert Ross slated to direct before it eventually shifted to Paramount Pictures with Michael Hoffman as the director.

Andrew Bergman was called in to re-write the script. "I thought it was a fun picture and a wonderful cast. I wasn't on the set all that much, but whenever I was, it seemed perfectly agreeable." Sigourney Weaver turned down the role of Celeste; she would later regret the decision. For inspiration, Michael Hoffman instructed Sally Field to watch Pedro Almodóvar's 1988 film Women on the Verge of a Nervous Breakdown, as well as The Women (1939) and Pillow Talk (1959).

== Reception ==
On Rotten Tomatoes the film has an approval rating of 74% based on reviews from 42 critics, with an average rating of 6/10. The site's critical consensus states, "Soapdish may not be as addictive as the serialized dramas it's spoofing, but a talented cast helps make this affectionate sendup feel fresh." On Metacritic the film has a score of 65 out of 100 based on 19 reviews, indicating "generally favorable reviews". Audiences surveyed by CinemaScore gave the film a grade "A−" on scale of A to F.

Rita Kempley, writing for The Washington Post, called it "pure joy, a lemon-fresh spoof of daytime drama that does the dishing and may even soften your hands. An uproarious look behind the scenes of a fictional soap opera, it soaks the conventions of the genre with unfailing zest to leave a shine so bright you can see your face in it - art mirroring life and all that." Roger Ebert gave the film three-and-a-half stars and called it "the kind of movie that is a balancing act, really." Entertainment Weekly critic Owen Gleiberman gave it a letter grade of C− and said that it "makes the tackiness of soap operas seem far more desperate than funny."

In 2016, Meredith Talusan of BuzzFeed cited it as an example of transphobia, placing Soapdish in a long line of films depicting "the transgender-woman-as-villainess trope in American movie comedies."

== Stage adaptation ==
A stage musical adaptation of Soapdish was workshopped in 2010 and had a staged reading featuring Kristin Chenoweth, John Stamos, and Jane Krakowski in 2012, with a book by Harling, music by George Stiles and lyrics by Anthony Drewe. There were reports in 2016 that Chenoweth was getting ready to star in the work in London the following year. In 2020 the musical made its first public appearance in London at the Turbine Theatre as a workshop production.

== Television adaptation ==
On January 10, 2022, it was announced that a Soapdish television series was in development at Paramount+, with Goldberg reprising her role as Rose Schwartz, and Jennie Snyder Urman serving as co-writer.
