= Rik Simpson =

British record producer

- Also known as: Rikademus, Rick Simpson
- Occupations: Record producer, engineer, songwriter, audio mixer
- Instruments: Drum programming, keyboard, guitar, bass guitar vocals
- Years active: 1989–present
- Website: www.riksimpson.com

Rik Simpson (also known as Rikademus) is a British record producer, songwriter and musician. He has worked with Coldplay, Jay-Z, Portishead, Kasabian, Black Rebel Motorcycle Club and PJ Harvey. He collaborated with Guy Berryman to produce for the Pierces as well, under the name the Darktones. In addition to the technical aspect of recording and mixing, Simpson often contributes musically in his productions, singing and playing with different instruments.

== Production credits ==
Credits adapted from Discogs.

- Roseland NYC Live (1998) by Portishead – mixer
- Is This Desire? (1998) by PJ Harvey – mixer
- Between Darkness and Wonder (2003) by Lamb – engineer
- Take Them On, On Your Own (2003) by Black Rebel Motorcycle Club (2003) – engineer
- Before the Poison (2004) by Marianne Faithfull – engineer, mixer
- "See It in a Boy's Eyes" (2004) by Jamelia – writer
- Kasabian (2004) by Kasabian – engineer, producer
- Tourist (2005) by Athlete – engineer
- "Gone Up in Flames" by Morning Runner – producer
- Silence Will Kill You (2007) by Some Velvet Morning – engineer, mixer, producer
- "Beach Chair" (2006) by Jay-Z and Chris Martin – engineer, producer
- Viva la Vida or Death and All His Friends (2008) by Coldplay – engineer, mixer, producer
- Come to Life (2009) by Natalie Imbruglia – producer
- Love You More (2010) by the Pierces – producer
- You & I (2011) by the Pierces – producer
- Mylo Xyloto (2011) by Coldplay – engineer, mixer, producer, musician
- Immunity (2013) by Jon Hopkins – mixer
- Ghost Stories (2014) by Coldplay – engineer, mixer, producer, musician
- A Head Full of Dreams (2015) by Coldplay – engineer, mixer, producer, musician
- Fatti Sentire (2018) by Laura Pausini – engineer, mixer, producer, musician
- Singularity (2018) by Jon Hopkins – mixer, musician
- "Avalanche" (2018) by Another Sky – mixer, musician, producer
- "The Cracks" (2019) by Another Sky – musician, producer
- "Life Was Coming in Through the Blinds" (2019) by Another Sky – musician, producer
- Everyday Life (2019) by Coldplay – engineer, mixer, producer, musician
- Forever (2020) by Folk Devils – mixer
- Rough Seas (2021) by Some Velvet Morning – mixer, producer
- "Sofia" (2021) by Askjell, Iris and Aurora – mixer
- Music of the Spheres (2021) by Coldplay – engineer, mixer, producer, musician
- Lady M: A New British Musical (2022) by Rik Simpson – engineer, mixer, musician, producer

== Awards and nominations ==
=== Grammy Awards ===
Year	Nominee / work	Award	Result
2009	Viva la Vida or Death and All His Friends	Best Rock Album	Won
2009	Viva la Vida or Death and All His Friends	Album of the Year	Nominated
2013	Mylo Xyloto	Best Rock Album	Nominated
2021	Everyday Life	Album of the Year	Nominated
