= Drag You Down =

Drag You Down may refer to:

- "Drag You Down", a song by Finger Eleven from The Greyest of Blue Skies (2000)
- "Drag You Down", a song by Ivy, the B-side of the single "Get Enough" (1994)
- "Drag You Down", a song by Orphanage from Inside (2000)
- "Drag You Down", a song by The Pierces from You & I (2011)
- "Drag You Down", a song by Rattlesnake Remedy (2006)
- "Drag You Down", a fictitious entry song created by the music writer Joel Whitburn as a copyright trap
