= Glorious (The Pierces song) =

Single by The Pierces

from the album You & I
- Released: 10 April 2011
- Genre: Pop
- Length: 3:44
- Label: Polydor Records
- Songwriter(s): James Levy

The Pierces singles chronology
"You'll Be Mine" (2011)	"Glorious" (2011)	"It Will Not Be Forgotten"" (2011)

"Glorious" is a single by Los Angeles-based band The Pierces. It is the second single released from their fourth studio album, You & I. It was released on 10 April 2011 as a Digital download. The song is a cover originally sung by US indie-pop/rock musician James Levy, who is also credited for playing guitar on The Pierces' version.

== Music video ==
The music video was uploaded to YouTube on April 21, 2011.

== Track listings ==
Digital download #1

1. "Glorious" - 3:44

Digital download #2

1. "Glorious" - 3:44
2. "City On Fire" - 3:15

== Chart performance ==
Chart (2011)	Peak position
UK Singles (The Official Charts Company)	176

== Release history ==
Country	Date	Format	Label
United Kingdom	10 April 2011	Digital download	Polydor Records
United Kingdom	22 May 2011	Digital download	Polydor Records
