= You'll Be Mine =

You'll Be Mine may refer to:

- "You'll Be Mine" (The Beatles song)
- "You'll Be Mine (Party Time)", a song by Gloria Estefan
- "You'll Be Mine", a song by Howlin' Wolf from Howlin' Wolf
- "You'll Be Mine" (The Pierces song)
- "You'll Be Mine" (Havana Brown song), a song by DJ Havana Brown from her debut EP When the Lights Go Out
- "You'll Be Mine", a 2018 song by Michael Learns to Rock from Still
