= Mr. Saturday Night (disambiguation) =

Mr. Saturday Night is a 1992 American comedy-drama film starring and directed by Billy Crystal.

Mr. Saturday Night may also refer to:

== Media ==
- Mr. Saturday Night (musical), based on the film
- Mr. Saturday Night (album), 2022 album by Jon Pardi
- Mr. Saturday Night, 2011 album by Julian Velard

== People ==
- Cole Caufield (born 2001), American ice hockey player nicknamed Mr. Saturday Night

== See also ==
- "Mr. Saturday Knight", 2001 episode of the animated TV series Family Guy
