= Love You More (EP) =

Love You More EP

EP by The Pierces
- Released: October 25, 2010
- Genre: Folk rock, pop
- Length: 12:53
- Label: Polydor
- Producer: The Darktones (Rik Simpson, Guy Berryman)

The Pierces chronology
Thirteen Tales of Love and Revenge (2007)	Love You More EP (2010)	You & I (2011)

Love You More is the first EP by The Pierces and their first release under Polydor Records. It was released digitally on October 17, 2010, and physically on October 25, 2010, in the UK, and digitally on January 11, 2011, in the US. The Tracks "Love You More" and "We Are Stars" appeared on The Pierces' fourth studio album You & I, which released the following year.

== Track listing ==
1. "Love You More" - 3:22
2. "We Are Stars" - 3:46
3. "To the Grave" - 2:53
4. "We Can Make It" - 2:46
