= Another Sky =

Another Sky may refer to:

- Another Sky (album), a 2000 album by Altan
- Another Sky (band), English post-rock band formed in 2017
