= You & I (The Pierces album) =

Studio album by The Pierces
- Released: 30 May 2011
- Genre: Folk rock
- Length: 39:40
- Label: Polydor
- Producer: The Darktones

The Pierces chronology
Thirteen Tales of Love and Revenge (2007)	You & I (2011)	Creation (2014)

Singles from You & I
- 1. "You'll Be Mine" Released: 6 March 2011; 2. "Glorious" Released: 10 April 2011; 3. "It Will Not Be Forgotten" Released: 8 August 2011; 4. "Kissing You Goodbye" Released: 23 October 2011; 5. "I Put Your Records On" Released: 2012

You & I, stylized You&I, is the fourth full-length album by The Pierces. The album was released on 30 May 2011 in the United Kingdom. The album was produced by the production duo The Darktones, consisting of Coldplay bassist Guy Berryman and Rik Simpson. On 5 June 2011, the album entered the UK Albums Chart at number four.

== Singles ==
- "You'll Be Mine" was the first single released from the album, it was released on 6 March 2011 and peaked at number 46 on the UK Singles Chart. It was written by Catherine Pierce.
- "Glorious" was the second single released from the album, it was released on 10 April 2011 and peaked at number 102 on the UK Singles Chart. It was originally written, recorded, and released by NY musician James Levy.
- "It Will Not Be Forgotten" was the third single released from the album, It was released on 8 August 2011. It was written by Allison Pierce.
- "Kissing You Goodbye" was the fourth single released from the album, it was released on 23 October 2011 and the music video on 28 November 2011. It was written by Allison and Catherine Pierce.
- A video for the last track on the record called "I Put Your Records On" (Written by Allison Pierce) was released on the 5th March 2012. It shows the group traipsing through a graveyard.

== Reception ==
Professional ratings
Aggregate scores
Source	Rating
AnyDecentMusic?	6.5/10
Metacritic	65/100
Review scores
Source	Rating
BBC	(positive)
The Telegraph	4/5 stars
The Guardian	4/5 stars
The Independent	2/5 stars
The Observer	3/5 stars
Slant Magazine	3.5/5 stars
Yahoo Music	6/10 stars

You & I has garnered generally positive reviews from music critics. The Guardian gave the album a favorable review, citing it as the "straight(est)" piece by the band, a calculated move, compared to their previous albums, which they praised for their "mischief". BBC continued with praise, harking, "Kissing You Goodbye, which is so Bangles-cover-California-Dreamin’ it’s potentially litigious, there is a Susanna Hoffs-ian tremulousness to their voices. Space & Time is the husky, dusky, David Lynch-dark one. Drag You Down is the sultry one that proves these aren’t pop puppets, they’re girls with attitude. And I Put Your Records On is the one designed to up their cred with the alt-country brigade. Throughout, there are unexpected melodic twists and turns, and the whole thing feels like a bid for commercial acceptance, if indeed the market for this classy music even exists anymore." The Observer was slightly more critical, mentioning that "Their tunes may now be doe-eyed and glossy, but they are still captivating. "It Will Not Be Forgotten" examines a lost love with a faraway look in its eyes, while "Love You More" is a goth-folk sweep that features Catherine's ex, Albert Hammond Jr, on the low-slung guitar hook. Both will sound especially good in a convertible speeding down a sun-baked highway, and deserve to ring in the ears of playlisters at Radio 2. Pristine and bittersweet, "I Put Your Records On" recalls Rumer." Slant Magazine states that, although the conventional air is a little off-putting at first, "the duo pulls off "conventional" just as well as they do twisted."

== Track listing ==
No.	Title	Writer(s)	Producer(s)	Length
1.	"You'll Be Mine"	Catherine Pierce		3:23
2.	"It Will Not Be Forgotten"	Allison Pierce		3:52
3.	"Love You More"	C. Pierce		3:23
4.	"We Are Stars"	C. Pierce		3:47
5.	"Glorious"	James Levy		3:39
6.	"The Good Samaritan"	A. Pierce		3:19
7.	"Kissing You Goodbye"	A. Pierce, C. Pierce		3:00
8.	"Close My Eyes"	A. Pierce, C. Pierce, Roger Greenawalt		4:01
9.	"Space & Time"	A. Pierce	Dreamlab	3:35
10.	"Drag You Down"	C. Pierce		4:14
11.	"I Put Your Records On"	A. Pierce		3:27

== Personnel ==
- Allison Pierce – lead & backing vocal; acoustic guitar (2,4,9-11); songwriting
- Catherine Pierce – lead & backing vocal; songwriting
- Rik Simpson – drum programming (1-10), keyboards (7), percussion (1,3,4); acoustic guitar & bv (3); electric guitar & bv (5); dulcimer, piano & pump organ (7); mix (5,8.10)
- Guy Berryman – keyboards (1-3,9,11); percussion (1-5,7-10); bass guitar (1-5,7-10); electric guitar (1-4,7,8); glockenspiel (1,2,4,7); omnichord (4)
- Matt McGinn – electric guitar (2,9,10); acoustic guitar (7)
- James Levy – acoustic guitar (1,5); electric guitar (5)
- Alex Levy – electric guitar (6,8); slide guitar (8)
- BJ Cole – slide guitar (3,4,9)
- Tom Marsh – drums (1,3,4,5,7,9,10)
- Matt Romano – drums (1,2,8)
- Russell Simins – drums (5,10)
- Glenn Moule – drums (7)
- Jon Hopkins – pump organ & keyboards (3); organ (4)
- Davide Rossi – strings (5,8,10)
- The Darktones (Rik Simpson & Guy Berryman) – production, recording

== Charts ==
Chart performance for You & I
Chart (2011)	Peak position
UK Albums (OCC)	4

== Certifications ==
Certifications for You & I
Region	Certification	Certified units/sales
United Kingdom (BPI)	Gold	100,000^{^}
^{^} Shipments figures based on certification alone.

== Release history ==
Country	Date	Format	Label
United Kingdom	30 May 2011	Digital download	Polydor Records
United Kingdom	30 May 2011	CD	Polydor Records
