= Roger Greenawalt =

Roger McEvoy Greenawalt
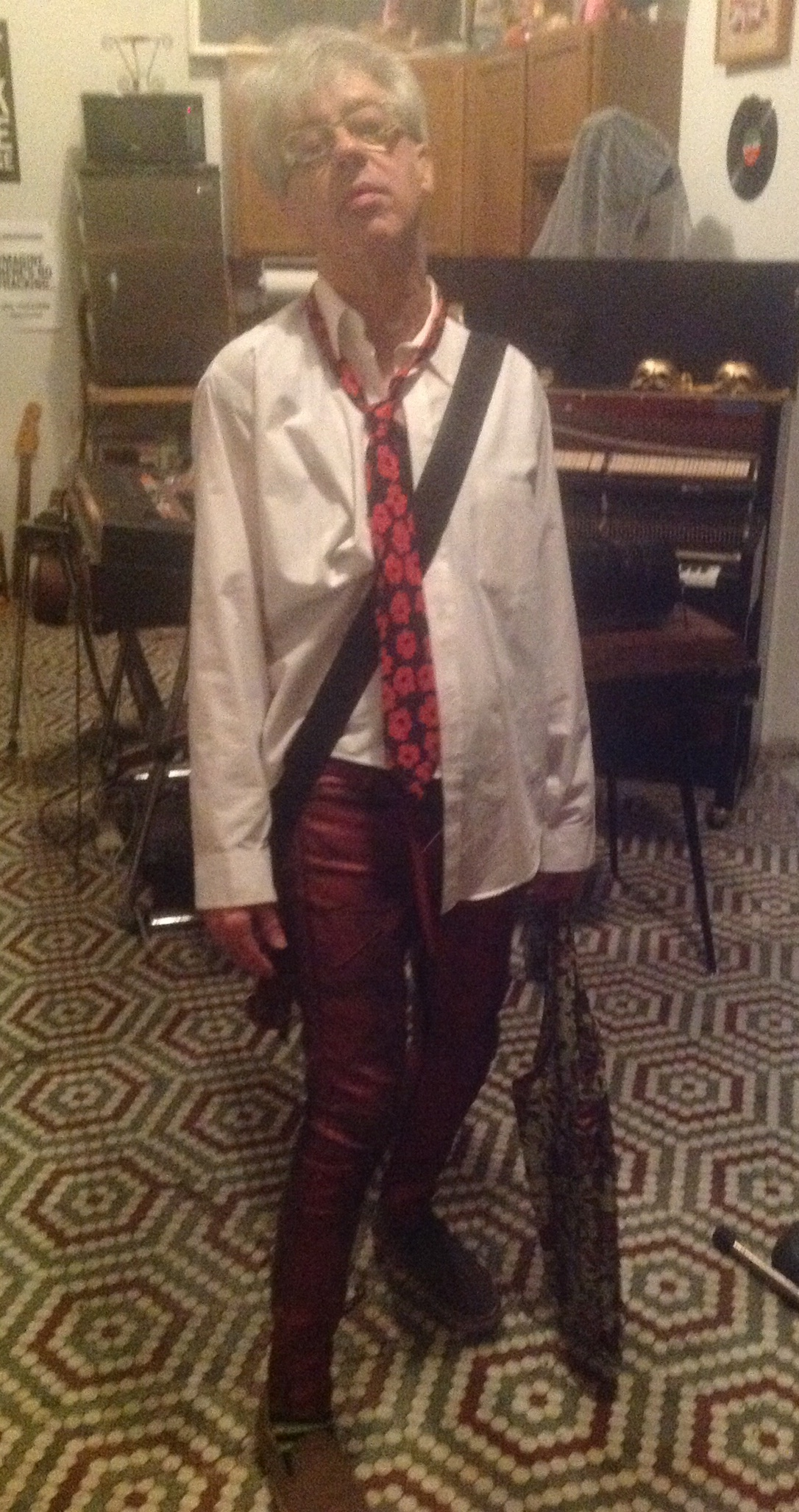

Background information
- Born: Berlin, Germany
- Genres: Rock, Pop, Acoustic Rock, Reggae, Dance, Film/TV Scoring, Electronica, Sound Design
- Occupations: Record Producer, Composer, Performer
- Instruments: Ukulele, Bass, Guitar, Banjo, Mandolin, Pedal Steel, Lap Steel, Percussion, Programming, Piano
- Years active: 1978–present
- Website: thebeatlescompleteonukulele.com

Roger McEvoy Greenawalt is an American record producer and musician, known for carrying a ukulele at all times everywhere he goes. Greenawalt has worked with Iggy Pop, Rufus Wainwright, Nils Lofgren, The Pierces, Ben Kweller, Ric Ocasek, Branford Marsalis, Joe Strummer, Philip Glass and many others. A story on Greenawalt's discovery of Kweller appeared in The New Yorker on April 7, 1997.

== Background ==
Greenawalt studied at Berklee College of Music in Boston from 1978 to 1980. In 1980 Greenawalt formed the "Sarcastic Post Punk No Wave Death Disco" band The Dark who, after gaining a loyal East Coast following, drew the interest of Ric Ocasek, lead singer and guitarist of The Cars. Ocasek produced The Dark's second EP, Darkworld, in 1982. A single, "Judy", became a local hit in Boston.

Over the last 30 years, Greenawalt has produced a wide variety of music, including records by bands such as Nils Lofgren, Ben Kweller, The Pierces, Eve's Plum, Anya Marina, Iggy Pop, Nellie McKay, Julian Velard and Eric Hutchinson. Stylistically he is known for his experimental approach to pop music and careful attention to lead vocals. Allison Pierce: "I credit Greenawalt with opening our minds to new possibilities of what our music could and should be."

=== Beatles Complete On Ukulele ===
On December 8, 2004, Greenawalt first performed his Beatles Complete On Ukulele concert by playing all 185 original Beatles songs in one day on ukulele with 60 guest singers at Elizabeth Streb's SLAM Action Lab in Brooklyn, New York. In 2008, he did the same show again at Brooklyn's Spike Hill. Since then, Greenawalt has performed the marathon show three more times at Brooklyn Bowl and three years running at SXSW in Austin, Texas (2010, 2011). Greenawalt performed an abridged version near San Francisco at The McEvoy Ranch Harvest Festival in November 2010. Performers at these various concerts have included Nellie McKay, The Naked Brothers Band, The Pierces, Adam Green, Ryan Miller of Guster, Jeremiah Birnbaum, and Freedy Johnston. Greenawalt has an accompanying web site Beatles Complete On Ukulele where he is rerecording original Beatles songs on ukulele. He releases a new track periodically with an original essay about the song.

== Discography ==
- 1980 – Personalized Tapes The Dark DarkWorld Industries Custom Tapes made for and about notable music business personalities
- 1981 – You Are In No Danger The Dark DarkWorld Industries 3 song EP featuring "Judy" about Judy Grunwald of The Maps
- 1982 – Darkworld, The Dark (Ambiguous Records, Produced by Ric Ocasek)
- 1982 – Beatitude, Ric Ocasek (Geffen Records) – Guitar
- 1983 – Don't Feed The Fashion Sharks, The Dark (Relativity Records)
- 1984 – Love Is Bigger Than Both Of Us, Frank Jargon And The Photo Opportunity, (Self Released Composer, Lead Vocals, Guitar
- 1987 – Times De Are Changing Soweto Soleil, (Jah Jah Music)Recorded at Tuff Gong Studios Kingston, Jamaica, Producer, Bass
- 1990 – Willi Jones, (Geffen Records) Guitar, Composer, Producer
- 1991 – The Poppies, (WEA) – Co-founder, Producer, Composer, Guitar, Bass Vocals, Programming, Percussion
- 1992 – Eve's Plum (Epic Records) – Producer, Engineer,
- 1992 – The Manson Family, An Opera, John Moran, featuring Iggy Pop and Terri Roche (Point Records) – Producer, Engineer, Bass, Programming
- 1993 – "Damn I Wish I Were Your Lover", Sophie B. Hawkins (Columbia Records) – Guitar
- 1992 – Frankenhooker (Glickenhaus Films) – Composer
- 1994 – The Murmurs (MCA Records) – Producer, engineer, bass
- 1995 – "Damaged Goods," Nils Lofgren (Rounder Records) – Producer, engineer, bass
- 1997 – Don't Speak (remix), No Doubt (Interscope Records) – Engineer, Guitar
- 1997 – Radish, led by 15-year-old Ben Kweller (Mercury Records) – Producer, Engineer
- 2003 – Ashley MacIsaac, (Decca Records) – Producer, Engineer, Composer
- 2004 – Want Two, Rufus Wainwright (DreamWorks Records) – Banjo, Ukulele,
- 2005 – Ben Kweller, Albert Hammond, Jr. "Wait" This Bird Has Flown The Beatles' Rubber Soul, (ATO Records) – Producer
- 2006 – What I Like About Jew Rob Tannenbaum/Sean Altman – Producer, Engineer
- 2006 – I Think I'll Move, Aberfeldy (Rough Trade) – Producer, Engineer, Mix, Slide guitar
- 2006 – Call An Ambulance, Albert Hammond, Jr. (Rough Trade) – Ukulele
- 2007 – The Movies Without You, Julian Velard (EMI UK) – Producer, Engineer, Mix
- 2007 – Thirteen Tales of Love and Revenge, The Pierces (Lizard King) – Producer, Engineer, Mix, Composer, Guitar, Bass, Ukulele, Mandolin, Percussion, Programming
- 2008 – These Bricks Are Bleeding, Rex Moroux – Producer, Engineer, Mix, Composer, Guitar, Bass, Mandolin, Percussion
- 2008 – Alan Cohen Experience, Alan Cohen Experience – Producer, Engineer, Mix
- 2009 – Jessie Murphy In The Woods, Eight Belles – Producer, Engineer, Mix, Guitar, Bass,
- 2009–Present The Beatles Complete On Ukulele – Creator, Producer, Engineer, Mix, Ukulele, Bass, Programming, Percussion
- 2009 – Eat the Peace, Alan Cohen Experience – Producer
- 2010 – Spinning In Time, Craig Greenberg – Producer, engineer, Bass,
- 2010 – The Lonely Crowd, Ether – Producer, Engineer, Mix, Bass
- 2011 – You And I, The Pierces – Producer, Engineer, Guitar, Bass
- 2011 – Song For Troy Davis, Nellie McKay – Producer, Engineer, Mix
- 2013 – Afro-Jersey featuring Terre Roche. Credits: Producing, Engineering.
- 2014 – Anya Marina, self-released, Anya Marina Plays Well With Others. Credits: Producing, Engineering, Mixing, Guitar, Co-Writer
- 2015 – Eric Hutchinson, Title to be announced, Warner Bros. Credits: Producing, Engineering
