= Some Velvet Morning (band) =

Some Velvet Morning are a British indie / alternative rock band consisting of Desmond Lambert (vocals, guitar), Rob Flanagan (drums) and Gavin Lambert (bass, vocals). Formed in 2000, they have released four albums: Silence Will Kill You, Allies, Musical Chairs and Rough Seas. Across these four album releases, they have continued to build a series of film and TV placements for their music with brands including Renault, Volkswagen, Haig Club, Pull & Bear and The Grand Tour.

== Band History ==
Some Velvet Morning – Group Photograph

The band, named after the song Some Velvet Morning by Nancy Sinatra & Lee Hazlewood, was formed as a result of a chance meeting between Rob Flanagan (formerly part of an early lineup for the 22-20s) and Desmond Lambert in Denmark Street – London's historic equivalent of Tin Pan Alley. The pair agreed to meet for a jam in Harrow, where coincidentally they both lived at the time. Lambert brought in his brother Gavin on bass, whilst Flanagan later asked a recent acquaintance, Yann McCullough to join on keyboards.

The band's debut appearance took place at The Rock Garden, London in 2001, followed by a series of shows at the famous Cavern Club in Liverpool, a city where Flanagan had previously resided as a student at Paul McCartney's Liverpool Institute for Performing Arts. During this time, Yann McCullough worked as a runner at Air-Edel studios in London. This led to the band cutting their first demos out of hours, whilst building a following on the London club circuit.

In 2003, McCullough left the band to pursue a career as a film music composer and editor. The band decided to continue as a trio, with a brief foray into material inspired by the then current crop of modern R 'n' B artists. Combining this genre with their older soul/rock based originals, the band came to the attention of manager Vicki Wickham and Nona Hendryx, formerly of Labelle. The duo were in London looking for artists to sign to their new label, Rhythmbank Entertainment. After an audition by the band (fresh from a residency season in Cannes), Some Velvet Morning were signed to the label in 2004.

2005 was a period of development for the band, with the label assembling a team, including A&R man Tris Penna to work with Wickham and Hendryx. Heavily influenced by The White Stripes, Franz Ferdinand and other emerging indie acts, Some Velvet Morning's new material began to take on a heavier rock feel, with two songs Losing My Mind and Godless emerging as the blueprint for material to come. Under the direction of producer Rik Simpson, the band cut masters of these two songs at Mayfair Studios in 2006, followed by the album Silence Will Kill You at The Fish Factory Studios in London, where they also worked with producer Mike Pelanconi (a.k.a. Prince Fatty).

Some Velvet Morning continued to perform live around the UK supporting the radio success of Losing My Mind. A tour of the east coast of America followed with the release of Silence Will Kill You in October 2007, supported by a TV debut appearance on Fox 5's Fearless Music show. Due to BBC Radio 2's support for the album in the UK, the band also made their live radio debut on Janice Long's show later that year.

Shortly after the release of Silence Will Kill You, Rhythmbank Entertainment went into liquidation, leaving the band without a label at the start of 2008. During this period, Some Velvet Morning began writing new material which would attract the attention of music manager, James Wilkinson (the band had two previous managers for short periods – Jo Beckett & Natalie Plessis). Wilkinson had met Rob Flanagan at an Ivor Novello Awards party and the two struck up an immediate friendship. He had been impressed by the band's new demos and their recent successful trip to Bangkok as part of a Heineken Green Space festival.

The first publicity stunt of the Wilkinson-Some Velvet Morning partnership was a rooftop concert tribute to The Beatles, played on the top of the PRS For Music building in London, 40 years after the Fab Four had played their farewell show in Savile Row at the Apple headquarters. Although performing a set of original material, the band did end with a coda of the Lennon–McCartney song "Don't Let Me Down". Like the original show, the local authorities investigated the performance due to concerns of excessive noise levels.

With his background in film and TV music, Wilkinson scooped the band a key music placement in 2010 – the international trailer for Matthew Vaughn's Kick-Ass film. The exposure led to further interest from Jimmy Mikaoui & Paul Rene Albertini at a new Anglo-French crowdfunding label called My Major Company. In 2010, the band joined the roster of a number of hopeful acts, aiming to raise money on the new platform to make an album. In just six weeks, Some Velvet Morning raised £100,000 and signed to My Major Company for the production of their second album, Allies.

With Desmond Lambert's rising experience as a producer, the band spent 2011 working on material and recording in London and Brighton for the Allies album, in between UK festival appearances. A second trip to Bangkok that summer found the band performing at the 'Heavyweight Rock The Ring' festival and retaining the boxing ring theme to shoot the video for the first single from Allies, Don't Think. 2012 saw the international release of Allies, which the band extensively toured into 2013, with live performances across Europe and particularly in France, where My Major Company secured healthy radio exposure for the single How To Start A Revolution. The 2013 tour culminated with a second headline appearance at Masillia Rock in Marseille.

Parting ways with My Major Company, who had closed their UK operation, another chapter also closed with James Wilkinson standing down as the band manager in late 2013, yet a partnership with Wilkinson on film and TV placements has continued. 2014 saw the band perform regular shows at the Roundhouse in London including a collaboration with choreographer Andy Turner for the Wella Trendvision Awards, where the band performed re-worked versions of Losing My Mind, How To Start A Revolution and Stone Cold for the fashion show. They also teamed up with veteran UK rock band, The Yardbirds, for a one-off show at London's Bush Hall venue.

Towards the end of 2015, Some Velvet Morning began thinking about a new way to release their new material. The result was the idea of writing, recording and issuing one song a month digitally for 2016. A physical EP Musical Chairs (with the first three singles plus a bonus track) was released to coincide with the band's London Roundhouse appearance in March. Eventually the 12 songs were compiled as an album, Musical Chairs at the end of 2016.

Due to the band's success with How To Start A Revolution being placed in a pan European advertisement for Renault, Some Velvet Morning were booked by the Transformation Trust to appear at Wembley Arena in the summer of 2017 with The Vamps.

Several songs from Musical Chairs plus others from the band's catalogue provided the basis for the soundtrack to Boudica Entertainment's Kat And the Band feature film, starring Ella Hunt and Dougie Poynter from McFly, which went into production in 2018, but was finally released in 2020.

2020 presented the band with a unique challenge of completing their album, Rough Seas separately during the Coronavirus lockdown. With the basic tracks already recorded in London, the album was completed in Westport, Eire and saw a reunion with Rik Simpson as Executive Producer. The album Rough Seas was released in March 2021. Good To See You became a regular fixture on broadcasts for Sky Sports and the BBC 2020 Euro Highlights, as fans returned to the sports stadiums after the coronavirus pandemic.

== Band Members ==
- Desmond Lambert – vocals, Guitars, Keyboards (2001 to present)
- Rob Flanagan – drums (2001 to present)
- Gavin Lambert – bass guitar, vocals (2001 to present)

Previous Members:

- Yann McCullough – keyboards (2001–2003)

== Discography ==
=== Albums ===
- Silence Will Kill You (2007)
- Allies (2012)
- Musical Chairs (2016)
- Rough Seas (2021)

== Silence Will Kill You ==
'Silence Will Kill You' album cover

Released: 9 October 2007. Label: Rhythmbank Entertainment.

Track listing:

1. "Losing My Mind" (3.48)
2. "Propaganda" (2:57) *
3. "The Nightshift" (4:22)
4. "Pretty Girl" (3:02)
5. "Stolen Love Song" (2:59) *
6. "Stone Cold" (4:14)
7. "One Day You'll Love The Things You Hate" (4:09)
8. "Godless" (3:27)
9. "Settle Down" (3:29)
10. "Let The Good Times Come My Way" (3:43) ***
11. "The Madness Of Crowds" (3:33) **

All songs written by Desmond Lambert, Rob Flanagan & Gavin Lambert.

Produced by Rik Simpson & Some Velvet Morning except * Produced by Desmond Lambert ** Produced by Mike Pelanconi & Some Velvet Morning. *** Produced by Mike Pelanconi, Rik Simpson & Some Velvet Morning.

=== Album Background ===
Some Velvet Morning were signed in 2005 to Rhythmbank Entertainment, founded by music manager Vicki Wickham and Nona Hendryx, formerly of Labelle. The sessions for the band's first recordings took place at Mayfair Studios in Hampstead with producer Rik Simpson. The band recorded their first single, "Losing My Mind" and "Godless", which was later remixed for the album, 'Silence Will Kill You'.

The band moved studios to The Fish Factory in Willesden. Working again with Rik Simpson, the band recorded 5 further titles: "One Day You'll Love The Things You Hate', "Pretty Girl", "The Nightshift", "Let The Good Times Come My Way" and "Stone Cold" with Simpson augmenting the band on synths.

Producer Mike Pelanconi (a.k.a. Prince Fatty) was also engaged to work on three tracks "Stolen Love Song", "The Madness Of Crowds" and the unreleased "Fuel Crisis", the latter of which was the band's regular stage opener in this era. Pelanconi was also involved in the remix of "Godless" with Desmond Lambert from the band. Lambert took over production duties for the album's remaining numbers – the singles "Settle Down" and "Propaganda", as well as another unreleased recording – "Shine Some Light".

"Silence Will Kill You" was nominated for Radio X's album of the year in 2007. The band recorded three of the album tracks live for the BBC Radio 2 on the Janice Long show ("Losing My Mind", "One Day You'll Love The Things You Hate" and "Propaganda"). The singles "Losing My Mind" and "Propaganda" were staples of UK independent radio in 2007 and 2008 respectively with substantial support from Radio X.

To support the album, Some Velvet Morning toured the East Coast of America in the autumn of 2007, performing on Fox 5's "Fearless Music" TV show ("Losing My Mind" was broadcast although other titles were taped).

The album's title was taken from a song called "Silence Will Kill You" which was performed live and proposed as the band's follow up single to "Losing My Mind", but was not recorded. The artwork was designed by the band with New York artist Charlene Lanzal, who also designed the artwork for the band's "Pretty Girl" single. The artwork was inspired by a Russian propaganda poster from the second World War that the band had seen on a visit to a Moscow art gallery.

== Allies ==
'Allies' album cover

Released: 30 April 2012. Label: My Major Company.

Track listing:

1. "How To Start A Revolution" (3:06)
2. "Beautiful Dress" (3:34)
3. "Resistance" (3:07)
4. "National Valentine" (4:01)
5. "Hollywood" (3:37)
6. "Allies" (3:59)
7. "Times Like These" (3:53)
8. "Unterbrechen" (0:52)
9. "Don't Think" (3:30)
10. "Control" (3:33)
11. "NY City Cell" (4:20)
12. "Allies" (Reprise) (2:35)
13. "The River" (4:49)

All songs written by Desmond Lambert, Rob Flanagan & Gavin Lambert. Produced by Desmond Lambert.

=== Album Background ===
'Allies' is Some Velvet Morning's second album, released in 2012. The project began life as crowdfunding venture with Anglo-French label My Major Company, run in the UK by Jimmy Mikaoui and Paul Rene Albertini. My Major Company's initial target was to raise £100,000 to make and promote an album via fan investment.

Some Velvet Morning's manager at the time, James Wilkinson, worked extensively with the band and the label to raise the target amount, which was achieved in just six weeks due to a groundswell of enthusiasm from the band's fans and users of the My Major Company platform.

Recording again at The Fish Factory studio, the band spent the summer of 2011 working on the tracks for the album, which focused on a live 80s feel, similar to that of U2's War album. Several of the tracks had been recorded as masters prior to the involvement of My Major Company, issued by the band as promotional only releases – a four track eponymous EP featuring "Resistance", "National Valentine" and "Hollywood", with "Peace" which would later be re-worked as a single.

"How To Start A Revolution" had been recorded and issued as a promotional release several times, with the final master being mixed by the band and Blue May. A demo version of the track found its way on to the trailer for Matthew Vaughn's "Kick-Ass" trailer in 2010. The track remains one of the band's most popular placed tracks (most notably for Renault Megane's pan European "Experience" campaign in 2016 and is often the show closer for the band's live shows.

The band reunited with Mike Pelanconi for one track, 'Don't Think', which was recorded at the producer's private studio in Brighton. The track was issued with "Beautiful Dress" as a limited-edition gatefold vinyl single on 31 October 2011. A video for the single was filmed in Thailand with a female boxing theme, preceding the band's live appearance at the "Heavyweight Rock The Ring" festival.

The band toured Europe extensively in 2012 and 2013 promoting the album, most notably headlining the Massilia Rock festival twice in Marseille. The single "How To Start A Revolution" was heavily supported French radio, especially Oui FM, resulting in a live session where Desmond Lambert performed the single, together with a cover of U2's "New Year's Day". The video for "How To Start A Revolution" was filmed at Victoria Baths, a disused swimming pool in Manchester at the time. The final video mixed live performances from the band together with clips from "Kick-Ass".

The album title was inspired by fan support via the My Major Company platform, where fans (latterly nicknamed "Allies") were encouraged to give feedback on the material and recording process.

== Musical Chairs ==
'Musical Chairs' album cover

Released: 31 December 2016. Label: Rodega Music.

Track listing:

1. "Damocles" (4.00)
2. "No Walls" (3:53)
3. "Musical Chairs" (4:25)
4. "Mailer" (2:35)
5. "The Disappeared" (3:01)
6. "Hurricane" (3:27)
7. "Satellite" (3:16)
8. "Everyday Holiday" (3:51)
9. "Escape" (3:35)
10. "Someday, Someplace" (2:58)
11. "Noah's Ark" (4:26)
12. "Peace" (2:28)

All songs written by Desmond Lambert, Rob Flanagan & Gavin Lambert. Produced by Desmond Lambert.

=== Album Background ===
"Musical Chairs" is a 2016 compilation of singles issued that year by Some Velvet Morning. It is now considered to be the band's third album.

Beginning recording in late 2015, Some Velvet Morning set themselves a target to write, record and release a new track every month for one year, to be issued digitally and occasionally with an accompanying music video.

The first three singles, issued between Jan and Mar 2016 were compiled on a limited edition CD EP also called 'Musical Chairs', featuring similar artwork to the album. The EP featured the tracks "Damocles", "No Walls" (later used in an autumn/winter campaign for Pull & Bear) and "Musical Chairs", together with an acoustic track "Mailer" – a tribute to American novelist Norman Mailer.

Each single featured unique artwork with a blueprints theme, designed by the band, Constantin Lipatov and occasionally Colin Rozee, who also filmed performances of the band for the first three singles.

The use of "The Disappeared" in the Grand Tour (with "Losing My Mind" from the band's first album) and an Asian commercial for David Beckham's Haig Club Whisky, prompted the release of this track as a fourth single in April 2016.

Several songs from the album ("Damocles", "No Walls", "Musical Chairs" and "Satellite"), along with others by the band, provided the soundtrack for the 2020 UK film Kat and the Band, featuring Ella Hunt and Dougie Poynter from McFly. Poynter, along with other actors, lip-synched to the songs as a fictional band, 'Dollar Days', in the movie.

== Rough Seas ==
'Rough Seas' album cover

Released: 12 March 2021. Label: Rodega Music.

Track listing:

1. "Ghosts" (3:14)
2. "Rough Seas" (4:08) * +
3. "Magic Places" (3:34)
4. "Butterfly" (4:23) * +
5. "Good To See You" (3:07)
6. "Love Begins" (4:31)
7. "Hypnotising" (3:33) ** +
8. "Berlin" (3:10)
9. "Fragile" (3:12)
10. "After Goodbye" (4:33) +

All songs written by Desmond Lambert, Rob Flanagan & Gavin Lambert. Produced by Desmond Lambert. Executive Producers: Rik Simpson & Some Velvet Morning. Mastering by Emily Lazar & Chris Allgood at The Lodge, New York. Additional Musicians: Paul Jones (Harmonica) * Kele Le Roc (Backing Vocals) ** Chris Stopa +

=== Album Background ===
Whilst on holiday in Westport, Eire, an unintentional lockdown residency for Desmond & Gavin Lambert led to the completion of Some Velvet Morning's fourth album, 'Rough Seas'. Whilst most of the songs on the band's new album had been started in London with third band member and drummer Rob Flanagan, there was still work to be done.

The Lambert brothers were able to hire the local Clew Bay Recording Studio and have their instruments shipped over from the UK to complete overdubs on the unfinished masters. They were supported and assisted remotely by Rob Flanagan, 500 miles away in London.

Upon returning to London for final sessions at the Fish Factory in London, the band reunited with Coldplay producer Rik Simpson, who worked with the band on their debut album, 'Silence Will Kill You'. Simpson is credited for executive production and additional mixing roles on the album. Final mastering was provided by Grammy award-winning engineers Emily Lazar and Chris Allgood at The Lodge in New York.

"Good To See You" from the album became a fixture of UK sports TV over the summer of 2021, shortly after the release of the album. The song's reunion theme inspired media usage as crowds returned to sports stadiums, with placements on the BBC's coverage of the UEFA Euros 2020 and Sky Sports. The song was also to be placed in an Asian commercial for Volkswagen in August 2021.

Two additional songs from the album, "Ghosts" and "Rough Seas", feature in a UK independent film 'Love Without Walls' starring Niall McNamee and Shana Swash.

Several musicians augment the band on the album with guest appearances. These include Manfred Mann/Blues Band front man Paul Jones on harmonica for the title track and "Butterfly". Kele Le Roc and Sandie Shaw provide vocals on "Hypnotising" and "After Goodbye" respectively.
