= Creation (The Pierces album) =

Studio album by the Pierces
- Released: September 1, 2014
- Genre: Alternative rock, dream pop, folk rock, indie folk, indie pop, indie rock
- Length: 49:17
- Label: Polydor
- Producer: Christian Langdon

The Pierces chronology
You & I (2011)	Creation (2014)

Singles from Creation
- 1. "Kings" Released: January 31, 2014; 2. "Believe in Me" Released: March 31, 2014; 3. "Creation" Released: August 8, 2014; 4. "The Devil Is a Lonely Night" Released: November 5, 2014

Professional ratings
Aggregate scores
Source	Rating
AnyDecentMusic?	6.3/10
Metacritic	69/100
Review scores
Source	Rating
AllMusic	3.5/5 stars
The Guardian	4/5 stars
The Line of Best Fit	7.5/10
Mojo	3/5 stars
musicOMH	3/5 stars
Q	4/5 stars
Uncut	2.5/5 stars

Creation is the fifth studio album by American duo the Pierces, released on September 1, 2014, by Polydor Records. It reached No. 7 on the UK Albums Chart.

== Singles ==
- "Kings" was the first single released from the album, it was released on January 31, 2014. It reached number 191 in the UK, on 31 May.
- "Believe in Me" was the second single released from the album, it was released on March 31, 2014 and peaked at number 66 on the UK Singles Chart.
- The video for the next single "Creation" was premiered on August 8, 2014 and was directed by Nick Frew.
- The fourth and final single from the album was "The Devil Is a Lonely Night," released November 5, 2014.

== Track listing ==
No.	Title	Writer(s)	Length
1.	"Creation"	Catherine Pierce	3:44
2.	"Kings"	Catherine Pierce	4:03
3.	"I Can Feel"	Allison Pierce, Christian "Leggy" Langdon	4:23
4.	"Believe in Me"	Catherine Pierce	4:01
5.	"Come Alive"	Catherine Pierce	3:46
6.	"Honest Man"	Allison Pierce	3:56
7.	"Must Be Something"	Catherine Pierce, Langdon	3:44
8.	"Elements"	Allison Pierce, Ian Shea	4:10
9.	"Monsters"	Allison Pierce	3:19
10.	"The Devil Is a Lonely Night"	Catherine Pierce	3:58
11.	"Confidence In Love"	Catherine Pierce	4:00
12.	"The One I Want"	Allison Pierce	3:28
13.	"Flesh and Bone"	Catherine Pierce	4:45
Total length:			49:17

Creation Deluxe (Bonus Tracks)
No.	Title	Writer(s)	Length
14.	"Hold"	Catherine Pierce, Langdon	4:16
15.	"Strange Love"	Catherine Pierce	4:04
16.	"Chemical Reaction"	Catherine Pierce	3:54
Total length:			60:51

== Personnel ==
- Allison Pierce – lead & backing vocals, acoustic guitar, songwriting
- Catherine Pierce – lead & backing vocals, songwriting
