= Believe in Me (The Pierces song) =

Single by The Pierces

from the album Creation
- Released: 31 March 2014
- Length: 4:01
- Label: Polydor
- Songwriter(s): Catherine Pierce
- Producer(s): Christian Langdon

The Pierces singles chronology
"Kings" (2014)	"Believe in Me" (2014)	"Creation" (2014)

"Believe in Me" is a song by American duo The Pierces, released in 2014 as the second single from their fifth studio album Creation. It was written by Catherine Pierce and produced by Christian Langdon.

A music video was released on 18 February to promote the single. The song reached No. 66 on the UK Singles Chart and No. 59 on the Scottish Singles Chart.

== Critical reception ==
Upon release, Matt Collar of AllMusic described the song as "buoyant '60s girl group-infused", which "retain[s] all of the duo's bright and infectious lyricism". David Smyth of the London Evening Standard commented that the song "sounds like a golden hit and a startling departure from the Gothic Americana that made their name". Molloy Woodcraft of The Guardian considered the song "catchy" and highlighted the "Florence-esque bass drum and handclaps".

Lisa-Marie Ferla of The Arts Desk commented that the song was a "gorgeous drive-time radio ballad in the best of ways, all hand claps and huge choruses". Lauren James of Contactmusic.com noted the song's use of "handclaps, high production and heart-rending harmony". Andy Baber of MusicOMH wrote: "While tracks such as "Believe in Me" and "Elements" are perfectly serviceable, neither is likely to stick in the mind long after it comes to an end."

== Chart performance ==
Chart (2014)	Peak position
Scottish Singles Chart	59
UK Singles Chart	66

== Personnel ==
The Pierces

- Catherine Pierce - lead vocals
- Allison Pierce - backing vocals

Additional personnel

- Christian "Leggy" Langdon - acoustic guitar, electric guitar, synthesizer, percussion, producer, programming, engineer
- Josiah Steinbrick - electric guitar
- Jonny Cragg - drums, percussion
- Mark "Spike" Stent - mixing
- Chris Claypool - engineer
- Bob Ludwig - mastering
