= Darkworld =

Play-by-mail fantasy and science fiction game

- Publishers: Michael Williams
- Years active: 1982 to unknown
- Genres: role-playing, play-by-mail
- Languages: English
- Playing time: unlimited
- Materials required: Instructions, order sheets, turn results, paper, pencil
- Media type: Play-by-mail

Darkworld is a roleplaying play-by-mail (PBM) game.

== History and development ==
Darkworld was a roleplaying, play-by-mail game published by Michael Williams. It was launched in 1982. It was open-ended and hand moderated.

As of the end of 1987, the game had approximately 100 players. By then, only 53 of 900 "blocks" had been explored, with blocks comprising 1,750 sectors. The game map included over 1.5 million sectors.

== Gameplay ==
Gameplay occurred on the planet of Darkworld. Players could roleplay one of 40 available races. Multiple roleplaying settings were available, allowing players to "take on the gods, fight the evil orcs, delve into the realms of magics, become a king, or just do nothing". Turns could be played weekly, and included both normal and special actions, the latter requiring narrative descriptions of a desired action. Game elements included combat, construction, diplomacy, economics, and location (or movement). Magic was also a key part of the game. Players could encounter "cities, castles, temples, ruins, dimensional gates, underground valleys, and twelve different types of terrain" with cities as a hub for many activities.

== Reception ==
PBM Universal's editor, Bob McLain, reviewed Darkworld in its first 1983 issue. He stated that it was "A 'must' for whomever wants non-stop fun." Bill Dunne reviewed the game in a 1985 issue of Flagship, praising its diversity of game settings and possibilities. He stated it was a "standard style of role-playing game with little player interaction and with a creative gamemaster, who puts you in a very nonstandard scenario".

== See also ==
- List of play-by-mail games

== Bibliography ==
- Dunne, Bill (Summer 1985). "Darkworld: Intersection of a Thousand Fantasies". Flagship. No. 7. pp. 14–15.
- Loth III, John Kevin (March–April 1987). "A Turn of the Darkworld". Paper Mayhem. No. 23. pp. 13–14.
- McLain, Bob (November–December 1983). "Gamealog: Darkworld". PBM Universal. No. 1. p. 28.
- Webber, Dave (March–April 1984). "Darkworld: A Review...". Paper Mayhem. No. 5. p. 10.
- Williams, Michael (Summer 1985). "Darkworld [Ad]". Flagship. No. 7. p. 13.
- Williams, Mike (December 1987 – January 1988). "Tales from the Dark Side". The D2 Report. No. 15. pp. 20–21.
