= James Levy =

American singer-songwriter

- Born: James Levy; Vermont, U.S.
- Genre: Indie rock
- Occupations: Singer-songwriter; producer; musician
- Instrument: Vocals
- Years active: 2005–present
- Labels: Cult; Innit; Heavenly; One Little Indian; Polydor
- Website: Reputante

James Levy is an American, New York-based singer, songwriter, and producer.

Levy co-wrote and produced Charles Bradley's posthumous 2019 release Lonely as You Are, which Rolling Stone magazine called a "devastating masterclass." Another Charles Bradley single, Lucifer, was released in May 2019. Levy was formerly the lead singer for the band Reputante, whose debut EP Oceanside was released in November 2013 on Cult Records. The record was produced by Tim Wheeler of the band Ash. A music video for the song "Deep Set Eyes" premiered in December 2013 in The Huffington Post. In early 2013, Reputante toured the US with UK band The Maccabees. and prior to that toured with Ash.

Levy is also a former member of the band Lolawolf along with Zoë Kravitz, Jimmy Giannopoulos, and Raviv Ullman.

In 2012, James put out a record under the band name James Levy and The Blood Red Rose, which features Allison Pierce of The Pierces. Their album, Pray to Be Free, was released by Heavenly Recordings (2012) and received critical acclaim, including being included in the list of the top 100 albums of 2012 by French publication Les Inrocks. The album, produced by Coldplay bass player Guy Berryman, received four star reviews in MOJO, Q and Uncut magazines and was praised by the BBC, The Independent and The Sunday Times of London. US music magazine Popdose and UK publication indieLondon included the record on their top ten lists for 2012.

A single, Sneak into My Room, spent several weeks in rotation and on the playlist of BBC Radio 6 Music and was featured as Q Magazine's "Track of the Day." A music video for "Hung To Dry," directed by Steve Birnbaum, was named one of the top 50 indie music videos of 2012. The band made other music videos featuring Brooklyn singers Aerial East ("Give Me Happiness") and Turner Cody ("Positively East Broadway").

James Levy and The Blood Red Rose performed live in session on several national radio shows in the UK, including sessions on BBC Radio 2 with both Jo Whiley and Dermot O'Leary and a session on BBC 6 Music with Lauren Laverne. The performance with Dermot O'Leary featured a cover of the Oasis track "Don't Look Back in Anger."

Earlier in his career, Levy was the lead singer of the band LEVY, which released two albums on UK independent label One Little Indian. The band's debut album, Rotten Love, was included in a list by NME of "The 100 Greatest Albums You've Never Heard." A video for the song "Rotten Love" was featured on NME.com.

The title track of LEVY's second record, Glorious, was covered by The Pierces and released as a single on their 2011 Polydor UK gold-certified album You & I. It received top ten airplay in the UK and was A-listed on BBC National Radio. The single peaked at No. 176 on the UK Singles Charts.

Levy has also released solo material under the names Promising Young Talent and YVEL; additionally, he released the album Blood Red Rose in 2008.
