= Julian Velard =

American singer

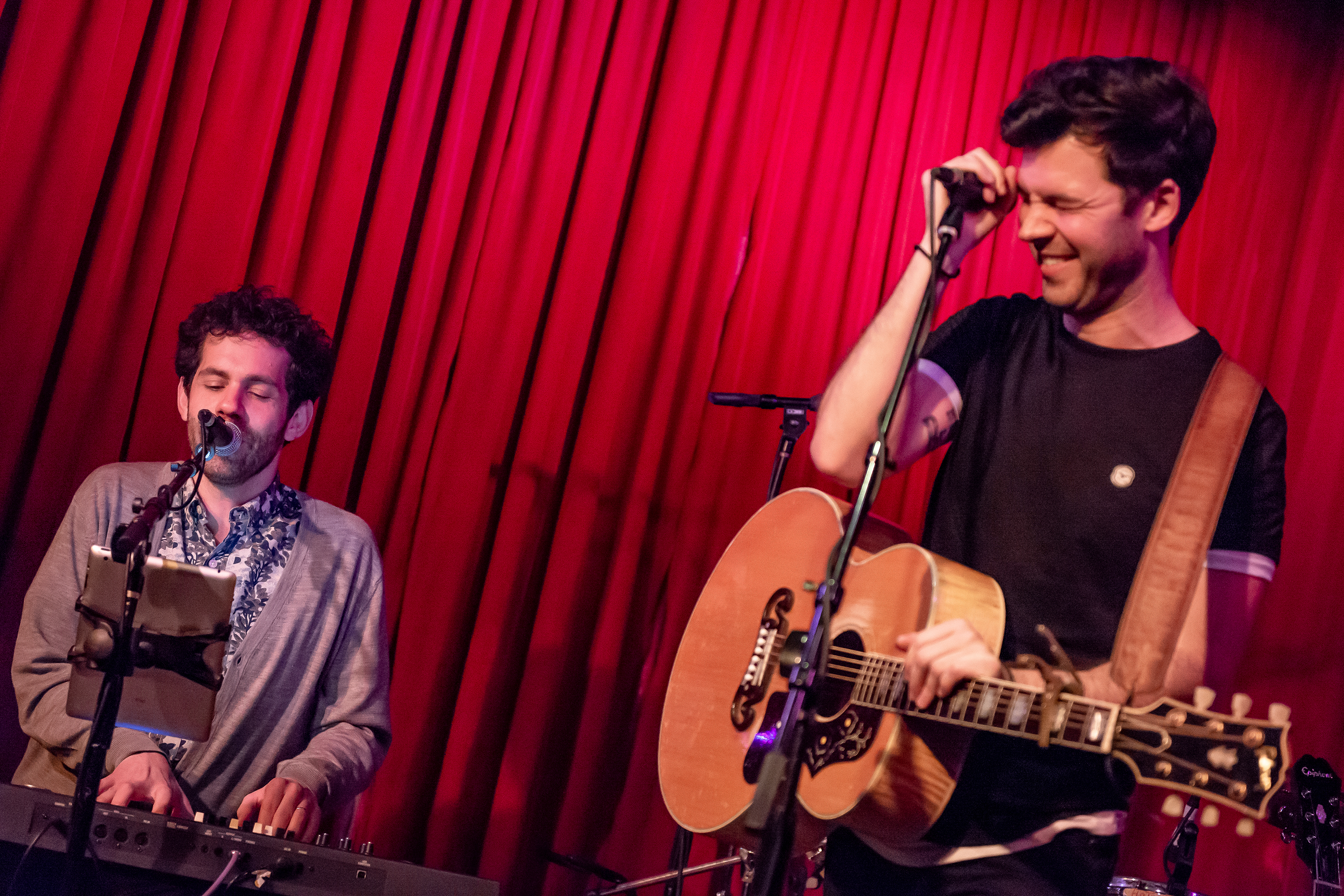

Background information
- Born: Julian Adam Velard; October 6, 1979 (age 47); New York City, New York, U.S.
- Genres: Singer/Songwriter, Pop
- Instruments: Vocals; Piano; Keyboards
- Years active: 2001–present
- Labels: Lucky Number (2007); Angel Music (2007–2008); Virgin Records (2008–2009); Planeteer Records (2010–2012); Chloebro LTD (2013-Present)
- Website: www.JulianVelard.com

Julian Velard (born October 6, 1979) is an American pianist, singer-songwriter, and composer born and raised in New York City.

== Early life ==
Velard was born in New York City on the Upper West Side on Manhattan. His mother, Margaret is a former singing cocktail waitress, and his father, Maxime, was a hidden child during the Holocaust who emigrated from Paris in 1963; he worked in computers and designed the technology for the first ATM for Citibank.

== Education ==
Velard attended Fiorello H. LaGuardia High School. He then attended Hampshire College in Amherst, Massachusetts where he majored in composition. There he studied with Jazz legend Yusef Lateef. During college, he spent a semester abroad in Paris where he studied with pianist Kirk Lightsey.

== Musical career ==
Upon graduating college, Velard moved to Brooklyn and began his career as a professional musician. Gigging at night, he supported himself by working as a nursery school gym teacher. In 2003 he released his debut album, Nitetime.

In the fall of 2006 Velard released an EP entitled The Movies Without You, produced by Roger Greenawalt. In 2007, Velard signed a multi-album record deal with Angel Music Group and subsequently moved to London. The following year he was the opening act for Amy Macdonald on her This Is The Life UK Tour.

In June 2008 EMI eliminated 2,000 positions worldwide and Velard's major label debut, The Planeteer, was shelved. In early 2009 after a short stint at Virgin Records, Velard was dropped.

In November 2009 Velard released The Planeteer independently. Soon after Olly Murs recorded Velard's song "Hold On" for his debut album which went on to go 2× platinum in the UK.

In 2011, Velard released the album Mr. Saturday Night through Universal Music Group. The album was also released in the Netherlands due to an online discovery by radio and TV host Gerard Ekdom. After connecting with Ekdom, Velard played on Serious Request and headlined a show at Paradiso in Amsterdam.

In July 2012, his song about New York Knicks' Jeremy Lin was featured in The New York Times.

On June 16, 2014, Velard released a New York City concept album titled, If You Don't Like It, You Can Leave. The album received a positive review on Popdose.

On October 5, 2015, Velard released, "The Night Ed Sheeran Slept On My Couch". The song was featured on Popcrush and in The Guardian. The song is based on actual events.

On November 18, 2015, Velard appeared for the first time on The Wrap-Up Show. Velard has since become a regular on the show, and several of his original, improvised songs have been played on The Howard Stern Show.

On June 16, 2017, Velard released a nine-song LP entitled, Fancy Words For Failure. The Wall Street Journal published a profile of Velard and his year long residency at Joe's Pub.

In January 2018, Velard's H.P. Joelcraft, a mash up of Billy Joel's Pianoman and H.P. Lovecraft's Nemesis, was featured on The Nerdist, Polygon, The A.V Club, Mashable, and Bloody Disgusting among others.

Velard's auto-biographical concept album and musical entitled Please Don't Make Me Play Piano Man was released in May 2020. The accompanying show received a rave review in Broadway World, naming it one of the best shows of 2020.

== Discography ==
Studio albums

- 2003 Nitetime
- 2009 The Planeteer
- 2011 Mr. Saturday Night
- 2014 If You Don't Like It, You Can Leave
- 2017 Fancy Words For Failure
- 2020 Please Don't Make Me Play Piano Man
- 2025 In The Middle Of Something

EPs, singles and live recordings

- 2003 Make Me Feel
- 2006 The Movies Without You
- 2009 Another Guy's Song
- 2012 The Mighty Lin
- 2012 Person Of Interest
- 2013 Tiny Aeroplane
- 2015 The Night Ed Sheeran Slept On My Couch
- 2018 Sad Dad
- 2019 Comfort Zone

== Track listing: The Planeteer ==
All songs written by Julian Velard except where noted:

1. "Joni" – 3:53
2. "Automatic" – 3:35
3. "Little Demons" – 4:44
4. "End of an Era" – 4:31
5. "Jimmy Dean & Steve McQueen" – 3:45
6. "Merry Go Round" – 2:53
7. "Do it Alone" – 3:28
8. "All in All" – 3:58
9. "A Dream" – 4:16
10. "Been this Strange" – 4:04
11. "Love Again for the First Time (Acoustic)" – 3:35 (Julian Velard, Martin Brammer)

== Track listing: Mr. Saturday Night ==
All songs written by Julian Velard, Jerry Abbott, and Grant Black except where noted:

1. "Me And My Mirror On A Saturday Night" – 3:39
2. "Love Again For The First Time" – 3:42 (Julian Velard, Martin Brammer)
3. "Sentimental" – 2:56 (Julian Velard, Lol Creme, Jerry Abbott, Grant Black)
4. "No Wrong" – 3:28
5. "Fellow Americans" – 3:28
6. "On To Something" – 2:40
7. "Soundtrack Of My Life" – 3:18 (Julian Velard, Jerry Abbott, Grant Black, Shridhar Solanki)
8. "The Guy Who..." – 3:16
9. "Everybody Wants To Be Famous" – 3:10
10. "Still In Love" – 3:05
11. "Take the Money and Run" – 3:19
12. "Another Guy's Song" - 3:51 (Julian Velard)
