= You'll Be Mine (The Pierces song) =

Single by The Pierces

from the album You & I
- Released: 6 March 2011
- Genre: Indie folk
- Length: 3:24
- Label: Polydor Records
- Songwriter(s): Catherine Pierce

The Pierces singles chronology
"You'll Be Mine" (2011)	"Glorious" (2011)

"You'll Be Mine" is a single by New York-based band The Pierces. It is the first single released from their fourth studio album You & I. It was released on March 6, 2011 as a Digital download and on 7 March 2011 on CD.

== Music video ==
The music video was uploaded to YouTube on January 28, 2011.

== Track listing ==
No.	Title	Writer(s)	Length
1.	"You'll Be Mine"	Catherine Pierce	3:24
2.	"Piece Of You"	Catherine Pierce	3:57
3.	"Me And Him"	Allison Pierce	3:16
4.	"You'll Be Mine (Live Acoustic)"	Catherine Pierce	3:06

== Chart performance ==
Chart (2011)	Peak position
UK Singles (The Official Charts Company)	46

== Release history ==
Country	Date	Format	Label
United Kingdom	6 March 2011	Digital download	Polydor Records
United Kingdom	7 March 2011	CD	Polydor Records
United States	September 13, 2011	Digital download	Polydor Records
