= Rattlesnake Remedy =

British hard rock band

Background information
- Origin: Birmingham, England
- Genres: Rock, blues rock
- Label: BEM Records (UK)
- Spinoffs: Caduga
- Past members: Lee Stone; Ben Bartlett; Mark Buckler; Matt Birch; Dave Ballard; Craig Stone; Adam Jones

Rattlesnake Remedy was a hard rock band from Birmingham, England. Known for their live shows, the band released a critically well received album, Magic Man, and achieved a top 10 hit on the UK Rock Chart. Its members changed their name to Caduga in 2009.

== History ==
The band was formed in 2003 by Lee Stone and Dave Ballard, who had met whilst at school, and were joined by Mark Buckler, Matt Birch, and Ben Bartlett. They spent several years on the live music circuit, becoming known for "phenomenal live shows". In 2006 they recorded an album called Magic Man, which was released in the UK and Ireland on 30 October on BEM Records and distributed by Universal Music Group. The album received positive critical reception, including a 9/10 rating in Rock Hard magazine and a 4* rating in the Birmingham Mail. It was also recommended by both the Belfast Telegraph and the Total Guitar magazine.

The first single from the album, "Drag You Down", was released on 1 May 2006 and spent 8 weeks in the UK Rock Chart, peaking at number 4. This and other tracks appeared in Classic Rock, Player Magazine, and Metal Hammer. Promotion of the single and new album began with the Drag You Down tour running through 2006. The music video to the album's title track was released in October 2006. The band continued to tour throughout 2007, and released a re-mastered version of Magic Man, with bonus tracks, in Japan and Europe in November 2007. The remastered, extended version of Magic Man was released on 21 November 2007 in Japan and 21 February 2008 in most European territories.

In 2009, whilst recording their new studio album, the band announced that they would be changing their name to Caduga. They justified this change to their fans with a famous Picasso quote - "Every act of creation is first of all an act of destruction." The band split in 2011, after playing one last gig as Caduga. Their final album, Kidnap the Sun, remains unreleased.

== Discography ==
=== Singles and EPs ===
- 2006 Drag You Down EP ("Drag You Down", "Reach for the Line", "Killing Time", "Angel's Eyes")
- 2006 Drag You Down Single ("Drag You Down", "Black Sheep Fiddle", "Hangover Blues [Live]")

=== Albums ===
- 2003 Rattlesnake Remedy
1. "So Damn Tight"
2. "Round Again"
3. "Don't Call"
4. "Falling Away"
5. "Tickin' Again"
6. "Killing Time"
7. "Angel's Eyes"
8. "The Flame (Never Die)"
9. "Dancing with the Devil"
10. "When Will I See You Again"
- 2006 Magic Man
1. "Black Sheep Fiddle" - 4:05
2. "Drag You Down" - 4:16
3. "Free to Feel" - 3:50
4. "Payin' My Dues" - 3.16
5. "Reach for the Line" - 3.07
6. "Killing Time" - 3.59
7. "Angel's Eyes" - 3.47
8. "Nothing Right" - 5.02
9. "Falling Away" - 2.43
10. "Freestyle" - 4.02
11. "Magic Man" - 5.11
12. "Don't Say Goodbye" - 2.40
- 2007 Magic Man Japanese version (4 bonus tracks)
1. "Black Sheep Fiddle" - 4:05
2. "Drag You Down" - 4:16
3. "Free to Feel" - 3:50
4. "Payin' My Dues" - 3.16
5. "Reach for the Line" - 3.07
6. "Killing Time" - 3.59
7. "Angel's Eyes" - 3.47
8. "Nothing Right" - 5.02
9. "Falling Away" - 2.43
10. "Freestyle" - 4.02
11. "Magic Man" - 5.11
12. "Don't Say Goodbye" - 2.40
13. "Up in Smoke" - 4.45
14. "When Will I See You Again" - 3.16
15. "Lonely Avenue (Live)" - 3.07
16. "Hangover Blues (Live)" - 4.14
