= Thirteen Tales of Love and Revenge =

Studio album by The Pierces
- Released: March 20, 2007
- Studios: Shabby Road Studio (Williamsburg, Brooklyn, New York)
- Genres: Folk rock; indie pop
- Length: 47:04
- Label: Lizard King
- Producer: Roger Greenawalt

The Pierces chronology
Light of the Moon (2004)	Thirteen Tales of Love and Revenge (2007)	You & I (2011)

Thirteen Tales of Love and Revenge is the third studio album by American duo The Pierces, released on March 20, 2007 by Lizard King Records.

"Three Wishes" and "Secret" appeared in an episode of the television series Gossip Girl, titled "Hi, Society". The episode aired on December 5, 2007 and features a cameo appearance by The Pierces. The music videos for "Boring" and the Gossip Girl Version of "Secret" were also included on the season 1 DVD.

"Secret" is also the theme song for the television series Pretty Little Liars (2010) and some of its lyrics are quoted during an episode in the second season, titled "Over My Dead Body". In 2019, a cover version of "Secret" was performed by Denmark + Winter, and served as the theme for the third Pretty Little Liars series, The Perfectionists. A remix version was used as the theme for the first season of the fourth series in the franchise, Pretty Little Liars (2022). The song was later covered again in the second season performed by Transviolet.

The Pierces themselves later released their new version of "Secret" titled "Secret 2020", on June 23, 2020.

== Track listing ==
All tracks are written by Catherine Pierce, Allison Pierce and Roger Greenawalt, except where noted. All tracks produced by Greenawalt.

No.	Title	Length
1.	"Secret" (C. Pierce)	3:48
2.	"Boring"	3:27
3.	"Sticks and Stones"	3:11
4.	"Lights On"	3:48
5.	"Lies"	3:28
6.	"Turn on Billie" (C. Pierce)	3:48
7.	"Ruin" (A. Pierce)	3:32
8.	"Three Wishes" (C. Pierce)	3:41
9.	"The Power of..." (A. Pierce)	3:54
10.	"Kill! Kill! Kill!" (C. Pierce)	3:03
11.	"It Was You" (A. Pierce)	3:42
12.	"Boy in a Rock and Roll Band" (C. Pierce)	3:37
13.	"Go to Heaven" (A. Pierce)	4:05

== Charts ==
Chart (2007–09)	Peak position
French Albums (SNEP)	134
US Heatseekers Albums (Billboard)	25
