= Another Sky (band) =

English post-rock band

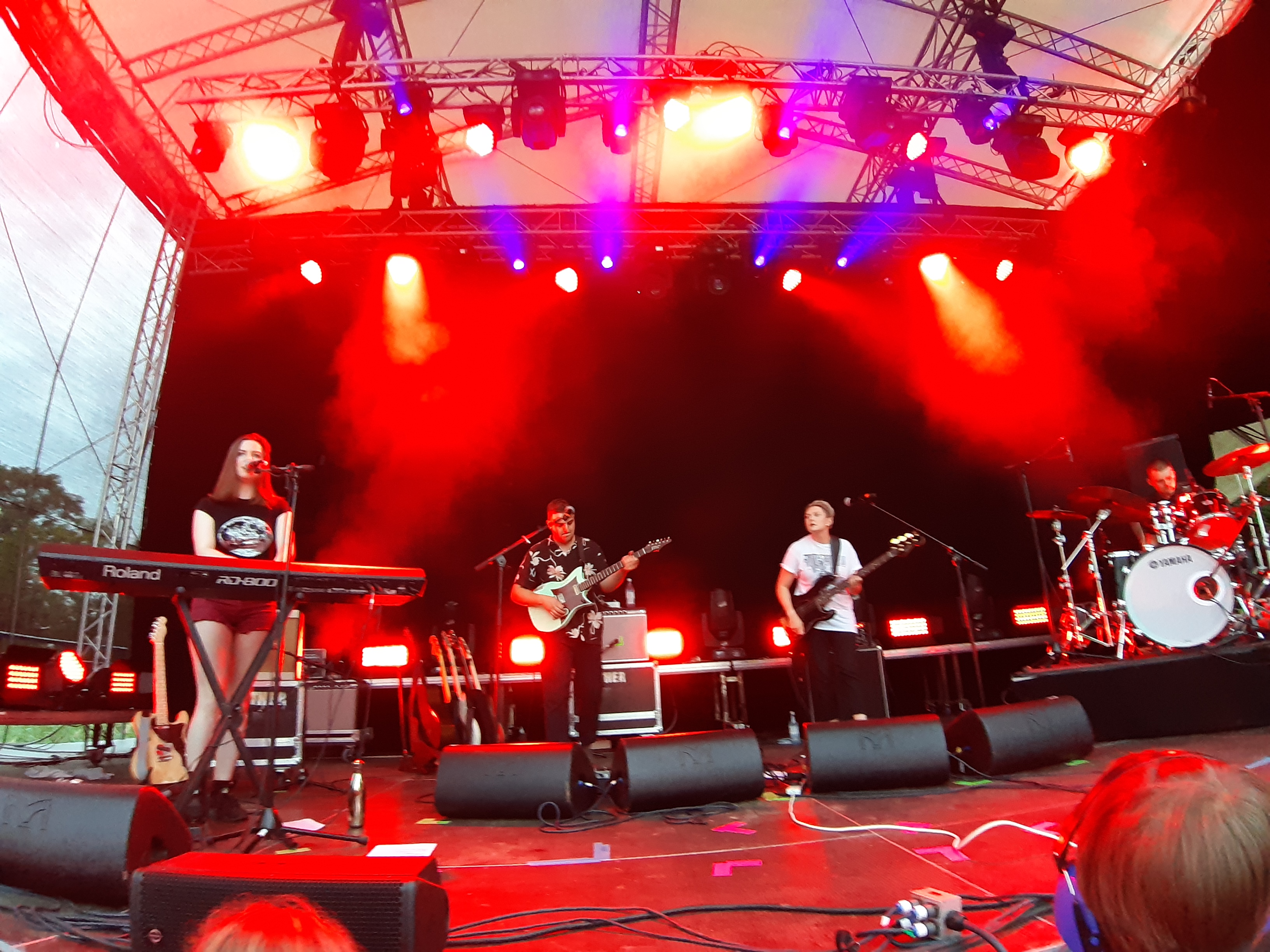
- Another Sky performing at Heimspiel Knyphausen in Eltville, 2019

Background information
- Origin: London, United Kingdom
- Genres: Post-rock; progressive rock; noise rock; indie rock; post-punk
- Years active: 2017–2025
- Labels: Fiction; Universal
- Members: Catrin Vincent; Max Doohan; Naomi Le Dune; Jack Gilbert
- Website: underneathanothersky.com

Another Sky were an English progressive rock band formed in London with their debut show in 2017 by Catrin Vincent, Max Doohan, Naomi Le Dune, and Jack Gilbert while they were all studying music. Vincent's unique singing voice is often mentioned in reviews, including for their released debut album, I Slept On the Floor, in 2020. They have followed their debut up with an EP, Music For Winter Vol. I, in 2021, and their second album, Beach Day, in 2024. The band announced their split in April 2025, with the intention of releasing an EP, titled “Mirror”, as their final release.

== History ==
Another Sky began forming in 2014 while the founding members of the band (Catrin Vincent, Jack Gilbert, Max Doohan, and Naomi Le Dune) were studying music at Goldsmiths, University of London.

In 2016, before naming their band, they wrote an unreleased song named "Another Sky" after Emily Dickinson's poem "There is another sky" and named their band after that song because it "made complete sense; when we make music together, we feel like we're somewhere different". Early performances include supporting experimental artist, Ghostpoet, alongside singer-songwriter, Rosie Lowe and playing the BBC Introducing stage at Bestival.

Their first public performance was at London's St Pancras Old Church in 2017. For that performance and later ones, they performed in total darkness and then sometimes backlit with custom built lights, in an attempt to remain anonymous. By early 2019, they had started performing more conventionally.

In 2019, their song "The Cracks" was included in the soundtrack of the video game FIFA 20.

In early 2021, they told Dork magazine that they are working on volume two for Music for Winter and a second full-length album. They had hinted it was possible it could have been released in 2021 (as of January 2025, only the full-length album, Beach Day, had been released), but also did not want to commit to a timeline.

In March 2022, they announced on their Twitter account that the band members agreed their second album was "finished and ready for mixing."

On 12 April 2023, they released two new songs, "Psychopath" and "Watching Basinski", their first since the Music for Winter, Vol. 1 EP. They also announced they have signed with Republic Records in the United States.

On 1 March 2024, they released their sophomore album: Beach Day. They had announced its release on 28 November 2023 along with releasing their fourth single related to the new album, a B-side, "Aimee Caught A Moth".

== Reception ==
They performed for NPR's Tiny Desk Concerts in December 2019 (with the video released in February 2020) and Bob Boilen wrote for NPR that there was "intensity and clear intention to the music.... But in the confines of an office, hearing Catrin Vincent's unique voice, raw and un-amplified, brought it to another level."

For The Independent, Roisin O’Connor gave their debut album, I Slept On the Floor, 4 out of 5 stars and said that Vincent's voice is "somehow genderless, alien – it's simply impossible not to listen to her". It also praised the album exploring "weighty issues such as mental health and toxic masculinity" and mentions there are both "crawling guitar riffs, juddering rhythms and ominous percussion" and "quieter tracks" as well, summing up the review saying the album is a "marvellous, and intense, debut".

In 2024, their second album, Beach Day, received positive reviews at release, with DIY magazine calling it a "fearless beauty".

== Members ==
- Catrin Vincent – vocals, piano, guitar (2017–2025)
- Jack Gilbert – guitar (2017–2025)
- Naomi Le Dune – bass guitar (2017–2025)
- Max Doohan – drums (2017–2025)

== Discography ==
=== Album ===
- I Slept on the Floor (2020)
- Beach Day (2024)

=== EPs ===
- Forget Yourself (2018)
- Life Was Coming in Through the Blinds (2019)
- Music for Winter Vol. I (2021)
- Mirror (2025)
