= Ghost Stories Live 2014 =

2014 live album by Coldplay

Live album by Coldplay
- Released: 24 November 2014
- Recorded: April–July 2014
- Venues: Ghost Stories Tour; (see track listing)
- Genres: R&B; electronic; synth-pop; ambient; alternative rock
- Length: 40:43
- Labels: Parlophone; Atlantic

Coldplay chronology
Ghost Stories (2014)	Ghost Stories Live 2014 (2014)	A Head Full of Dreams (2015)

Ghost Stories Live 2014 is the fourth live album by British rock band Coldplay. It was released on 24 November 2014 by Parlophone in the United Kingdom, featuring live recordings of their sixth studio album, Ghost Stories. A concert film made from their shows at Sony Pictures Studios in Culver City were included in the package as well.

Some of the footage was broadcast on NBC, but replacing three songs from its namesake album with hits like "Clocks", "Viva la Vida" and "Paradise". Direction for the film was handled by Paul Dugdale. Coldplay used 360-degree stage and relied on overhead panels in the venue for visuals. It received a Best Music Film nomination at the 57th Annual Grammy Awards.

== Recording ==
"Always in My Head", "Midnight" and "A Sky Full of Stars" were recorded on 1–2 July 2014 at the Royal Albert Hall, London. "Magic" and "True Love" were recorded on 19 June 2014 at Enmore Theatre, Sydney. "Ink" was recorded on 28 May 2014 at Paris Casino, Paris. "Another's Arms" was recorded on 5 May 2014 at Beacon Theatre, New York City. "Oceans" was recorded on 25 April at E-Werk, Cologne. "O" was recorded on 19 May 2014 at Royce Hall, Los Angeles.

== Commercial performance ==
Ghost Stories Live 2014 debuted at number 93 on the US Billboard 200, with 11,205 copies sold.

== Track listing ==
All tracks written by Guy Berryman, Jonny Buckland, Will Champion, and Chris Martin, except "A Sky Full of Stars" (co-written by Tim Bergling).

=== CD ===
Ghost Stories Live 2014
No.	Title	Length
1.	"Always in My Head" (Live at the Royal Albert Hall, London)	3:57
2.	"Magic" (Live at the Enmore Theatre, Sydney)	4:52
3.	"Ink" (Live at Le Casino de Paris, Paris)	4:09
4.	"True Love" (Live at the Enmore Theatre, Sydney)	4:20
5.	"Midnight" (Live at the Royal Albert Hall, London)	4:48
6.	"Another's Arms" (Live at the Beacon Theatre, New York City)	3:55
7.	"Oceans" (Live at E-Werk, Cologne)	4:28
8.	"A Sky Full of Stars" (Live at the Royal Albert Hall, London)	4:38
9.	"O" ("Fly On" – 0:00–3:50 / "O (Reprise)" – 3:51–5:36) (Live at Royce Hall, Los Angeles)	5:36
Total length:		40:43

Ghost Stories Live 2014 – Japanese edition
No.	Title	Length
10.	"Viva la Vida" (Live at Dome City Hall, Tokyo)	4:26
Total length:		45:09

Ghost Stories Live 2014 – iTunes version
No.	Title	Length
10.	"Always in My Head" (Alternative Live Take)	3:35
11.	"Oceans" (Alternative Live Take)	5:13
Total length:		49:31

=== Blu-ray or DVD ===
Ghost Stories Live 2014 – Recorded in Sony Pictures Studios, Culver City
No.	Title	Length
1.	"Always in My Head"
2.	"Magic"
3.	"Ink"
4.	"True Love"
5.	"Midnight"
6.	"Another's Arms"
7.	"Oceans"
8.	"A Sky Full of Stars"
9.	"O"
Total length:		41:57

Ghost Stories Live 2014 – Bonuses
No.	Title	Length
1.	"Midnight" (Music video)	5:10
2.	"Magic" (Music video, extended director's cut)	10:30
3.	"A Sky Full of Stars" (Music video)	4:14
4.	"True Love" (Music video)	4:21
5.	"Ink" (Live at Royal Albert Hall)	3:55
6.	"All Your Friends" (Music video)	3:43
7.	"Ghost Story" (Music video)	4:15
8.	"Always in My Head" (Artwork animation)	3:36
9.	"Always in My Head" (Alternate live take in Sony Studios)	3:34
10.	"Oceans" (Alternate live take in Sony Studios)	5:12
Total length:		48:30

== Personnel ==
Coldplay

- Jonny Buckland – electric guitar, keyboard, piano, backing vocals
- Guy Berryman – bass guitar, keyboard, laser harp
- Will Champion – drums, reactable, electric guitar, Ebow, vocals
- Chris Martin – lead vocals, acoustic guitar, piano, laser harp

Production

- Coldplay – producer
- Rik Simpson – producer, engineer
- Ted Jensen – mastering engineer

== Charts ==
=== Weekly charts ===
Weekly chart performance
Chart (2014–2015)	Peak position
Belgian Albums (Ultratop Flanders)	21
Belgian Albums (Ultratop Wallonia)	21
Brazilian Albums (ABPD)	4
Czech Albums (ČNS IFPI)	24
Croatian International Albums (HDU)	30
Dutch Albums (Album Top 100)	15
French Albums (SNEP)	165
Hungarian Albums (MAHASZ)	3
Irish Albums (IRMA)	28
Italian Albums (FIMI)	14
Japanese DVD Sales (Oricon)	130
Japanese Blu-Ray Sales (Oricon)	54
New Zealand Albums (RMNZ)	32
Slovak Albums (ČNS IFPI)	98
South Korean Albums (Gaon)	43
South Korean International Albums (Gaon)	5
Polish Albums (ZPAV)	43
Portuguese Albums (AFP)	8
UK Music Videos (Official Charts)	2
US Billboard 200	93

=== Year-end charts ===
Year-end chart performance
Chart (2014)	Position
Australian Music DVDs (ARIA)	5
Belgian Albums (Ultratop Wallonia)	186
Dutch Music DVDs (MegaCharts)	44
Hungarian Albums (MAHASZ)	11

Chart (2015)	Position
Australian Music DVDs (ARIA)	23
Belgian Albums (Ultratop Flanders)	113
Belgian Albums (Ultratop Wallonia)	140

== Certifications ==
Certifications
Region	Certification	Certified units/sales
France (SNEP) Album	Gold	50,000^{*}
Hungary (MAHASZ) Album	Platinum	2,000^{^}
United Kingdom (BPI) Video	Gold	25,000^{*}
^{*} Sales figures based on certification alone.^{^} Shipments figures based on certification alone.

== Release history ==
Release history and formats
Region	Date	Format	Label
Canada	24 November 2014	Digital download	Parlophone
France	24 November 2014	Digital download	Parlophone
Poland	24 November 2014	CD + DVD	Warner Music Poland
Poland	24 November 2014	CD + Blu-ray	Warner Music Poland
United Kingdom	24 November 2014	CD + DVD	Parlophone
United Kingdom	24 November 2014	CD + Blu-ray	Parlophone
United Kingdom	24 November 2014	Digital download	Parlophone
United States	24 November 2014	Digital download	Parlophone
Hong Kong	25 November 2014	Digital download	Parlophone
Mexico	25 November 2014	Digital download	Parlophone
Mexico	25 November 2014	Digital download	Parlophone
