= Ghost Stories Tour =

2014 concert tour by Coldplay

- Tour by Coldplay
- Promotional poster
- Location: Asia; Europe; North America; Oceania
- Associated album: Ghost Stories
- Start date: 25 April 2014
- End date: 8 December 2014
- No. of shows: 9
- Producer: Live Nation
- Attendance: 29,129
- Box office: $3.09 million (Note: $4.2 million in 2025 dollars.)
- Website: coldplay.com/tour

Coldplay concert chronology
- Mylo Xyloto Tour (2011–2012); Ghost Stories Tour (2014); A Head Full of Dreams Tour (2016–2017)

The Ghost Stories Tour was the sixth concert tour undertaken by British rock band Coldplay. It was announced on 17 April 2014 and staged to promote their sixth studio album, Ghost Stories. The performances marked a return to intimate venues after the stadium dates of the Mylo Xyloto Tour (2011–2012). The band played all songs from the standard version of the album, interspersed with some of their previous material. Concerts began at Cologne's E-Werk on 25 April 2014 and ended at Munich's BMW Welt on 6 December 2014, being noted for combining live and pre-recorded content for small settings.

Only three dates had an opening act, with SZA, London Grammar and AlunaGeorge supporting the Beacon Theatre, Royce Hall and Royal Albert Hall concerts, respectively. The tour was met with generally positive reviews from music critics, who praised the production and how Coldplay connected with the audience. Following its ending, the band released Ghost Stories Live 2014, which included music videos for "Always in My Head", "All Your Friends" and "Ghost Story" in its physical editions and was nominated for Best Music Film at the 57th Annual Grammy Awards. Overall, the concert run grossed $3.09 million from 29,129 tickets sold in 10 reported shows. (Note: Two concerts were held in New York City on 5 May 2014, the first was sold exclusively to Citibank card holders and not part of the tour, while the second had general public sales.)

== Background ==
During the Australian leg of the Mylo Xyloto Tour, lead singer Chris Martin told attendees at Brisbane's Suncorp Stadium they "wouldn't play another big show for a few years". After the release of "Midnight" and "Magic", the first two singles from Ghost Stories (2014), the band announced they would not be making a full tour for the album. Martin joked it was because they "couldn't afford it". Upcoming songs were later performed at the iTunes Festival and Coldplay held a one-off performance at Culver City's Sony Studios as well. On 17 April 2014, they announced a set of six intimate shows: three in Europe, two in the United States and one in Japan. A second date in England was arranged due to high demand. Months later, the band made tickets available for a performance in Australia, while a final show in Germany was announced to celebrate the upcoming release of Ghost Stories Live 2014.

== Opening acts ==
The tour featured three supporting acts and American singer SZA was the first, opening for Coldplay at the Beacon Theatre in New York City, on 5 May 2014. She mentioned being surprised about the invitation during an interview for Radio.com: "I can't even believe that was an opportunity or an option". English band London Grammar were recruited for the Royce Hall performance in Los Angeles on 19 May 2014. Their lead singer, Hannah Reid, mentioned that talking with Martin was the "first time [she was] given any really excellent advice" about protecting her voice before shows and how to handle tensions in a group. The Royal Albert Hall shows on 1 and 2 July 2014 were supported by AlunaGeorge, who played tracks from their debut album, Body Music, released in 2013. They also made several guest appearances during the Head Full of Dreams Tour (2016–2017).

== Concert synopsis ==
Guy Berryman using a laser harp while the band perform "Midnight" at Sony Studios, Culver City

The band used a different set list for every show and, unlike previous tours, did not divided them into sections. For the performance at Sony Studios (which was later released on Ghost Stories Live 2014), they played singles "Paradise" and "Clocks"; followed them with all standard edition tracks from the tour's namesake album in order; and finished the concert with "Viva la Vida" and "Fix You". The remaining shows contained between 15 and 20 songs, combining Coldplay's back catalogue with their current material. With exception of "Another's Arms" and "O", all tracks from the new album were played in every tour date.

Martin also mentioned they would be trying to incorporate a few rarities and fan favorites. During the song "Midnight", him and Berryman performed with a laser harp, while Will Champion used a reactable. The latter accompanied the singer in "O" by providing "subtle guitar licks", as the track was mostly played solo on the piano. At Royal Albert Hall, Coldplay had a circular stage said to be particularly close to the audience. For their show in Sydney, the band invited Kylie Minogue to perform "Can't Get You Out of My Head" and a cover of "Where the Wild Roses Grow" by Nick Cave. The last concert from the tour saw them play "Christmas Lights".

== Reception ==
According to Gigwise, tickets for the first Royal Albert Hall show went sold out within minutes of availability, which led the band to announce a second date. Similar demand was registered at Enmore Theatre. In total, they grossed $3,092,008 from 29,129 tickets sold in 10 reported shows. The tour also received positive reviews from music critics: Robert Altman from Consequence said Coldplay "are cohesive enough to rival the most skilled musicians in the industry", adding "what separates them from any studio performer is Martin's light stage banter and ability to connect with a multi-generational audience". The Hollywood Reporter's Roy Trakin stated they "turn heartbreak into transcendence, which is what all great artists do". Writing for The Guardian, Ian Gittins commented that while the band "always majored in empathy", the "sympathy vote being extended towards Martin tonight is palpable". Greg Inglis from DIY praised their confidence and emphasised it is often "overlooked" how versatile Coldplay are, as Champion was taking piano duties.

== Live album ==
Following the end of the tour, the band released Ghost Stories Live 2014, their fourth live album. It consisted of a CD with selected renditions of each song from the original studio album and a recording of their Sony Studios performance directed by Paul Dugdale. Martin described it as "a very special moment for our band" and added the film was "basically our original vision" for the project. Bonus content included the director's cut for "Magic" and three new music videos: "All Your Friends", a tribute to those who were part of the First World War; "Always in My Head", an animated version of the album cover; and "Ghost Story", which featured fading black and white shots of the band performing. Additionally, the second had an alternative concert take, along with "Oceans". Meanwhile, the Japanese CD edition included the tour's recording of "Viva la Vida". In 2014, the band received a Best Music Film nomination at the 57th Annual Grammy Awards for the project, losing it to 20 Feet from Stardom (2013).

== Set lists ==
This set list was taken from the 19 May 2014 concert in Los Angeles, United States. It does not represent all shows throughout the tour.

1. "Atlas"
2. "Charlie Brown"
3. "The Scientist"
4. "Don't Panic"
5. "A Whisper"
6. "Til Kingdom Come"
7. "Viva la Vida"
8. "Paradise"
9. "Always in My Head"
10. "Magic"
11. "Ink"
12. "True Love"
13. "Midnight"
14. "Another's Arms"
15. "Oceans"

Encore

16. "A Sky Full of Stars"
17. "Yellow"
18. "O"

== Tour dates ==
List of 2014 concerts
Date (2014)	City	Country	Venue
25 April	Cologne	Germany	E-Werk
5 May	New York City	United States	Beacon Theatre
19 May	Los Angeles	United States	Royce Hall
28 May	Paris	France	Casino de Paris
12 June	Tokyo	Japan	Tokyo Dome City Hall
19 June	Sydney	Australia	Enmore Theatre
1 July	London	England	Royal Albert Hall
2 July	London	England	Royal Albert Hall
6 December	Munich	Germany	BMW Welt

== Boxscores ==
List of reported boxscores
City	Venue	Attendance	Revenue
Cologne	E-Werk	2,000 / 2,000	$206,505
New York City	Beacon Theatre	5,512 / 5,512	$449,929
Munich	BMW Welt	1,511 / 1,511	$159,859
Total		9,023 / 9,023 (100%)	$816,293

== See also ==
- List of Coldplay live performances
- List of highest-grossing live music artists
