= Live 2014 =

Live 2014 may refer to:

- Ghost Stories Live 2014, album by Coldplay
- Live 2014, album by Franz Ferdinand
- Vamps Live 2014, album by The Vamps (British band)
- Animelo Summer Live 2014, by Nana Mizuki
