= Valeria Gutiérrez =

Miss Ecuador International 2022

- Born: Valeria Gutiérrez Pinto; August 13, 1999 (age 27); Guayaquil, Ecuador
- Education: University of California, Los Angeles
- Occupations: Beauty pageant titleholder; actress; model; television personality
- Height: 1.73 m (5 ft 8 in)
- Beauty pageant titleholder
- Title: Miss International Ecuador 2022
- Hair color: Brown
- Eye color: Brown
- Major competitions: Miss Ecuador 2021 (Winner – Miss International Ecuador 2022); Miss International 2022 (Unplaced) (Miss Photogenic)

Valeria Gutiérrez Pinto (born August 13, 1999) is an Ecuadorian actress, model and beauty pageant titleholder who was crowned Miss International Ecuador 2022. She represented Ecuador at the Miss International 2022 pageant.

== Early life and education ==
Gutiérrez was born and grew up in Guayaquil, Ecuador to a Brazilian father and Ecuadorian mother, Gaby Gutiérrez. She is the oldest of two siblings. At nine years old, she moved to U.S with her family. She currently lives in Miami. In 2015 studied Professional Broadcast Presenting in the Aspire TV Presenter Training in London, England and continued her study of bachelor's degree Social Communication at the University of California, Los Angeles. In 2019 participated in Enamorándonos USA, where she had a relationship with Renier Izquierdo until the beginning of the COVID-19 pandemic, the reality was aired on Univision. She is fluent in English and Portuguese.

== Pageantry ==
=== Miss Ecuador 2021 ===
Gutiérrez's, began her pageantry career in 2021. On June 28, 2021, she was announced as one of the 20 official contestant for Miss Ecuador 2021. She was select to represent the Community Ecuadorian in USA in the national beauty contest. On September 11, 2021, competed at the Malecón Eloy Alfaro in Quevedo. During the final, Gutiérrez advanced into the Top ten and then into the Top six. After reaching the Top six, she placed as the 1st Runner-up. Where she was crowned as the winner of Miss International Ecuador 2022 by the predecessor NLU Ecuador 2020, Saskya Sacasa.

=== Miss International 2022 ===
As the winner of Miss International Ecuador 2022, Gutiérrez represented Ecuador at the 60th edition of Miss International 2022 pageant, held at Tokyo Dome City Hall, Tokyo, Japan On December 13, 2022. Where she won Miss Photogenic Award during the final. Gutiérrez's the first Ecuadorian to win Miss Photogenic Award for Ecuador.

Awards and achievements
Preceded by Saskya Sacasa	Miss Ecuador 1st Runner-Up; 2021	Succeeded by Georgette Kalil
Preceded by Alegria Tobar	Miss International Ecuador; 2022	Succeeded by Georgette Kalil
