= Ghost Stories (Coldplay album) =

- Standard edition cover

Studio album by Coldplay
- Released: 19 May 2014
- Recorded: April–November 2013
- Studios: The Bakery (London); The Beehive (London)
- Genres: Electronica; synth-pop; pop rock; ambient; folktronica
- Length: 42:37
- Labels: Parlophone; Atlantic
- Producers: Coldplay; Paul Epworth; Dan Green; Rik Simpson; Madeon; Avicii; Timbaland; Jon Hopkins

Coldplay chronology
Live 2012 (2012)	Ghost Stories (2014)	Ghost Stories Live 2014 (2014)

Singles from Ghost Stories
- 1. "Magic" Released: 3 March 2014; 2. "A Sky Full of Stars" Released: 2 May 2014; 3. "True Love" Released: 14 August 2014; 4. "Ink" Released: 13 October 2014

Ghost Stories is the sixth studio album by the British rock band Coldplay. It was released on 19 May 2014 by Parlophone in the United Kingdom and Atlantic in the United States. Co-produced by the group along with Paul Epworth and Mylo Xyloto collaborators Dan Green and Rik Simpson, it was their first album to be distributed by Atlantic in North America, as Coldplay were transferred from Capitol after Universal Music purchased EMI in 2012, a transaction which required the sale of Parlophone to Warner Music.

The album was recorded by the band throughout 2013 at the band's purpose-built home studios in London, England, and in Los Angeles. It features guest producers Avicii, Timbaland and Madeon, and the band's frequent collaborator Jon Hopkins. It was promoted by the band with an accompanying prime time TV special, a visual album, and a special six-date promotional tour of the album, as well as various appearances on television and radio. The album was promoted by five singles: "Magic", the lead single, released in March; “Midnight”, released in April as a promotional single for Record Store Day; "A Sky Full of Stars", released in May; "True Love", released in August; and "Ink", released in October. The album was nominated for Best Pop Vocal Album at the 57th Grammy Awards and named Top Rock Album at the 2015 Billboard Music Awards.

The album received generally positive reviews, with many critics praising the band's return to the more somber and melancholy style of their earlier music, though some found the album repetitive and lacking direction. Several media outlets reported that Chris Martin has said the album was inspired by his divorce from Gwyneth Paltrow in 2014.

== Background ==
In 2011, Coldplay released their fifth studio album, Mylo Xyloto. Originally conceived by the band as a "stripped-down, more acoustic collection", the album became one of Coldplay's most experimental and pop-oriented records to date; it was described as "luxuriously colourful" where "the choruses are bigger, the textures grander [and] the optimism more optimistic." Produced by Markus Dravs, Brian Eno, Rik Simpson and Dan Green, the album peaked at number one on 18 national album charts and was certified Platinum in 16 countries. Mylo Xyloto had also sold 8 million copies within the first year of release. Coldplay's 2011 single, "Paradise", became the band's second UK number-one single after 2008's "Viva la Vida". Coldplay's subsequent world tour in promotion of Mylo Xyloto visited North America, Europe, Australia and Africa, raising $99.7 million in revenue.

Going into the creative process for their sixth studio album, the band wanted to return to the "stripped-down, more acoustic collection" they had stated their fifth album would be, returning to the original idea of an acoustic-orientated album, with less of the production and sound that made Mylo Xyloto. At the 2013 Brit Awards, drummer Will Champion spoke to Jo Whiley of BBC Radio 2 fame, saying in response to a question about Coldplay's sixth album being more stripped-back: "Yeah, that might be nice, actually. There's only so far you can go without becoming pompous and a bit overblown, so we'll tread that line very carefully. Reset. Recalibrate."

== Composition ==
Ghost Stories has been described as featuring electronica and synth-pop throughout. It is a spiritually driven album that revolves around two major themes mentioned by lead singer Chris Martin. The album explores the idea of past actions, and the effects they can have on your future and one's capacity for unconditional love. To him, Ghost Stories represents "a journey learning about unconditional love" (as said in the televised Making Ghost Stories with Fearne Cotton).

The idea of Ghost Stories, for me, was "how do you let the things that happen to you in the past – your ghosts – how do you let them affect your present and your future?" Because there was a time when I was feeling like they were going to drag me down and ruin my life, and the lives of those around me. I was very lucky to meet a very good sufi teacher who started to introduce the idea of "if you sit with your experiences and the things you've been through, they alchemize." At the time he said that, I didn't really know what that meant, but I trusted that it would work, and the more that I was learning about that, the more music just started flowing through.

— Chris Martin to Zane Lowe

== Recording ==
The creative process and recording sessions for the band's sixth studio album took place between 2013 and early 2014, at their purpose-built studios The Bakery and The Beehive in North London, England, then in Los Angeles for the final process. The creation of the album actually started at Guy Berryman's house in London in early 2013 where he had settled a little studio where everyone gathered to jam and try some new music during a break after the band's big tour for Mylo Xyloto. The band took a different approach for their sixth studio album in contrast to their previous studio albums. Lead singer Chris Martin invited the band to contribute original songwriting material for the album, as opposed to building songs off Martin's ideas as they had done during previous recording sessions. For example, "Magic" was built off a bass riff originally conceived by bassist Guy Berryman in the studio.

For a long, long time I've been begging the band, "Please could someone else start a song!" I've been given that gift from the universe, or from God or whatever you want to believe in that ideas for songs get sent through wherever they get sent from, and then I take them to the rest of the band and then we layer it up and that's how we do it. I was so grateful. It made me so happy and that was kind of a sample of the album as a whole, "We'll help each other out here". There were lots of songs but that was the first point where I thought, "Everyone is invested in this, everyone knows what we're trying to do; go a bit more personal".

— Chris Martin

According to producer Paul Epworth, the band recorded the album mostly on their own, while his direction helped in "trying to avoid going for any of their obvious clichés". He also added his main influence was that Ghost Stories needed to be recorded solely with electronic drums.

== Packaging ==
An example of Mila Fürstová's work, which are inspired by mythology, a central theme also depicted in the artwork for Ghost Stories. (Pictured: "Other Skies I" by Fürstová, 2011)

The album artwork for Ghost Stories was etched by British-based Czech etching artist Mila Fürstová. The medieval art-driven artwork, measuring 100 by 100 cm, features a pair of angel wings imposed onto a painting of an ocean under a sky at night. The angel wings resemble a broken heart, representing the album's somber theme of melancholic breakups. The wings themselves also feature cryptic imagery of medieval-style drawings of fairly contemporary objects and concepts. The images include a couple in love, a man facing a mirror, a flight of white doves, a circular maze, a girl by candlelight, a window looking out onto an incoming tornado and a garden plant with a ladder, amongst other imagery depicted in the artwork. A larger, digital version of the artwork is available on Coldplay's official website, with the ability to zoom into the artwork with a screen magnifier.

Fürstová had etched the artworks for all of the releases in the Ghost Stories album cycle, including the artwork for singles "Magic" and "Midnight", which all use the same motif of a scenario taking place in a larger body. Fürstová, whose work has been described as "dazzling images [that] are both contemporary and personal, searching in the surreality of dreams, tales and fables that can map the framework of our consciousness", and has won numerous awards, including the Royal College of Art Society Award in 2001 and becoming the youngest academician at the Royal West of England Academy in 2009, was invited by Coldplay to etch artwork for their new album in January 2013. She described the collaboration between her and the band as "a most inspiring journey and a truly humbling experience to cooperate with such talented people".

There had been plans for an exhibition of Fürstová's Ghost Stories artworks in the Autumn of 2014 in central London. 25 original etchings and 100 high-quality digital prints of the artwork, all hand-signed by Fürstová, had also set to go on sale on 19 May 2014, the same day Ghost Stories released in the United Kingdom and the United States.

== Promotion ==
Coldplay performing at the televised 2014 iTunes Festival at SXSW where four Ghost Stories tracks were premiered live.

Coldplay performed on the opening night of the televised 2014 iTunes Festival at SXSW on 11 March 2014 at the Moody Theater in Austin, Texas. In addition to performing "Magic" and "Midnight", the band performed "Always in My Head" and "Another's Arms"; the first live performances of the four songs. The band also performed "Magic" in a pre-recorded segment of Sport Relief 2014, which aired on BBC One on 21 March 2014.

In April 2014, Coldplay announced an international scavenger hunt for sheets containing lyrics to the nine songs on the album. The notes, handwritten by Martin, were placed in ghost story books in libraries around the world, with the band tweeting clues leading to their locations. One of the hidden envelopes also contained a special Golden Ticket, allowing its finder and their guest to go to London for the Coldplay concert at the Royal Albert Hall in July. The lyric sheets were found in libraries in Mexico City, Singapore, Helsinki, Barcelona, Dartford, New York City, Tauranga, Dublin and Johannesburg.

A TV special titled Coldplay: Ghost Stories was filmed 21–23 March 2014 by the Grammy-nominated director Paul Dugdale (Adele, The Rolling Stones) on a custom-built stage in a Sony Pictures movie soundstage in Los Angeles. Coldplay performed material from the album in its entirety for the first time. The show, which included cinematic vignettes and 360-degree projections, was attended by an audience of 800 fans and press, and was broadcast in prime time in several countries in May and June 2014. The special was then sold on DVD and Blu-ray in November 2014. Additional footage was shot at Paradise Cove in Malibu, California, and at Woollett Aquatics Center in Irvine, California, for the film. Chris Martin said, "The Ghost Stories show at Sony Studios was a very special moment for our band ... This film is basically our original vision for the Ghost Stories album." Coldplay was also the musical act for 3 May airing of NBC late-night sketch comedy show Saturday Night Live and performed "Magic" and "A Sky Full of Stars". It was the band's fifth appearance on the show.

On 12 May 2014, seven days before its release date, the album became available to stream in full via iTunes, accompanied by an animated video revolving around Fürstová's album artwork, but the band refused to allow Spotify, Beats Music, Deezer, and Rdio to stream the album until 22 September 2014, which they had previously done on their last album, Mylo Xyloto.

=== Singles ===
A music video for "Midnight", the fifth track on the album, was released as a teaser for the band's sixth studio album on 25 February 2014. Ghost Stories was officially unveiled by Coldplay and Parlophone a week later on 3 March 2014, along with its artwork and track listing. "Magic" was released on the same day, being the album's lead single. It was made available to download through iTunes and Amazon.com by pre-ordering the album, with the track working as an "instant-grat" download. Following the release of the song, it charted on 25 national record charts, peaking within the top ten on 18 of them. "Midnight" was then released as a promotional single by Parlophone on 17 April 2014 with a one-sided 7-inch vinyl for Record Store Day, which was limited to 3000 copies.

"A Sky Full of Stars" was released digitally as the second official single on 2 May 2014. Within 24 hours from its iTunes release, the track had sold 121,690 units worldwide, peaking at number one in 86 countries on the iTunes Store Charts. The song reached number ten on the Billboard Hot 100, making it their third top 10 hit and first since "Viva la Vida" in 2008. It also became their first number-one single on the Billboard Hot Rock Songs chart. On 4 August 2014, the band announced that "True Love" would be the third effort from the album. A music video directed by Jonas Åkerlund was released on 22 August 2014, Chris Martin and Jessica Lucas stars as lovers in it.

On 13 October 2014, "Ink" was served as the fourth and final single to Italian contemporary hit radio. On 18 November, the track was sent to modern rock stations in the United States. The music video was written, directed and animated by Blind, which worked with a company by the name "Interlude" to create over 300 possible journeys.

A video for "All Your Friends" was released on 7 November 2014 for the commemoration of the first World War. Although the track is not available on the standard edition of Ghost Stories, it is available on the A Sky Full of Stars EP worldwide – except for the United States where it is included on the deluxe version of Ghost Stories sold by Target. An official music video for "Ghost Story" was released as a part of the Ghost Stories Live 2014 DVD on 24 November 2014; it was uploaded on the band's official YouTube channel on 9 March 2015. The video was shot in black and white, and shows the band performing the song during their Ghost Stories Tour. Similar to "All Your Friends", the song is available on the A Sky Full of Stars EP and on the Target deluxe edition of the album is the U.S.

== Critical reception ==
=== Reviews ===
Professional ratings
Aggregate scores
Source	Rating
AnyDecentMusic?	6.1/10
Metacritic	61/100
Review scores
Source	Rating
AllMusic	4/5 stars
The A.V. Club	B−
The Daily Telegraph	3/5 stars
Entertainment Weekly	B
The Guardian	3/5 stars
The Independent	3/5 stars
NME	7/10
Pitchfork	4.4/10
Rolling Stone	3.5/5 stars
Spin	7/10

Ghost Stories received generally positive reviews. At Metacritic, which assigns a normalized rating out of 100 to reviews from mainstream critics, the album received an average score of 61, based on 31 reviews, which indicates "generally favorable reviews". Jason Lipshutz of Billboard wrote the magazine's track-by-track review of the album, praising it as the band's "most listenable album in years" and describing it as "an evocative concoction of sullen phrases, sparse arrangements and powerful themes." Kyle Anderson of Entertainment Weekly commented that Ghost Stories "will likely be remembered as a transitional album" and noted that "while being solid, it feels like a prequel to something better". Larry Fitzmaurice of Pitchfork wrote that the album is a "subdued work that finds Chris Martin and his band crisply moping through mid-tempo soundscapes and fuzzy electronic touches that have the visceral impact of a down comforter tumbling down a flight of stairs." Nick Hasted of The Independent wrote that Martin "accepts his loss too meekly to approach the anguish of a great break-up album", but concluded that the band's "step away from grand platitudes is still one in the right direction". Stephanie Benson of Spin wrote that "its deep sea of synth-encrusted pop glistens under a halo of angelic ambient touches and Martin’s ever-rosy perspective."

Jerry Shriver of USA Today felt that "within the realm of memorable breakup albums", Ghost Stories lacked "the confessional gut-punch of Dylan's Blood on the Tracks, the acrimony of Richard and Linda Thompson's Shoot Out the Lights and the irresistible sonic appeal of Fleetwood Mac's Rumours", ultimately describing it as "not even a particularly memorable Coldplay album". While noting that Ghost Stories "should be applauded for scaling back the gaudy excesses of their previous albums", Consequence of Sound's Josh Terry opined that its songs "suffer from a lack of direction" and "could use the vitality that launched them to the top in the first place". Mikael Wood of the Los Angeles Times wrote, "The nine songs on Ghost Stories hum gently, cultivating an effective sense of intimacy. As always, there's a lot going on in the music, sculpted by the band along with various collaborators." He added, "Coldplay's new album, 'Ghost Stories,' finds the British band setting aside its trademark grandiosity." Paste's Mack Hayden challenged tentative listeners to "pretend it's okay to appreciate Coldplay in the same vein most of us would openly admit to appreciating songs like 'Forever Young' by Alphaville or 'If You Leave' by Orchestral Manoeuvres in the Dark... songs whose main purpose is to make us feel good about the more nostalgic, sappy and John-Hughes-movie parts of human nature." Hayden argued that those "willing to play" would find Ghost Stories to be "one of the best records Coldplay has ever released", and the sound of "a band getting back to their roots after taking the majority of the world by storm".

=== Rankings ===
List of critic rankings
Publication	Description	Result	Ref.
AbsolutePunk	Top Albums of 2014	21	
AllMusic	Year in Review – Favorite Rock Albums 2014	Placed	
Gaffa (Denmark)	Album of the Year 2014 – Editor's Choice	18	
NBHAP	Emily Schennach's Favourite Albums of 2014	5	
Panorama	The 15 Best Albums of 2014	6	
Rolling Stone	50 Best Albums of 2014	48	
Stereogum	The 50 Best Albums of 2014 So Far	35	
The Telegraph	Best 50 Albums of 2014	41	
Radio X	The 25 Best Albums of 2014	12	(Note: Despite ranking albums from 2014, Radio X's list was published in 2023.)
Yahoo!	Paul Grein's Best Albums of 2014	4	

== Accolades ==
List of awards and nominations
Year	Ceremony	Category	Result	Ref.
2014	UK Music Video Awards	Best Live Coverage	Nominated	
2015	Billboard Music Awards	Top Rock Album	Won	
2015	Broadcast Awards	Best Music Programme	Won	
2015	Grammy Awards	Best Pop Vocal Album	Nominated	
2015	Hungarian Music Awards	Foreign Modern Pop/Rock Album of the Year	Nominated	
2015	People's Choice Awards	Favorite Album	Nominated	
2015	Swiss Music Awards	Best International Album	Won	
2015	TEC Awards	Record Production / Album	Nominated	

== Commercial performance ==
Ghost Stories reached number one in 30 countries, selling over 1 million copies in its first week worldwide. It led the charts in more than 100 territories on iTunes. Coldplay had the best-selling album of the year by a group as a result, moving 3.7 million units. In the United Kingdom, they shifted 168,048 copies, securing their sixth chart-topper and the second-largest debut of 2014. Ghost Stories later achieved the highest sales of the first semester in Britain, at over 375,000 units. In the United States, it opened with 382,665 copies, earning Coldplay their fourth number-one on the Billboard 200, where it stayed for two consecutive weeks. The album surpassed 853,500 units based on pure sales as of November 2015. On the Canadian Albums chart, Ghost Stories shifted 49,000 copies in a week, finishing the year at 117,000. In South Korea, all tracks managed to enter the International Gaon Chart simultaneously. In Japan, the album debuted at number seven with 20,562 physical copies sold.

== Track listing ==
All tracks are written by Coldplay, with co-production from Paul Epworth, Dan Green and Rik Simpson, except where noted.

Ghost Stories – standard edition track listing
No.	Title	Writer(s)	Producer(s)	Length
1.	"Always in My Head"			3:36
2.	"Magic"			4:45
3.	"Ink"			3:48
4.	"True Love"			4:06
5.	"Midnight"	Coldplay; Jon Hopkins	Coldplay; Epworth; Green; Simpson; Hopkins^{[a]}	4:54
6.	"Another's Arms"			3:54
7.	"Oceans"			5:21
8.	"A Sky Full of Stars"	Coldplay; Tim Bergling	Coldplay; Epworth; Green; Simpson; Avicii^{[a]}	4:28
9.	"O"			7:46
Total length:				42:47

Ghost Stories – Japanese edition bonus track
No.	Title	Writer(s)	Producer(s)	Length
10.	"Midnight" (Jon Hopkins remix)	Coldplay; Hopkins	Coldplay; Epworth; Green; Simpson; Hopkins	10:05
Total length:				52:42

Ghost Stories – Target edition bonus tracks
No.	Title	Producer(s)	Length
10.	"All Your Friends"	Coldplay; Green; Simpson	3:31
11.	"Ghost Story"	Coldplay; Green; Simpson	4:17
12.	"O (Reprise)"	Coldplay; Epworth; Green	1:37
Total length:			50:53

Notes

- ^{^a} Signifies an additional producer.
- "O" contains the hidden track "Fly On", which ends at 3:53.
- "O" contains 2 minutes and 24 seconds of silence until beginning at 6:18 on physical editions. This is omitted on the Target and Spotify versions, reducing the length to 5:23.

Sample credits

- "Midnight" contains a sample of "The Fourth State II" (written by Jon Hopkins).
- "Another's Arms" contains a sample of "Silver Chord" (written by Jane Weaver).

== Personnel ==
Credits are adapted from Ghost Stories liner notes.

Coldplay

- Chris Martin – lead vocals, acoustic guitar, keyboards
- Guy Berryman – bass guitar, keyboards
- Jonny Buckland – electric guitar, slide guitar, keyboards
- Will Champion – drum pad, percussion, reactable, backing vocals, electric guitar on "O"
- Phil Harvey

Additional musicians

- Timbaland – extra drums (track 4)
- Apple Martin – additional vocals (track 9)
- Moses Martin – additional vocals (track 9)
- Mabel Krichefski – additional vocals (track 9)
- John Metcalfe – strings arrangement, conductor
- Davide Rossi – individual arrangement and strings (track 4)
- Tim Bergling (Avicii) – piano (track 8)

Design

- Mila Fürstová – artwork
- Tappin Gofton – design, art direction
- Phil Harvey – photography

Technical

- Paul Epworth – production
- Coldplay – production
- Dan Green – production, mixing (track 7)
- Rik Simpson – production, mixing (track 7)
- Jon Hopkins – co-production (track 5), "extra magic" [sic]
- Tim Bergling – co-production (track 8)
- Mark "Spike" Stent – mixing (track 1–6, 8, 9)
- Geoff Swan – assistant mixing (track 1–6, 8, 9)
- Mike Dean – "extra magic" (track 6)
- Madeon – "extra magic" (track 1, 9)
- Ted Jensen – mastering
- Olga FitzRoy – engineering
- Matt Wiggins – engineering
- Jaime Sickora – engineering
- Chris Owens – engineering
- Joe Visciano – engineering
- Tom Bailey – additional studio assistance
- Fiona Cruickshank – additional studio assistance
- Nicolas Essig – additional studio assistance
- Jeff Gartenbaum – additional studio assistance
- Christian Green – additional studio assistance
- Joseph Hartwell Jones – additional studio assistance
- Pablo Hernandez – additional studio assistance
- Neil Lambert – additional studio assistance
- Matt McGinn – additional studio assistance
- Adam Miller – additional studio assistance
- Roxy Pope – additional studio assistance
- John Prestage – additional studio assistance
- Bill Rahko – additional studio assistance
- Kyle Stevens – additional studio assistance

== Charts ==
=== Weekly charts ===
Weekly chart performance
Chart (2014–2017)	Peak position
Argentine Albums (CAPIF)	1
Australian Albums (ARIA)	1
Austrian Albums (Ö3 Austria)	2
Belgian Albums (Ultratop Flanders)	1
Belgian Albums (Ultratop Wallonia)	1
Brazilian Albums (ABPD)	4
Canadian Albums (Billboard)	1
Croatian International Albums (HDU)	1
Czech Albums (ČNS IFPI)	1
Danish Albums (Hitlisten)	1
Dutch Albums (Album Top 100)	2
Finnish Albums (Suomen virallinen lista)	1
French Albums (SNEP)	1
German Albums (Offizielle Top 100)	1
Greek Albums (IFPI)	6
Hungarian Albums (MAHASZ)	1
Indian Albums (IMI)	5
Irish Albums (IRMA)	1
Italian Albums (FIMI)	1
Japanese Albums (Oricon)	7
Japanese Top Albums Sales (Billboard Japan)	10
Mexican Albums (Top 100 Mexico)	3
New Zealand Albums (RMNZ)	1
Norwegian Albums (VG-lista)	1
Polish Albums (ZPAV)	1
Portuguese Albums (AFP)	1
Scottish Albums (Official Charts)	1
Slovak Albums (ČNS IFPI)	26
Spanish Albums (Promusicae)	1
South African Albums (RiSA)	7
South Korean Albums (Gaon)	6
South Korean International Albums (Gaon)	1
Swedish Albums (Sverigetopplistan)	1
Swiss Albums (Schweizer Hitparade)	1
Taiwanese Albums (Five Music)	1
UK Albums (Official Charts)	1
US Billboard 200	1
US Top Rock & Alternative Albums (Billboard)	1

=== Monthly charts ===
Monthly chart performance
Chart (2014)	Peak position
Argentine Albums (CAPIF)	3
Japanese Albums (Oricon)	13
South Korean Albums (Gaon)	23
South Korean International Albums (Gaon)	5
Uruguayan Albums (CUD)	3

=== Year-end charts ===
Year-end chart performance
Chart (2014)	Position
Australian Albums (ARIA)	5
Austrian Albums (Ö3 Austria)	19
Belgian Albums (Ultratop Flanders)	2
Belgian Albums (Ultratop Wallonia)	6
Canadian Albums (Billboard)	9
Danish Albums (Hitlisten)	12
Dutch Albums (Album Top 100)	2
French Albums (SNEP)	13
German Albums (Offizielle Top 100)	13
Hungarian Albums (MAHASZ)	8
Irish Albums (IRMA)	15
Italian Albums (FIMI)	8
Japanese Albums (Oricon)	71
Mexican Albums (AMPROFON)	27
New Zealand Albums (RMNZ)	9
Polish Albums (ZPAV)	10
Singaporean Albums (IFPI)	5
South Korean International Albums (Gaon)	22
Spanish Albums (Promusicae)	17
Swedish Albums (Sverigetopplistan)	44
Swiss Albums (Schweizer Hitparade)	3
UK Albums (OCC)	5
US Alternative Albums (Billboard)	3
US Billboard 200	14
US Billboard Digital Albums	8
US Billboard Rock Albums	3
Worldwide Albums (IFPI)	4

Chart (2015)	Position
Belgian Albums (Ultratop Flanders)	61
Belgian Albums (Ultratop Wallonia)	103
Dutch Albums (Album Top 100)	62
French Albums (SNEP)	71
Italian Albums (FIMI)	90
South Korean International Albums (Gaon)	96
Spanish Albums (Promusicae)	92
Swedish Albums (Sverigetopplistan)	71
Swiss Albums (Schweizer Hitparade)	81
UK Albums (OCC)	97
US Billboard Rock Albums	58

Chart (2017)	Position
South Korean International Albums (Gaon)	88

=== Decade-end charts ===
Decade-end chart performance
Chart (2010–2019)	Position
Australian Albums (ARIA)	97
Dutch Albums (Album Top 100)	71
UK Albums (OCC)	94

== Certifications and sales ==
Certifications and sales
Region	Certification	Certified units/sales
Argentina (CAPIF)	Gold	20,000^{^}
Australia (ARIA)	4× Platinum	280,000^{‡}
Austria (IFPI Austria)	Platinum	15,000^{*}
Belgium (BRMA)	Platinum	30,000^{*}
Canada (Music Canada)	2× Platinum	160,000^{‡}
Denmark (IFPI Danmark)	2× Platinum	40,000^{‡}
France (SNEP)	3× Platinum	300,000^{*}
Germany (BVMI)	3× Gold	300,000^{‡}
Hungary (MAHASZ)	2× Platinum	4,000^{^}
Italy (FIMI)	3× Platinum	150,000^{‡}
Japan	—	67,737 (Note: Japanese physical sales for Ghost Stories as of January 2015.)
Mexico (AMPROFON)	Gold	30,000^{^}
Netherlands (NVPI)	Platinum	50,000^{^}
New Zealand (RMNZ)	2× Platinum	30,000^{‡}
Poland (ZPAV)	2× Platinum	40,000^{‡}
Portugal (AFP)	Gold	7,500^{^}
Singapore (RIAS)	Platinum	10,000^{*}
South Korea	—	6,911 (Note: South Korean year-end physical sales for Ghost Stories in 2014, 2015 and 2017.)
Spain (Promusicae)	Gold	20,000^{^}
Switzerland (IFPI Switzerland)	2× Platinum	40,000^{^}
United Kingdom (BPI)	2× Platinum	733,000 (Note: British total sales for Ghost Stories as of October 2021.)
United States (RIAA)	2× Platinum	2,000,000^{‡}
Summaries
Europe (IFPI)	Platinum	1,000,000^{*}
^{*} Sales figures based on certification alone.^{^} Shipments figures based on certification alone.^{‡} Sales+streaming figures based on certification alone.

== Release history ==
Release history and formats
Region	Date	Format	Version	Label	Ref.
Various	19 May 2014	CD · LP · digital download	Standard	Parlophone · Atlantic · Warner Music	
United States	19 May 2014	CD	Target	Parlophone · Atlantic · Warner Music	
Brazil	20 May 2014	Digital download	Standard	Parlophone · Atlantic · Warner Music	
Italy	20 May 2014	Digital download	Standard	Parlophone · Atlantic · Warner Music	
Spain	20 May 2014	Digital download	Standard	Parlophone · Atlantic · Warner Music	
Japan	21 May 2014	Digital download	Standard	Parlophone · Atlantic · Warner Music	
United States	19 August 2014	Streaming	Beats Music	Parlophone · Atlantic · Warner Music	
Various	22 September 2014	Streaming	Standard	Parlophone · Atlantic · Warner Music	

== See also ==
- 2014 in British music
- List of best-selling albums of 2014
- List of best-selling albums of the 2010s in the United Kingdom
- List of best-selling albums of 2014 in Ireland
- List of number-one albums in Argentina
- List of number-one albums in Norway
- List of Billboard 200 number-one albums of 2014
- List of number-one albums of 2014 (Australia)
- List of number-one albums of 2014 (Belgium)
- List of number-one albums of 2014 (Canada)
- List of number-one albums of 2014 (Finland)
- List of number-one albums of 2014 (Ireland)
- List of number-one albums of 2014 (Poland)
- List of number-one albums of 2014 (Portugal)
- List of number-one albums of 2014 (Spain)
- List of number-one hits of 2014 (France)
- List of number-one hits of 2014 (Germany)
- List of number-one hits of 2014 (Italy)
- List of number-one hits of 2014 (Sweden)
- List of number-one hits of 2014 (Switzerland)
- List of number-one albums of the 2010s (Czech Republic)
- List of number-one albums from the 2010s (Denmark)
- List of number-one albums from the 2010s (New Zealand)
- List of UK Albums Chart number ones of the 2010s
