= List of best-selling singles and albums of 2014 in Ireland =

This is a list of the best selling singles, albums and as according to IRMA. Further listings can be found here.

== Top-selling singles ==
1. Pharrell Williams – "Happy"
2. John Legend – "All of Me"
3. Hozier – "Take Me to Church"
4. Band Aid 30 – "Do They Know It's Christmas?"
5. Clean Bandit featuring Jess Glynne – "Rather Be"
6. Ed Sheeran – "Thinking Out Loud"
7. Pitbull featuring Kesha – "Timber"
8. Meghan Trainor – "All About That Bass"
9. Sam Smith – "Stay With Me"
10. Ella Henderson – "Ghost"

== Top-selling albums* ==
1. X – Ed Sheeran
2. Hozier – Hozier
3. In the Lonely Hour – Sam Smith
4. Four – One Direction
5. 1989 – Taylor Swift
6. Halcyon Days – Ellie Goulding
7. In a Perfect World – Kodaline
8. No Sound Without Silence – The Script
9. Ghost Stories – Coldplay
10. Tribal – Imelda May

Notes:

- *Compilation albums are not included.
