= Miss Ecuador 2022 =

72nd Miss Ecuador pageant

- Date: September 3, 2022
- Presenters: Roberto Rodríguez; Claudia Schiess
- Entertainment: Dayanara
- Venue: Malecón Eloy Alfaro, Quevedo, Los Ríos
- Broadcaster: Gamavisión
- Entrants: 18
- Placements: 10
- Withdrawals: Manabí; Napo; USA Community
- Returns: Chimborazo; El Oro; Santo Domingo; Sucumbíos
- Winner: Nayelhi González; Esmeraldas

Miss Ecuador 2022 was the 72nd edition of the Miss Ecuador pageant, held at the Malecón Eloy Alfaro in Quevedo, Los Ríos, Ecuador, on September 3, 2022.

Susy Sacoto of Manabí crowned Nayelhi González of Esmeraldas as her successor at the end of the event. González represented Ecuador in Miss Universe 2022 but was unplaced, and first Runner-up Georgette Kalil of Guayas competed at Miss International 2023.

== Results ==
=== Placements ===
Placement	Contestant
Miss Ecuador 2022	Esmeraldas – Nayelhi Alejandra González
1st Runner-Up (Miss International Ecuador 2023)	Guayas – Tatiana Georgette Kalil
2nd Runner-Up	Pichincha – Samantha Quenedit
3rd Runner-Up	Pichincha – Diana Nicole Puga
4th Runner-Up	El Oro – Juliana Jariel Robles
5th Runner-Up	Los Ríos – Landy Milena Párraga
Top 10	Guayas – Juliette Romina Kronfle; Guayas – Nicole Viviana Solórzano; Los Ríos – María Cristina Zambrano; Santo Domingo – Alejandra Estefanía Lombedia

== Contestants ==
Eighteen contestants competed for the title:

Province	Contestant	Age (Note: Ages at the time of the pageant)	Height	Hometown
Azuay	Emily Alejandra Alvarado Morales	19	1.80 m (5 ft 11 in)	Cuenca
Azuay	Sofía Isabella Peña Guillén	20	1.70 m (5 ft 7 in)	Cuenca
Chimborazo	Tatiana Lisbeth Álvarez Sánchez	21	1.73 m (5 ft 8 in)	Riobamba
El Oro	Juliana Jariel Robles Requelme	19	1.75 m (5 ft 9 in)	Machala
Esmeraldas	Nayelhi Alejandra González Ulloa	26	1.76 m (5 ft 9 1/2 in)	Esmeraldas
Guayas	Mazly Michell Yuqui Silva	25	1.74 m (5 ft 8 1/2 in)	Bucay
Guayas	Nicole Viviana Solórzano Montero	25	1.70 m (5 ft 7 in)	Durán
Guayas	Tatiana Georgette Kalil Roha	20	1.75 m (5 ft 9 in)	Guayaquil
Guayas	Juliette Romina Kronfle Achi	20	1.72 m (5 ft 7 1/2 in)	Guayaquil
Loja	Luciana Martina Córdova Tapia	21	1.63 m (5 ft 4 in)	Celica
Los Ríos	Landy Milena Párraga Goyburo	21	1.65 m (5 ft 5 in)	Quevedo
Los Ríos	María Cristina Zambrano Recalde	26	1.70 m (5 ft 7 in)	Quevedo
Pichincha	Camila Alejandra Del Castillo Coronado	26	1.65 m (5 ft 5 in)	Quito
Pichincha	Luciana Coralía Estrella Vallejo	20	1.63 m (5 ft 4 in)	Quito
Pichincha	Diana Nicole Puga Cadena	24	1.74 m (5 ft 8 1/2 in)	Quito
Pichincha	Samantha Quenedit Sánchez	22	1.70 m (5 ft 7 in)	Quito
Sucumbíos	Génesis Nicol Salazar Jiménez	20	1.69 m (5 ft 6 1/2 in)	Shushufindi
Santo Domingo de los Tsáchilas	Alejandra Estefanía Lombedia Garófalo	26	1.71 m (5 ft 7 1/2 in)	Santo Domingo
