= Landy Párraga =

Ecuadorian model and beauty pageant contestant

- Born: Landy Milena Párraga Goyburo; February 26, 2001; Quevedo, Ecuador
- Died: April 28, 2024 (aged 23); Quevedo, Ecuador
- Cause of death: Murder (gunshot wounds)
- Occupations: Model, influencer
- Height: 1.65 m (5 ft 5 in)

Landy Milena Párraga Goyburo (February 26, 2001 – April 28, 2024) was an Ecuadorian model, influencer and beauty contestant, who placed fifth in the Miss Ecuador 2022 competition. A popular influencer, Párraga had her own line of sportswear and over a million followers on social media.

== Early life ==
Landy Milena Párraga Goyburo was born on February 26, 2001, in the city of Quevedo. She studied Social Communication at the Universidad Técnica de Babahoyo (UTB) and lived in the Ecuadorian city of Santo Domingo.

== Foray into beauty contests ==
Párraga's first title was queen of her parish. Later she became Vice Queen "Vicereina" of Quevedo. In 2019 she was named Miss Tourism of Quevedo. She was then named Queen of the Faculty of her university, Queen of the Special Forces Group #26 Cenepa, and then she rose to represent Ecuador at the Miss Mesoamerica Internacional 2022 contest in El Salvador.

=== Miss Ecuador 2022 ===
She participated in the beauty contest of Miss Ecuador 2022, representing Los Ríos Province, where she was placed fifth in the contest.

In December 2023, Párraga's name was mentioned in communications related to the Caso Metástasis investigations into the drug cartel activities. She was linked romantically to the drug trafficker es:Leandro Norero, who had been killed in prison in October 2022.

== Death ==
On April 28, 2024, Párraga was murdered while eating lunch in a restaurant. About 20 minutes earlier, she had published a photo on Instagram of her meal, revealing her location. Párraga was shot in the head and body, by a hitman who entered the restaurant and fled with an associate afterwards. She was pronounced dead at the scene. Her shooting was captured on the restaurant's CCTV.

Several theories abounded about the motivation for Párraga's killing, mostly due to her connection with Norero. Some speculated that Párraga's killing was ordered by his widow, or by Norero himself. The motive for the crime remains unknown.

=== Funeral ===
Párraga was buried in her hometown of Quevedo on April 29, 2024, under the strongest security measures.
