= Miss Ecuador 2021 =

71st edition of the Miss Ecuador Competition

- Date: September 11, 2021
- Presenters: Roberto Rodríguez; Claudia Schiess; Suly Castillo (Backstage)
- Entertainment: Maykel
- Venue: Malecón Eloy Alfaro, Quevedo, Los Ríos
- Broadcaster: Gamavisión
- Entrants: 20
- Placements: 11
- Withdrawals: Galápagos; Imbabura; Morona Santiago; Santo Domingo; Tungurahua
- Returns: Azuay; USA Community
- Winner: Susana Sacoto; Manabí

Miss Ecuador 2021 was the 71st edition of the Miss Ecuador pageant, held at the Malecón Eloy Alfaro in Quevedo, Ecuador, on September 11, 2021.

Leyla Espinoza of Los Ríos crowned Susana Sacoto of Manabí as her successor at the end of the event. Sacoto represented Ecuador at Miss Universe 2021, and the first runner-up competed at Miss International 2022.

== Contestants ==
There are 20 official delegates to compete at Miss Ecuador 2021:

Province	Contestant	Age	Height	Hometown
Azuay	Mariana Betsabeth Heredia Heras	22	1.71 m (5 ft 7 1/2 in)	Cuenca
Azuay	Katherine Idrovo Zambrano	25	1.71 m (5 ft 7 1/2 in)	Cuenca
Esmeraldas	Melane Belén Rubio Estupiñán	22	1.82 m (5 ft 11 1/2 in)	Esmeraldas
Guayas	Valery Romina Carabalí Medina	23	1.72 m (5 ft 7 1/2 in)	Guayaquil
Guayas	Génesis Nicole Guerrero Cabrera	23	1.74 m (5 ft 8 1/2 in)	Guayaquil
Guayas	Sofia de los Ángeles Jiménez Thompson	21	1.75 m (5 ft 9 in)	Guayaquil
Guayas	Victoria Denisse Salcedo Portocarrero	25	1.70 m (5 ft 7 in)	Guayaquil
Guayas	Heather Ashley Valdéz Yépez	18	1.75 m (5 ft 9 in)	Guayaquil
Guayas	Verónica Andrea Mora Romero	26	1.75 m (5 ft 9 in)	Milagro
Loja	Leidy Maribel Granda Rey	23	1.72 m (5 ft 7 1/2 in)	Celica
Los Ríos	Karla Ninhoska Romero Fuentes	24	1.71 m (5 ft 7 1/2 in)	Quevedo
Manabí	Jeniffer Nayeska García Moreira	19	1.73 m (5 ft 8 in)	Manta
Manabí	Susana "Susy" Valeria Sacoto Mendoza	24	1.71 m (5 ft 7 1/2 in)	Portoviejo
Napo	Marilyn Lizbeth Torres Vinueza	26	1.72 m (5 ft 7 1/2 in)	El Chaco
Pichincha	Joselyn Mabel Báez Luna	22	1.74 m (5 ft 8 1/2 in)	Quito
Pichincha	Yuriel Stephania Cabezas Zapata	25	1.80 m (5 ft 11 in)	Quito
Pichincha	Tabata Fernanda Cortés Chávez	24	1.78 m (5 ft 10 in)	Quito
Pichincha	Vanessa Lilibeth Jaramillo Polo	25	1.72 m (5 ft 7 1/2 in)	Quito
Pichincha	Aline Paulette Morales Ordóñez	19	1.73 m (5 ft 8 in)	Quito
USA Community	Valeria Gutiérrez Pinto	22	1.73 m (5 ft 8 in)	Miami / Guayaquil
