= List of top 10 singles in 2014 (France) =

This is a list of singles that have peaked in the top 10 of the French Singles Chart in 2014. 67 singles were in the top 10 this year, 7 of which were in the number-one spot.

== Top 10 singles ==
| Artist(s) | Single | Peak | Peak date |
|---|---|---|---|
| Indila | "Dernière danse" | 2 | 12 January |
| Lily Allen | "Somewhere Only We Know" | 6 | 26 January |
| OneRepublic | "Counting Stars" | 7 | 2 February |
| Lorde | "Royals" | 4 | 2 February |
| Booba | "La mort leur va si bien" | 7 | 9 February |
| Shakira featuring Rihanna | "Can't Remember to Forget You" | 5 | 9 February |
| Daft Punk featuring Julian Casablancas | "Instant Crush" | 4 | 9 February |
| David Guetta featuring Skylar Grey | "Shot Me Down" | 6 | 16 February |
| Cats on Trees | "Sirens Call" | 3 | 16 February |
| Beyoncé featuring Jay Z | "Drunk in Love" | 9 | 23 February |
| London Grammar | "Wasting My Young Years" | 2 | 23 February |
| Coldplay | "Magic" | 6 | 9 March |
| Klingande | "Jubel" | 5 | 9 March |
| Faul & Wad Ad vs. Pnau | "Changes" | 9 | 16 March |
| Katy Perry featuring Juicy J | "Dark Horse" | 6 | 16 March |
| Clean Bandit featuring Jess Glynne | "Rather Be" | 2 | 23 March |
| Avicii | "Addicted to You" | 6 | 30 March |
| David Guetta and Showtek featuring Vassy | "Bad" | 6 | 13 April |
| Disclosure featuring Eliza Doolittle | "You & Me" | 2 | 13 April |
| Coldplay | "Midnight" | 5 | 27 April |
| Rebel and Sidney Housen | "Black Pearl (He's a Pirate)" | 3 | 27 April |
| Cris Cab | "Liar Liar" | 5 | 11 May |
| John Legend | "All of Me" | 4 | 11 May |
| Mr Probz | "Waves" | 3 | 11 May |
| Milky Chance | "Stolen Dance" | 1 | 11 May |
| Michael Jackson and Justin Timberlake | "Love Never Felt So Good" | 2 | 18 May |
| Deorro | "Five Hours" | 8 | 25 May |
| Booba | "OKLM" | 1 | 1 June |
| Black M | "Sur ma route" | 1 | 8 June |
| Pitbull featuring Jennifer Lopez and Claudia Leitte | "We Are One (Ole Ola)" | 3 | 15 June |
| Ed Sheeran | "Sing" | 5 | 29 June |
| Jason Derulo featuring Snoop Dogg | "Wiggle" | 4 | 29 June |
| Magic System and Chawki | "Magic in the Air" | 3 | 29 June |
| Sia | "Chandelier" | 1 | 6 July |
| Indila | "S.O.S" | 8 | 13 July |
| Lilly Wood and the Prick | "Prayer in C (Robin Schulz remix)" | 1 | 13 July |
| Keen'V | "Dis-moi oui (Marina)" | 10 | 10 August |
| Nico & Vinz | "Am I Wrong" | 6 | 10 August |
| Mika | "Boum Boum Boum" | 10 | 17 August |
| Calogero | "Un jour au mauvais endroit" | 4 | 24 August |
| Coldplay | "A Sky Full of Stars" | 3 | 24 August |
| Eminem featuring Sia | "Guts Over Fear" | 10 | 31 August |
| David Guetta featuring Sam Martin | "Lovers on the Sun" | 5 | 31 August |
| Tove Lo | "Habits (Stay High)" | 2 | 31 August |
| Fly Project | "Toca-Toca" | 10 | 7 September |
| Sam Smith | "Stay with Me" | 6 | 7 September |
| Black M and Dr Beriz | "La légende Black" | 8 | 28 September |
| George Ezra | "Budapest" | 4 | 28 September |
| Iggy Azalea featuring Rita Ora | "Black Widow" | 9 | 5 October |
| David Guetta featuring Sam Martin | "Dangerous" | 1 | 12 October |
| Martin Tungevaag | "Wicked Wonderland" | 9 | 19 October |
| Soprano | "Cosmo" | 5 | 19 October |
| H Magnum | "Idem" | 10 | 26 October |
| Disclosure featuring Sam Smith | "Latch" | 8 | 9 November |
| Calvin Harris featuring John Newman | "Blame" | 7 | 9 November |
| Black M featuring The Shin Sekaï and Doomams | "Je ne dirai rien" | 9 | 16 November |
| Meghan Trainor | "All About That Bass" | 8 | 23 November |
| The Avener | "Fade Out Lines" | 3 | 23 November |
| Alonzo and Booba | "Même tarif" | 8 | 30 November |
| Josef Salvat | "Diamonds" | 2 | 30 November |
| Selah Sue | "Alone" | 9 | 7 December |
| Garou and Ryan | "Petit garçon" | 3 | 7 December |
| Dosseh | "Le coup du patron" | 10 | 14 December |
| Emma Louise | "Jungle" | 3 | 21 December |
| Mark Ronson featuring Bruno Mars | "Uptown Funk" | 1 | 21 December |
| Mariah Carey | "All I Want for Christmas Is You" | 8 | 28 December |
| Kendji Girac | "Andalouse" | 3 | 28 December |

== Entries by artists ==
The following table shows artists who achieved two or more top 10 entries in 2014. The figures include both main artists and featured artists and the peak positions in brackets.

| Entries | Artist | Singles |
|---|---|---|
| 4 | David Guetta | "Shot Me Down" (6), "Bad" (6), "Lovers on the Sun" (5), "Dangerous" (1) |
| 3 | Black M | "Sur ma route" (1)", "La Légende black" (8), "Je ne dirai rien" (9) |
| 3 | Booba | "La mort leur va si bien" (7), "OKLM" (1)", Même tarif" (8), |
| 3 | Coldplay | "Magic" (6), "Midnight" (5), "A Sky Full of Stars" (3), |
| 2 | Disclosure | "You & Me" (2), "Latch" (8), |
| 2 | Indila | "Dernière danse" (2), "S.O.S." (8) |
| 2 | Sia | "Chandelier" (1), "Guts Over Fear" (10) |
| 2 | Sam Smith | "Stay with Me" (6), "Latch" (8), |

== See also ==
- 2014 in music
- List of number-one hits of 2014 (France)
