= Georgette Kalil =

Ecuadorian Model & Miss International Ecuador 2023

- Born: Tatiana Georgette Kalil Roha; Guayaquil, Ecuador
- Education: Universidad Catolica de Santiago de Guayaquil
- Occupation: Model
- Beauty pageant titleholder
- Title: Miss International Ecuador 2023
- Major competitions: Miss Ecuador 2022; (Winner – Miss International Ecuador 2023); (Best Face); Miss International 2023; (Unplaced)

Tatiana Georgette Kalil Roha (born June 8, 2002) is an Ecuadorian model and beauty pageant titleholder who was crowned Miss International Ecuador 2023. She represented Ecuador at the Miss International 2023 pageant.

== Early life and education ==
Kalil is currently studying a bachelor's degree in clinical psychology at Universidad Católica de Santiago de Guayaquil.

== Pageantry ==
=== Miss Ecuador 2022 ===
Kalil began her pageantry career in 2022. On June 11, 2022, she was announced as one of the 18 official contestants for Miss Ecuador 2022. Where she represented Guayaquil at the national beauty contest. On September 3, 2022, she competed at the Malecón Eloy Alfaro in Quevedo. During the final, Kalil was awarded as "Miss Catrice" (Best Face) of the pageant by the sponsor and won the contest. She was crowned in the final as the winner of Miss International Ecuador 2023 by her predecessor, Valeria Gutiérrez.

=== Miss International 2023 ===
As the winner of Miss International Ecuador 2023, Kalil represented Ecuador at the Miss International 2023 held on October 26, 2023 in Japan but unplaced.

Awards and achievements
Preceded by USA Community; Valeria Gutiérrez	Miss Ecuador 1st Runner-Up; 2022	Succeeded by Paulethe Cajas
Preceded by USA Community; Valeria Gutiérrez	Miss International Ecuador; 2023	Succeeded by Paulethe Cajas
