= List of number-one albums of 2014 (Belgium) =

The Belgian Albums Chart, divided into the two main regions Flanders and Wallonia, ranks the best-performing albums in Belgium, as compiled by Ultratop.

== Flanders ==
Issue date	Album	Artist	Reference
4 January	Racine carrée	Stromae	
11 January	Racine carrée	Stromae	
18 January	High Hopes	Bruce Springsteen	
25 January	High Hopes	Bruce Springsteen	
1 February	Racine carrée	Stromae	
8 February	Racine carrée	Stromae	
15 February	Racine carrée	Stromae	
22 February	Racine carrée	Stromae	
1 March	Racine carrée	Stromae	
8 March	Racine carrée	Stromae	
15 March	G I R L	Pharrell Williams	
22 March	The Great Scam	Admiral Freebee	
29 March	The Take Off and Landing of Everything	Elbow	
5 April	Inside Outside	Novastar	
12 April	Silver Linings	Milow	
19 April	Furu	Arsenal	
26 April	By Absence of the Sun	Triggerfinger	
3 May	By Absence of the Sun	Triggerfinger	
10 May	By Absence of the Sun	Triggerfinger	
17 May	Xscape	Michael Jackson	
24 May	Ghost Stories	Coldplay	
31 May	Ghost Stories	Coldplay	
7 June	Ghost Stories	Coldplay	
14 June	Ghost Stories	Coldplay	
21 June	Ghost Stories	Coldplay	
28 June	Ultraviolence	Lana Del Rey	
5 July	Ghost Stories	Coldplay	
12 July	5 Seconds of Summer	5 Seconds of Summer	
19 July	Racine carrée	Stromae	
26 July	Altijd onderweg	Christoff	
2 August	Altijd onderweg	Christoff	
9 August	Altijd onderweg	Christoff	
16 August	Altijd onderweg	Christoff	
23 August	Racine carrée	Stromae	
30 August	Entity	Oscar and the Wolf	
6 September	My Everything	Ariana Grande	
13 September	Where Neon Goes To Die	Magnus	
20 September	Where Neon Goes To Die	Magnus	
27 September	This Marauder's Midnight	Gabriel Ríos	
4 October	Popular Problems	Leonard Cohen	
11 October	Op de groei	Bart Peeters	
18 October	Op de groei	Bart Peeters	
25 October	Op de groei	Bart Peeters	
1 November	Op de groei	Bart Peeters	
8 November	1989	Taylor Swift	
15 November	The Endless River	Pink Floyd	
22 November	Sonic Highways	Foo Fighters	
29 November	Four	One Direction	
6 December	Rock or Bust	AC/DC	
13 December	Rock or Bust	AC/DC	
20 December	Rock or Bust	AC/DC	
27 December	Safety First	Soundtrack	

== Wallonia ==
Issue date	Album	Artist	Reference
4 January	Racine carrée	Stromae	
11 January	Racine carrée	Stromae	
18 January	Racine carrée	Stromae	
25 January	Racine carrée	Stromae	
1 February	Racine carrée	Stromae	
8 February	Racine carrée	Stromae	
15 February	Racine carrée	Stromae	
22 February	Racine carrée	Stromae	
1 March	En équilibre	Suarez	
8 March	Racine carrée	Stromae	
15 March	Racine carrée	Stromae	
22 March	Bon anniversaire les Enfoirés	Les Enfoirés	
29 March	Bon anniversaire les Enfoirés	Les Enfoirés	
5 April	Bon anniversaire les Enfoirés	Les Enfoirés	
12 April	Racine carrée	Stromae	
19 April	Racine carrée	Stromae	
26 April	Racine carrée	Stromae	
3 May	Mini World	Indila	
10 May	Racine carrée	Stromae	
17 May	Xscape	Michael Jackson	
24 May	Ghost Stories	Coldplay	
31 May	Ghost Stories	Coldplay	
7 June	Ghost Stories	Coldplay	
14 June	Ghost Stories	Coldplay	
21 June	La Bande à Renaud	Various Artists	
28 June	Ultraviolence	Lana Del Rey	
5 July	Mini World	Indila	
12 July	Mini World	Indila	
19 July	Racine carrée	Stromae	
26 July	Racine carrée	Stromae	
2 August	Racine carrée	Stromae	
9 August	Racine carrée	Stromae	
16 August	Racine carrée	Stromae	
23 August	Racine carrée	Stromae	
30 August	Les feux d'artifice	Calogero	
6 September	Les feux d'artifice	Calogero	
13 September	Les feux d'artifice	Calogero	
20 September	Les feux d'artifice	Calogero	
27 September	Les feux d'artifice	Calogero	
4 October	Les feux d'artifice	Calogero	
11 October	Les feux d'artifice	Calogero	
18 October	Les feux d'artifice	Calogero	
25 October	Songs of Innocence	U2	
1 November	Les feux d'artifice	Calogero	
8 November	Les feux d'artifice	Calogero	
15 November	The Endless River	Pink Floyd	
22 November	The Endless River	Pink Floyd	
29 November	Rester vivant	Johnny Hallyday	
6 December	Alain Souchon & Laurent Voulzy	Alain Souchon & Laurent Voulzy	
13 December	Rock or Bust	AC/DC	
20 December	Les feux d'artifice	Calogero	
27 December	Les feux d'artifice	Calogero	
