= True Love (Coldplay song) =

Single by Coldplay

from the album Ghost Stories
- Released: 14 August 2014
- Recorded: 2013–2014
- Studio: The Bakery (London); The Beehive (London)
- Genre: Electronic; pop rock
- Length: 4:06 (album version); 3:36 (radio edit)
- Label: Parlophone; Atlantic
- Songwriters: Guy Berryman; Jonny Buckland; Will Champion; Chris Martin
- Producers: Coldplay; Paul Epworth; Daniel Green; Rik Simpson

Coldplay singles chronology
"A Sky Full of Stars" (2014)	"True Love" (2014)	"Ink" (2014)

Alternative cover
- Alternative cover for the version remixed by Davide Rossi

Music video
- "True Love" on YouTube

"True Love" is a song by the British rock band Coldplay for their sixth studio album Ghost Stories, where it appears as the fourth track. It was released by Parlophone as the album's third single on 14 August 2014. The band co-produced the track with Paul Epworth, Daniel Green and Rik Simpson, while American record producer Timbaland provided additional drums.

The song's main instrumentation consists in heavy rhythms, dancing synths and wallowing strings. It also features a guitar solo. Lyrically, "True Love" talks about heartache and how the protagonist can't bear the pain of losing his lover. The song's lyrics were addressed to be about Martin's divorce from his wife Gwyneth Paltrow, a recurrent theme on the whole album. Martin has claimed that "True Love" is the band's favorite track it has ever written.

The song garnered acclaim from music critics, who commended the song's raw honesty and its lyrics, which were seen as haunting and painfully truthful. Commercially successful in Belgium and the Netherlands, "True Love" did not chart on the UK Singles Chart. The accompanying music video for the song was directed by Jonas Åkerlund, who also directed the "Magic" video. It was shot in Los Angeles, choreographed by Blanca Li and centres around a tale of two ballet-loving outsiders, played by Martin and Canadian actress Jessica Lucas.

== Background and release ==
After the success of their fifth studio album, Mylo Xyloto (2011), which sold more than 8 million copies worldwide and spawned the hit singles "Paradise" and "Princess of China", Coldplay planned to release a more stripped-down record. Frontman Chris Martin claimed that the album is about "life itself and all its glorious colorfulness", while critics noted that it was inspired in Martin's divorce from actress Gwyneth Paltrow deemed it a "breakup album". Martin elaborated:

Up to a certain point in my life I wasn't completely vulnerable and it caused some problems. If you don't let love in then you can't really give it back. So what "Ghost Stories" means to me is like, you've got to open yourself up to love and if you really do, of course it will be painful at times, but then it will be great at some point.

On 4 August 2014, the band announced "True Love" as the album's third single, along with its artwork, which was created by artist Mila Fürstová. The song was officially released on 14 August 2014. Regarding the decision to release "True Love" as a single, Martin commented:

Sometimes we'll pick a single knowing that it doesn't really fit into how singles should sound or do sound. Our whole philosophy, especially recently, has been to follow our gut feeling. If we feel like this record needs to be a bit smaller and shouldn't tour it, then we follow it, and we worry about the consequences afterwards. I think choosing 'True Love' as a single is probably the same kind of thing. Somehow for me it completes the trio of things that we want to represent the album.

== Composition and production ==
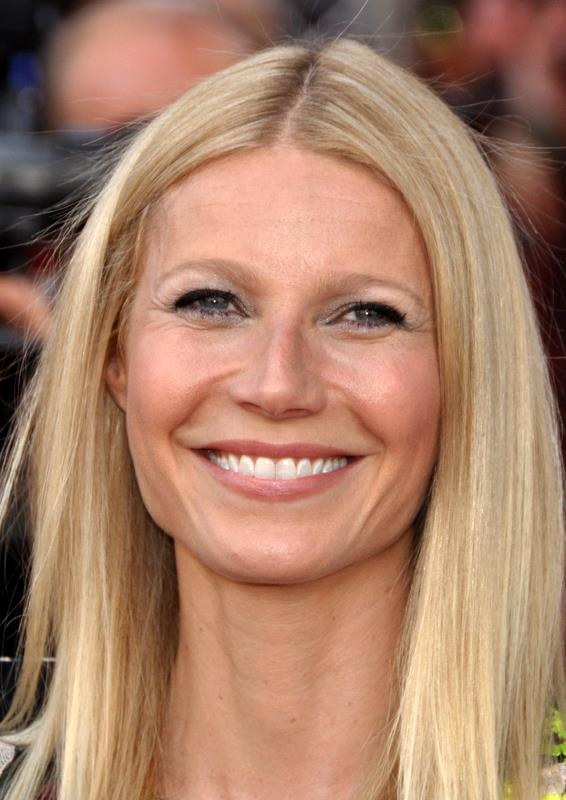
"True Love"'s lyrical content was allegedly about Chris Martin's divorce from actress Gwyneth Paltrow.

"True Love" was written by Guy Berryman, Jonny Buckland, Will Champion and Chris Martin, with production being handled by the band with Paul Epworth, Daniel Green and Rik Simpson. American record producer Timbaland provided additional drums, while Davide Rossi arranged strings. The song is written in the key of G-flat major, with a moderate tempo of 120 beats per minute. Martin's vocal range spans from the low note of G♭3 to the high note of G♭5. Its instrumentation consist in heavy rhythms, dancing synths and wallowing strings. Chris DeVille of Stereogum noted that the song has "Timbaland show[ing] up to add 'Apologize'-style schmaltz" and "a mournful guitar solo".

Lyrically, "True Love" deals with themes of heartbreak. DeVille writes that Martin "lashes out at his lover's alleged lies on 'True Love' even as he strains to bring back the old feelings" in the lines "And I wish you would [sic] have let me know/ What's really going on below/ I've lost you now, you've let me go/ But one last time/ Tell me you love me". In the chorus, the truth is too painful to bear, so the singer instructs his partner "Just tell me you love me/ If you don't, then lie/ Oh, lie to me".

== Critical reception ==
"True Love" received acclaim from music critics, who went on to praise its lyrics and instrumentation. Caryn Ganz of Rolling Stone felt that the song's "detuned, squalling guitar solo is the album's most jarring but ultimately most satisfying sonic moment. It's probably not the song Martin wanted to write, but it's the one he needs right now". Jason Lipshutz of Billboard noted that "True Love" makes the band "deliver perhaps the saddest song on the album [...] as Martin echoes his phrases – 'Tell me you love me, if you don't then lie' – to create a sense of begging". Stephanie Benson of Spin wrote that the track "climaxes with a moody, languid guitar solo straight out of John Mayer's seduction handbook". Matthew Horton of NME observed that "the real heart of 'Ghost Stories' is in [...] the choppy dubstep textures of 'True Love' where Martin croaks, 'One last time/Tell me you love me,' and we all start to feel his own hollowness".

Mack Hayden of Paste Magazine called it "the most Coldplay moment on the album, whe[re] Martin sings 'Say that you love me / And if you don't, then lie'. It's this kind of wounded romanticism that made A Rush of Blood to the Head such a wonderful album, and it's good to see it back here". Josh Terry of Consequence of Sound also noted that the lyrics are "one of his most gutting lines ever", noting that "they're devastating words". Stephen Thomas Erlewine of Allmusic claimed that the addition of Timbaland "giv[es] Ghost Stories a fleet electronic facility that undercuts Coldplay's reputation as a dogmatic rock band without ever suggesting the group is adventurous". Jamieson Cox of Time praised "the skittering percussion that drives the weepy [track]," while Larry Fitzmaurice of Pitchfork named it a "Spandau Ballet-gone-Disney ballad". Adam Silverstein of Digital Spy wrote that the "transcendent" song "hit[s] you like a strike from Magneto".

== Music video ==
The song's music video was directed by Jonas Åkerlund, who also directed the "Magic" video. It was shot in the Los Angeles Theater, Los Angeles on 24 June 2014 and Venice Beach on 25 June 2014 and premiered on 22 August 2014. The video stars Chris Martin and Canadian actress Jessica Lucas. According to Åkerlund, the video "came about in the same way as 'Magic' did. One thing I said early was that I wanted it to be very different in tone from 'Magic'. But related somehow because it has a story".

=== Synopsis ===
The music video begins with Martin in a fat suit toddling along to the metro bus and, realising he could never fit through the door, hitches a ride at the rear of the bus on a skateboard to his destination, which is a Los Angeles theatre where there's a ballet rehearsing. Later, an aspirant ballerina, played by Lucas, also stuck in a fat suit hops along to an audition where a line of slender dancers give her sidelong glances. She hands over her portfolio to the people holding the audition and, because of her appearance, is immediately rejected. Hurt, she instead heads to the Venice Beach boardwalk in Los Angeles where, in spite of her large size, dances to her heart's content. Meanwhile, Martin's rotund character gets a menial job as janitor and is tossing trash into the dumpster before his 'boss' comes out in the alley and kicks him back to work. The ballerina's home is a trailer and she plops down into a chair to rest and daydream. Meanwhile, back at the theatre, the ballet dancers are rehearsing and Chris steps into the background with his bucket until the director shouts, 'Excuse me!'. A postal worker brings the girl an invite from the theatre, while Chris is shown watering the plants and dancing in his own makeshift stage that he's created outside on the roof of the landmark building. The marquee blazes 'Big Ballet Premiere' as the big girl tries to find a seat in the audience. Later, tears come to her eyes while watching the partners twirl on stage, but when the show is over she finds she can't get out of her little chair. Then, Chris waltzes onto the stage with his partner, and the girl is compelled to join him in a dance making theirs a perfect match.

== Track listing ==
Digital download
No.	Title	Length
1.	"True Love"	4:06

Digital download (Davide Rossi Remix)
No.	Title	Length
1.	"True Love" (Davide Rossi Remix)	4:42

== Personnel ==
Adapted from the Ghost Stories liner notes.

Coldplay

- Guy Berryman – bass guitar, keyboards
- Jonny Buckland – lead guitar
- Will Champion – drums, backing vocals, programming
- Chris Martin – lead vocals, piano, acoustic guitar, keyboards

Additional musicians

- Timothy Mosley – additional drums
- Davide Rossi – strings (arrangement)

Technical personnel

- Paul Epworth – production
- Rik Simpson – production
- Daniel Green – production

Artistic personnel

- Mila Fürstová – artwork

== Charts ==
Weekly chart performance
Chart (2014)	Peak position
Belgium (Ultratip Bubbling Under Flanders)	3
Belgium (Ultratip Bubbling Under Wallonia)	12
France (SNEP)	146
Iceland (RÚV)	12
Netherlands (Dutch Top 40 Tipparade)	6
South Korea International (Gaon)	58
Switzerland Airplay (Schweizer Hitparade)	77
UK Singles (Official Charts Company)	180
US Hot Rock & Alternative Songs (Billboard)	42

== Release history ==
Release dates and formats
Region	Date	Format	Label	Ref.
Australia	14 August 2014	Digital download	Parlophone	
Australia	1 December 2014	Digital download (Davide Rossi remix)	Parlophone	
