= Ink (song) =

Single by Coldplay

from the album Ghost Stories
- Released: 13 October 2014
- Recorded: 2012–2014
- Studio: The Bakery (London); The Beehive (London)
- Genre: Pop rock; R&B
- Length: 3:48 (album version); 4:09 (live version)
- Label: Parlophone; Atlantic
- Songwriters: Guy Berryman; Jonny Buckland; Will Champion; Chris Martin
- Producers: Coldplay; Paul Epworth; Daniel Green; Rik Simpson

Coldplay singles chronology
"True Love" (2014)	"Ink" (2014)	"Adventure of a Lifetime" (2015)

Music video
- "Ink" (Fans' Cut) on YouTube

"Ink" is a song by the British rock band Coldplay from their sixth studio album Ghost Stories (2014). It was released as the fourth and final single from the record on 13 October in Italy's contemporary hit radio, 17 November in the United States' adult album alternative radio and 18 November in modern rock radio. The song reached number 156 on the UK Singles Chart upon the album's release.

== Music video ==
The animated video was designed by the production team, Blind. An interactive video of "Ink" was uploaded on Coldplay's official website. An official cut was made and uploaded on YouTube.

=== Synopsis ===
The official animated music video begins with a couple lying on a beach. The woman leaves the man on the beach and walks into the woods. The man takes a compass (which contains an image of the woman) and follows her. The man soon arrives at a fork in the trail, and takes the path to the right. He does not find her, and is then seen at a bar, contemplating his loneliness. The video continues with the man drifting along the ocean, looking at a cloud resembling the woman. The man soon arrives at a waterfall, but is saved by a large bird before falling down. He sees the woman in the clouds once again, but falls from the sky moments before trying to embrace her. Many papers surround the man and build a staircase. The man climbs up and looks at the stars through a telescope. The man sees many constellations of the couple. He then walks up to a shoreline and examines one of the constellations, which turns into one large star, and then proceeds in that direction. The man sails a boat toward the star for over a day, and soon arrives at a mega waterfall. Right before he falls off, the woman finally appears and saves him, and they float through the air, together once more.

== Live performances ==
The band performed "Ink" during their brief and intimate Ghost Stories Tour. They also performed the song on select dates of their A Head Full of Dreams Tour, including on April 4, 2017, in Manila to fulfill the request of a cancer-stricken fan whom lead vocalist Chris Martin visited prior to the show.

== Track listing ==
Digital download
No.	Title	Length
1.	"Ink" (Live at Le Casino de Paris, Paris)	4:09

Promotional CD single
No.	Title	Length
1.	"Ink"	3:48
2.	"Ink" (Instrumental)	3:48
Total length:		7:36

== Personnel ==
Adapted from the Ghost Stories liner notes.

Coldplay

- Guy Berryman – bass guitar, keyboards
- Jonny Buckland – lead guitar, slide guitar
- Will Champion – drums, backing vocals
- Chris Martin – lead vocals, acoustic guitar

Technical personnel

- Paul Epworth – production
- Rik Simpson – production
- Daniel Green – production

== Charts ==
=== Weekly charts ===
Weekly chart performance
Chart (2014–2015)	Peak position
Belgium (Ultratip Bubbling Under Flanders)	4
Belgium (Ultratip Bubbling Under Wallonia)	16
Iceland (RÚV)	22
Italy (FIMI)	49
Italy Airplay (EarOne)	10
Netherlands (Dutch Top 40)	31
Netherlands (Single Top 100)	68
South Korea International (Gaon)	59
Swiss Airplay (Schweizer Hitparade)	81
UK Singles (OCC)	156

=== Year-end charts ===
Year-end chart performance
Chart (2014)	Position
Italy Airplay (EarOne)	99
Netherlands (Dutch Top 50)	158

Chart (2015)	Position
Netherlands (Dutch Top 50)	149

== Certifications ==
Certifications
Region	Certification	Certified units/sales
Italy (FIMI)	Platinum	50,000^{‡}
^{‡} Sales+streaming figures based on certification alone.

== Release history ==
Release dates and formats
Region	Date	Format	Label	Ref.
Italy	13 October 2014	Contemporary hit radio	Parlophone	
United States	17 November 2014	Adult album alternative radio	Parlophone; Atlantic	
United States	18 November 2014	Modern rock radio	Parlophone; Atlantic	
