= W Austin Hotel and Residences =

Coordinates: 30.2659°N 97.7471°W

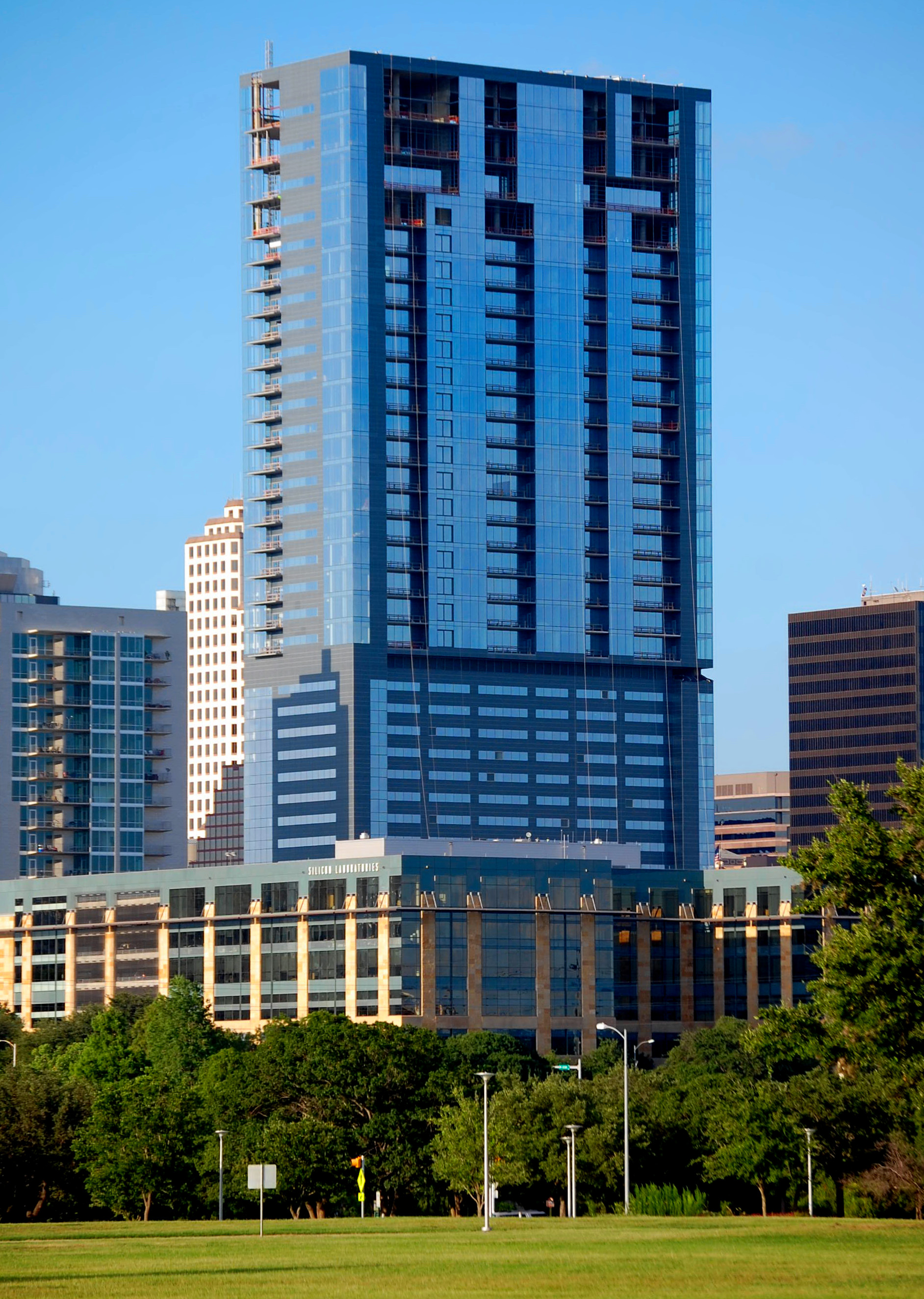
- The building topped out from Butler Park
- Interactive map of the W Austin Hotel and Residences area

General information
- Status: Completed
- Type: Hotel, residential
- Location: 200 Lavaca Street; Austin, Texas
- Estimated completion: 2010
- Opening: 2010

Height
- Roof: 145 m (476 ft)

Technical details
- Floor count: 37

Design and construction
- Architect: Andersson-Wise Architects

W Austin Hotel and Residences is a 37-story hotel and residential skyscraper in the Block 21 mixed-use development in Downtown Austin, Texas, adjacent to the Second Street district. It opened in December 2010. Standing at 478 feet above the ground and 37 stories, it is a residential building that sits behind the Austin City Hall. It holds 251 hotel units, managed by W Hotels and 159 condominiums. Magic Johnson's investment company Canyon Johnson Urban Fund II is the primary investor and he also attended the opening ceremony.

The hotel's neighbor in Block 21 is ACL Live at The Moody Theater, where Austin City Limits is recorded.

== June 2011 incident ==
In 2011, three incidents involving glass falling from the balconies of the hotel forced the building to close its doors. The first occurred on June 11 when two glass panels from the 24th and 25th floors fell into the swimming pool area, injuring four people. The second happened 16 days later on June 27, when three more panels fell onto 3rd and Lavaca Streets. Following the incident, a thousand glass panels would be replaced. The third and latest glass panel incident occurred on June 29.

== See also ==
- The Austonian
- 360 Condominiums
- Frost Bank Tower
- List of tallest buildings in Austin
