= Another's Arms =

2014 song by Coldplay

Song by Coldplay

from the album Ghost Stories
- Studio: The Bakery (London); The Beehive (London)
- Genre: Alternative rock; R&B; electronic
- Length: 3:54
- Label: Parlophone; Atlantic
- Songwriters: Guy Berryman; Jonny Buckland; Will Champion; Chris Martin
- Producers: Coldplay; Paul Epworth; Daniel Green; Rik Simpson

"Another's Arms" is a song by British rock band Coldplay. It is the sixth track from their sixth studio album, Ghost Stories. It was written, produced, and performed by Coldplay, with co-production handled by Daniel Green, Paul Epworth, and Rik Simpson. The song debuted at number 70 on the UK Singles Chart, number 74 in Ireland and number 52 in Switzerland.

== Composition ==
Lasting for three minutes and 54 seconds, "Another's Arms" features an arrangement of guitars, strings, "whooshing keys", "stuttering drums", a "female specter" that "croons in and out of focus", and Chris Martin's lead vocals. The song contains a vocal sample from "Silver Chord" by Jane Weaver.

== Reception ==
Billboard writer Jason Lipshutz called "Another's Arms" "a songwriting gem", although he found the arrangement "flat". Josh Modell of The A.V. Club felt that it was "undercooked", while Consequence of Sound's Josh Terry said that the song was the "most well-crafted offering" of Ghost Stories.

== Personnel ==
Adapted from the Ghost Stories liner notes.

Coldplay

- Guy Berryman – bass guitar, keyboard
- Jonny Buckland – electric guitar, keyboard, slide guitar
- Will Champion – drums, percussion, backing vocals
- Chris Martin – lead vocals, piano, keyboard

Additional musicians

- John Metcalfe – strings arrangement, conductor

Technical personnel

- Paul Epworth – production
- Coldplay – production
- Daniel Green – production
- Rik Simpson – production
- Mark "Spike" Stent – mixing
- Geoff Swan – assistant mixing
- Mike Dean – extra magic
- Madeon – extra magic
- Ted Jensen – mastering
- Olga Fitzroy – engineering
- Matt Wiggins – engineering
- Jaime Sickora – engineering
- Chris Owens – engineering
- Joe Visciano – engineering
- Tom Bailey – additional studio assistance
- Fiona Cruickshank – additional studio assistance
- Nicolas Essig – additional studio assistance
- Jeff Gartenbaum – additional studio assistance
- Christian Green – additional studio assistance
- Joseph Hartwell Jones – additional studio assistance
- Luca Capezio – additional studio assistance
- Pablo Hernandez – additional studio assistance
- Neil Lambert – additional studio assistance
- Matt McGinn – additional studio assistance
- Adam Miller – additional studio assistance
- Roxy Pope – additional studio assistance
- John Prestage – additional studio assistance
- Bill Rahko – additional studio assistance
- Kyle Stevens – additional studio assistance
- Dave Holmes – management

== Charts ==
Weekly chart performance
Chart (2014)	Peak position
France (SNEP)	83
Ireland (IRMA)	74
Italy (FIMI)	30
South Korea International (Gaon)	68
Switzerland (Schweizer Hitparade)	52
UK Singles (Official Charts)	70
