= A Sky Full of Stars =

2014 single by Coldplay

Single by Coldplay

from the album Ghost Stories
- B-side: "All Your Friends"; "Ghost Story"; "O" (Reprise)
- Released: 2 May 2014
- Recorded: 2013–2014
- Studio: The Bakery (London); The Beehive (London)
- Genre: Alternative rock; EDM; progressive house; folk-EDM
- Length: 4:28 (album and single version); 3:56 (radio edit); 5:38 (extended mix)
- Label: Parlophone; Atlantic
- Songwriters: Guy Berryman; Jonny Buckland; Will Champion; Chris Martin; Tim Bergling
- Producers: Avicii; Coldplay; Paul Epworth; Daniel Green; Rik Simpson

Coldplay singles chronology
"Magic" (2014)	"A Sky Full of Stars" (2014)	"True Love" (2014)

Coldplay EP chronology
Live in Madrid (2011)	A Sky Full of Stars (2014)	Live from Spotify London (2016)

Music video
- "A Sky Full of Stars" on YouTube

"A Sky Full of Stars" is a song by the British rock band Coldplay. It was released on 2 May 2014 as the second single from their sixth studio album, Ghost Stories (2014). An exclusive digital EP version of it, with the B-sides "All Your Friends", "Ghost Story" and "O (Reprise)", came out in the following weeks, being considered the band's eleventh extended play.

The band co-wrote and co-produced the song with Avicii and received production assistance from Paul Epworth, Daniel Green and Rik Simpson. It was recorded at the Bakery and the Beehive in North London, England. Upon its release, "A Sky Full of Stars" garnered mostly positive reviews from music critics and charted inside the top 10 in over 16 countries such as Australia, Canada, Ireland, Japan, Mexico, New Zealand, the United Kingdom and United States.

A music video for the song was directed by Mat Whitecross and was released on 19 June 2014. The single peaked at number one in Italy, Israel, Luxembourg, Portugal, Lebanon, and the Walloon region of Belgium. It also topped the Billboard Hot Dance Club Songs chart. It was nominated for Best Pop Duo/Group Performance at the 57th Grammy Awards.

== Composition ==
A Sky Full of Stars
Sample of "A Sky Full of Stars" from Coldplay's 2014 album Ghost Stories.

"A Sky Full of Stars" marks the band's first dance track, being outlined as an EDM track with house influences. A piano-centric song which is written in the key of G♭ major, the track opens as a piano ballad, with progressive house-influenced electronic music that plays out in between verses. The song follows a chord progression of E♭m7–C♭maj9–G♭–B♭m with a tempo of 125 beats per minute, and the vocals span from A♭_{3} to G♭_{5}. The track has been described as "[falling] in line with the synth-heavy soundscapes of 'Midnight', but with more danceable flavor". The song's repeating chord sequence and varied melody was inspired by the work of American pop singer Katy Perry and Nirvana's "Smells Like Teen Spirit" (1991).

== Recording ==
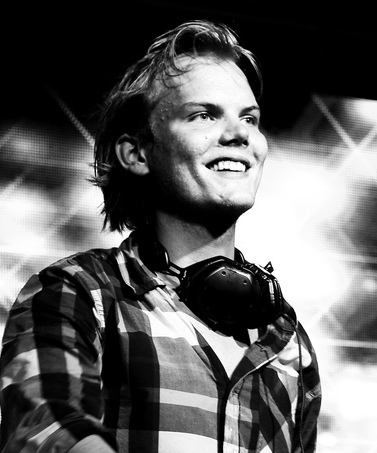
Swedish record producer Avicii was invited by the band to produce "A Sky Full of Stars".

"A Sky Full of Stars" was recorded during the sessions for the band's sixth studio album, at their purpose-built studios the Bakery and the Beehive in North London, England. The studios were both originally constructed for work on their two previous studio albums, 2008's Viva la Vida or Death and All His Friends and 2011's Mylo Xyloto.

Swedish record producer Avicii was invited by the band to collaborate on "A Sky Full of Stars". In addition to producing the track, he was also asked by lead singer Chris Martin to play and record the piano parts. However, Martin later stated in a BBC Radio 1 interview with Zane Lowe that he felt that he had "cheated" on the band by asking Avicii to play the piano instead of playing it himself.

== Release ==
On 2 May 2014, "A Sky Full of Stars" was released early through Ghost Stories on the iTunes Store worldwide and on Spotify. On 5 May, the single was released at Google Play store in Australia. On 26 June, Coldplay announced the A Sky Full of Stars EP, which features the radio edit of the song and three bonus tracks from the Target version of Ghost Stories: "All Your Friends", the title track "Ghost Story" and "O (Reprise)". The extended play was then released on 29 June worldwide, with exception of the United States, given that those songs are already available through their exclusive deluxe edition, although in 2021, the EP was made available in the United States on all streaming platforms.

== Packaging ==
The single art for "A Sky Full of Stars" was etched by UK-based, Czech etching artist Mila Fürstová. The artwork continues the motif of artworks in the Ghost Stories album cycle, which feature a scene occurring in a larger, enclosed body. Multiple figures such as angels with wings like of the Ghost Stories artwork, buildings such as a church, and objects such as a maze and a chair, also alluding to those in the Ghost Stories artwork, are depicted encased in a three-dimensional star chart. The artwork is reminiscent of Fürstová's earlier work, Other Skies, which also features various figures, buildings and objects imposed onto a star map.

== Critical reception ==
"A Sky Full of Stars" received generally positive reviews upon release. Carl Williott of Idolator gave the track a positive review, stating: "Quite honestly it sounds more like a Zedd or Avicii offering than a Coldplay one, and it's certainly the loudest and most joyful cut we've heard from the album so far". Melinda Newman of HitFix had similar thoughts, calling the song "the most commercial and dance-y track so far" from the album. Chris De Ville of Stereogum gave "A Sky Full of Stars" an overwhelmingly positive comment, stating that the song is "the most energetic and classically Coldplay song we've heard from the album so far". Chris Martins of Spin magazine also commented relatively positively, writing that "The big-tent EDM offering is pretty satisfying in all of the ways that those things are".

Consequence of Sound wrote that the song "starts off as a heartfelt piano ballad before flourishes of pounding electronics take over the chorus" and noted that it "falls in line with the synth-heavy soundscapes of 'Midnight', but with more danceable flavor." Zane Lowe of BBC Radio 1 named the track his 'Hottest Record' for 29 April 2014. However, a negative review came from Carolyn Menyes of Music Times who criticized the song for "lack[ing] a personality or heart, something that the best Coldplay songs are chock full of". Josh Modell of The A.V. Club panned it as a "blatantly pandering, album-interrupting, mood-f*cking-up [track]".

=== Rankings ===
List of critic rankings
Publication	Year	Description	Result	Ref.
3voor12	2014	Songs of the Year 2014	32	
Glamour	2014	The 22 Best Songs of Summer 2014	15	
iHeartRadio	2019	30 Alternative Rock Songs That Defined the 2010s	Placed	
Jenesaispop	2014	Best Songs 2014	8	
KROQ-FM	2024	Top 500 Songs from the Last 30 Years	345	
NPO Radio 2	2023	Top 2000	68	
Panorama	2014	The 25 Best Songs of 2014	6	

== Chart performance ==
"A Sky Full of Stars" reached number one in more than 70 countries on iTunes during its first day, with over 120,000 units sold. It reached the Top 10 on the official rankings of nearly every country it charted in, including number nine on the UK Singles Chart. In Australia, the song reached number two on the ARIA Charts, becoming Coldplay's highest peak since "Viva la Vida" in 2008. In the week starting 27 November 2023, it returned to the ranking at number 43. "A Sky Full of Stars" has also peaked at number two in New Zealand, making it the band's highest-charting single to date and their fifth top-ten single in the country.

On the chart dating 17 May 2014, the single debuted at number 24 on the US Billboard Hot 100. The following week, the single dropped down to number 43, but then surged up to number 10 the week after, becoming their third top ten hit, as well as their first since "Viva la Vida", which reached number one in 2008. The single would spend a total of 26 weeks on the charts and managed to make the Billboard Hot 100 Year-End list for 2014, where it placed at number 51. It additionally was their first number-one on Hot Rock Songs and second on Hot Dance Club Songs. As of November 2014, "A Sky Full of Stars" has sold over a million digital units in the United States. In June 2024, PPL ranked it as Coldplay's ninth-most played track on British media. A year later, the song was placed at number 403 on the list of most streamed songs of all time on Apple Music.

== Music video ==
Route scheme in the music video

The official music video was directed by Mat Whitecross and the shooting took place on King Street, Newtown, Sydney, on 17 June 2014. It was released on 19 June 2014.

At the beginning of the video, Martin walks down King Street dressed as a one-man band, singing the first verse of the song. Then he reaches the other members of the band (also dressed as one-man bands) and, together, they play the instrumental refrain. Martin is then seen walking through the street, without the other members, while he sings the second verse. At the end of the video the band reunites in a square, singing and playing the final part of the song with a crowd of fans. While Martin is singing the final part, many paper-made stars are blown into the square.

An alternate music video, produced by design studio Artisan, shows the band performing the song in a dark room where an animation of stars is projected onto the floor. The musicians interact with the projection and the stars swirl and fly around following their movements. During an interview, Martin revealed this version was actually the original idea for the music video, but was later scrapped and they decided to shoot a new video in Sydney. However, snippets from the Artisan video were included in the official one and they can be seen playing on the TV screens in a shop's showcase.

== Live performances ==
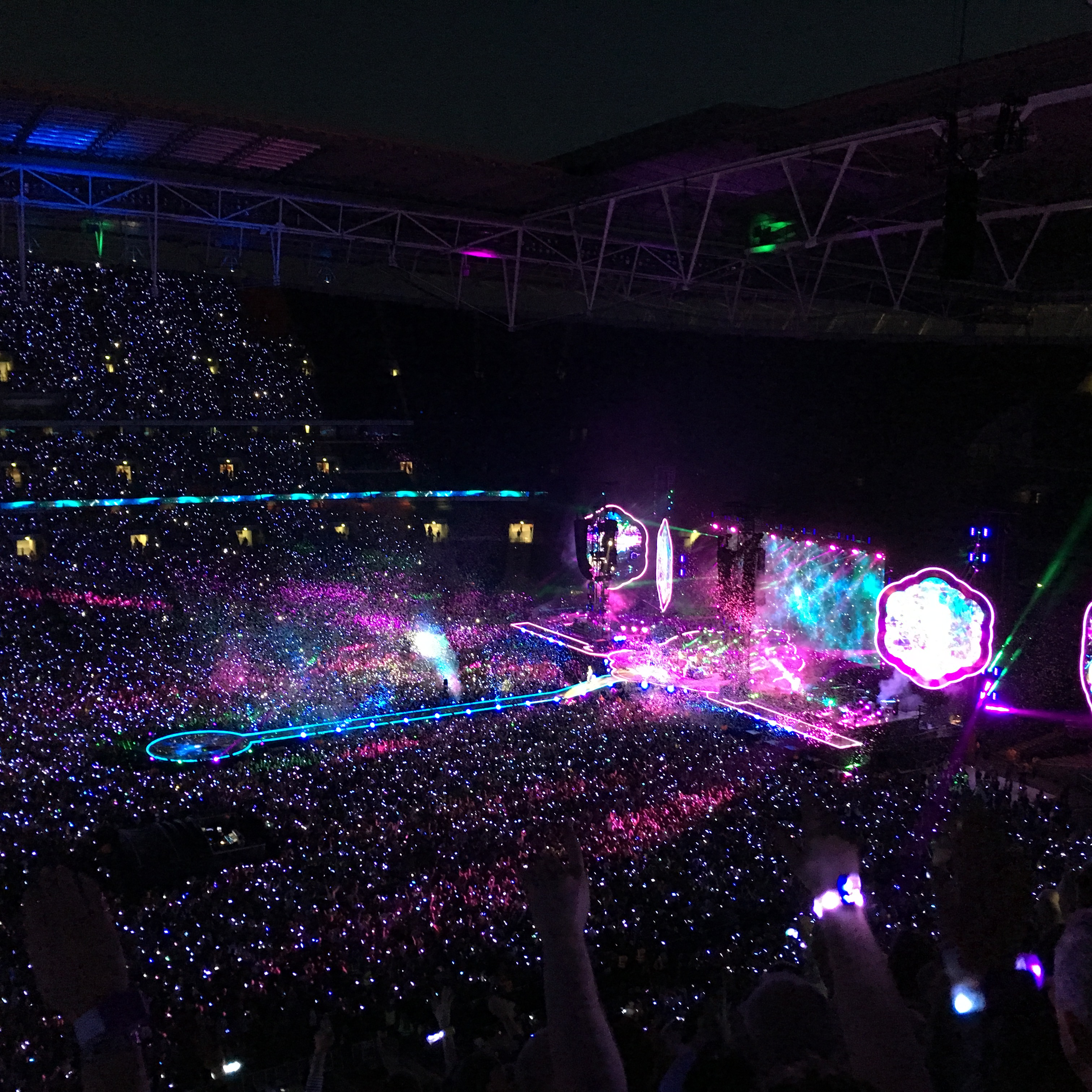
View of the stage at Wembley Stadium, as Coldplay perform "A Sky Full of Stars" during a concert on their A Head Full of Dreams Tour.

"A Sky Full of Stars" was first played in closed-audience performances. The band, when performing the song before the release of the "A Sky Full of Stars" single, would routinely ask the audience not to record their performance of the song, in an attempt to prevent the song from leaking ahead of its release. Despite their intentions, the song was leaked after their performance of the song during the opening night of their Ghost Stories Promotional Tour at E-Werk in Cologne, Germany on 25 April 2014. The song was premiered live on the 29 April 2014 airing of BBC Two music television show Later... with Jools Holland. The band then performed the song on Saturday Night Live on 3 May 2014. The band also performed the song on The Graham Norton Show, in the UK, on 30 May 2014. The band also performed the song at the halftime show of the 2025 FIFA Club World Cup final alongside Emmanuel Kelly.

== In popular culture ==
At the Apple special event 2014 held on September 9 of that year, "A Sky Full of Stars" was the song of choice when the first introduction video unveiled the Apple Watch.

At the 2019 AFC Asian Cup, this song was played after the national anthem of two teams in every matches.

"A Sky Full of Stars" was played during the 2020 Democratic National Convention and after the acceptance speeches of U.S. President Joe Biden and Vice President Kamala Harris following their victory in the 2020 presidential election on November 7, 2020. Dana Bash of CNN noted the significance of the song choice for Biden as it was the favourite song of his late son Beau Biden.

The song was also played during the 3-Point Shootout of the 2015 NBA All-Star Game weekend.

It was also chosen by the players of English football team Liverpool F.C. to play during the celebrations as they lifted the 2019–20 Premier League, their first league title in 30 years.

Taron Egerton performed the song as his character Johnny for the 2021 animated film, Sing 2; the song was also included on the film's soundtrack.

On Paulo Dybala's presentation day at his new club AS Roma in 2022, the song was played in front of massive crowd of Roma fans; it was also previously played during the post-match celebration of Juventus FC after their game against S.S. Lazio – Dybala's final match with the club.

In 2023, American television network CBS, and its sports division CBS Sports, included the song in a six-minute long video tribute to the SEC on CBS that they posted on social media, as the network's contract with the conference expired following the 2023 SEC Championship Game. The tribute video, which also included High Hopes by Panic! at the Disco and Hall of Fame by The Script, later aired during CBS's pregame show.

== Track listing ==
All tracks are written by Chris Martin, Jonny Buckland, Guy Berryman, and Will Champion; "A Sky Full of Stars" additionally written by Avicii.

Digital download – EP
No.	Title	Length
1.	"A Sky Full of Stars" (Radio Edit)	3:56
2.	"All Your Friends"	3:32
3.	"Ghost Story"	4:17
4.	"O" (Reprise)	1:37
Total length:		13:22

Digital download – Hardwell Remix
No.	Title	Length
1.	"A Sky Full of Stars" (Hardwell Remix)	5:13

CD single
No.	Title	Length
1.	"A Sky Full of Stars"	4:28
2.	"Midnight" (Phones 4AM Remix)	10:56
3.	"Midnight" (Henrik Schwarz Remix)	8:42
4.	"Midnight" (Jon Hopkins Remix)	10:06
Total length:		34:12

== Personnel ==
Adapted from Ghost Stories liner notes.

Coldplay

- Chris Martin – lead vocals, acoustic guitar
- Jonny Buckland – lead guitar
- Guy Berryman – bass guitar
- Will Champion – drums, backing vocals, programming

Additional musicians

- Avicii – piano, keyboards

Technical personnel

- Avicii – production
- Paul Epworth – production
- Rik Simpson – production
- Daniel Green – production

Artistic personnel

- Mila Fürstová – artwork

== Charts ==
=== Weekly charts ===
Weekly chart performance
Chart (2014–2026)	Peak position
Argentina Hot 100 (Billboard)	98
Australia (ARIA)	2
Austria (Ö3 Austria Top 40)	11
Belgium (Ultratop 50 Flanders)	2
Belgium Dance (Ultratop Flanders)	10
Belgium (Ultratop 50 Wallonia)	1
Belgium Dance (Ultratop Wallonia)	4
Brazil (Billboard Brasil Hot 100)	52
Canada Hot 100 (Billboard)	4
Canada Rock (Billboard)	38
CIS Airplay (TopHit)	3
Czech Republic Airplay (ČNS IFPI)	4
Czech Republic Singles Digital (ČNS IFPI)	2
Denmark (Tracklisten)	3
Denmark Airplay (Tracklisten)	1
Estonia (Uuno Top 25)	2
Euro Digital Song Sales (Billboard)	3
Finland (Suomen virallinen lista)	8
France (SNEP)	3
Germany (GfK)	6
Global 200 (Billboard)	101
Greece International (IFPI)	9
Hong Kong (Billboard)	16
Hungary (Rádiós Top 40)	2
Hungary (Single Top 40)	2
Iceland (RÚV)	5
India International (IMI)	5
Ireland (IRMA)	3
Israel International Airplay (Media Forest)	1
Italy (FIMI)	1
Italy Airplay (EarOne)	1
Japan Hot 100 (Billboard)	14
Lebanon (The Official Lebanese Top 20)	1
Luxembourg Digital Songs (Billboard)	1
Malaysia (Billboard)	11
Malaysia International (RIM)	13
Malta Airplay (Radiomonitor)	17
Mexico (Billboard Mexican Airplay)	43
Mexico (Billboard Ingles Airplay)	3
Mexico Anglo (Monitor Latino)	18
Netherlands (Dutch Top 40)	6
Netherlands (Single Top 100)	2
New Zealand (Recorded Music NZ)	2
Norway (VG-lista)	15
Poland Airplay (ZPAV)	2
Poland Dance (ZPAV)	25
Portugal (AFP)	21
Portugal Digital Songs (Billboard)	1
Russia Airplay (TopHit)	4
Scottish Singles Sales (Official Charts)	9
Singapore (RIAS)	3
Slovakia Airplay (ČNS IFPI)	5
Slovakia Singles Digital (ČNS IFPI)	2
Slovenia (SloTop50)	3
South Africa Airplay (EMA)	5
South Korea International (Gaon)	10
Spain (Promusicae)	3
Sweden (Sverigetopplistan)	7
Switzerland (Schweizer Hitparade)	2
Taiwan (Billboard)	13
United Arab Emirates (IFPI)	5
UK Singles (Official Charts)	9
Ukraine Airplay (TopHit)	4
US Billboard Hot 100	10
US Adult Contemporary (Billboard)	11
US Adult Pop Airplay (Billboard)	3
US Dance Club Songs (Billboard)	1
US Hot Dance/Electronic Songs (Billboard)	3
US Hot Rock & Alternative Songs (Billboard)	1
US Pop Airplay (Billboard)	13
US Rock & Alternative Airplay (Billboard)	4

=== Monthly charts ===
Monthly chart performance
Chart (2014)	Peak position
South Korea International (Gaon)	23

=== Year-end charts ===
Year-end chart performance
Chart (2014)	Position
Australia (ARIA)	54
Austria (Ö3 Austria Top 40)	53
Belgium (Ultratop Flanders)	11
Belgium (Ultratop Wallonia)	9
Canada (Canadian Hot 100)	58
Denmark (Tracklisten)	42
France (SNEP)	8
Germany (Official German Charts)	33
Hungary (Rádiós Top 40)	12
Hungary (Single Top 40)	21
Israel (Media Forest)	9
Italy (FIMI)	5
Italy Airplay (EarOne)	2
Japan Adult Contemporary (Billboard)	11
Netherlands (Dutch Top 40)	11
Netherlands (Single Top 100)	14
New Zealand (Recorded Music NZ)	47
Poland (ZPAV)	22
Russia Airplay (TopHit)	39
Spain (Promusicae)	16
Sweden (Sverigetopplistan)	35
Switzerland (Schweizer Hitparade)	14
UK Singles (Official Charts Company)	40
US Billboard Hot 100	51
US Adult Contemporary (Billboard)	34
US Adult Top 40 (Billboard)	17
US Hot Dance/Electronic Songs (Billboard)	10
US Rock Airplay (Billboard)	14
US Hot Rock Songs (Billboard)	8

Chart (2015)	Position
CIS (TopHit)	19
France (SNEP)	94
Italy (FIMI)	83
Russia Airplay (TopHit)	17
Slovenia (SloTop50)	41
Spain (Promusicae)	100
Ukraine Airplay (TopHit)	181
US Adult Contemporary (Billboard)	48
US Hot Dance/Electronic Songs (Billboard)	18
US Hot Rock Songs (Billboard)	27

Chart (2018)	Position
Hungary (Rádiós Top 40)	74
Portugal Full Track Download (AFP)	199

Chart (2024)	Position
Portugal (AFP)	181

Chart (2025)	Position
Belgium (Ultratop 50 Flanders)	187
Global 200 (Billboard)	135

=== Decade-end charts ===
Decade-end chart performance
Chart (2010–2019)	Position
Netherlands (Single Top 100)	42
US Hot Rock Songs (Billboard)	37

== Certifications and sales ==
Certifications and sales
Region	Certification	Certified units/sales
Australia (ARIA)	8× Platinum	560,000^{‡}
Austria (IFPI Austria)	Gold	15,000^{‡}
Belgium (BRMA)	2× Platinum	40,000^{‡}
Canada (Music Canada)	3× Platinum	240,000^{‡}
Denmark (IFPI Danmark)	3× Platinum	270,000^{‡}
France (SNEP)	Gold	96,700 (Note: French year-end sales for "A Sky Full of Stars" in 2014.)
Germany (BVMI)	2× Platinum	600,000^{‡}
Italy (FIMI)	5× Platinum	250,000^{‡}
Mexico (AMPROFON)	Platinum	60,000^{*}
New Zealand (RMNZ)	6× Platinum	180,000^{‡}
Portugal (AFP)	5× Platinum	50,000^{‡}
Spain (Promusicae)	4× Platinum	240,000^{‡}
Switzerland (IFPI Switzerland)	Platinum	30,000^{^}
United Kingdom (BPI)	5× Platinum	3,000,000^{‡}
United States (RIAA)	4× Platinum	4,000,000^{‡}
Streaming
Denmark (IFPI Danmark)	Platinum	2,600,000^{†}
Spain (Promusicae)	Platinum	8,000,000^{†}
^{*} Sales figures based on certification alone.^{^} Shipments figures based on certification alone.^{‡} Sales+streaming figures based on certification alone.^{†} Streaming-only figures based on certification alone.

== Release history ==
Release dates and formats
Region	Date	Format	Label	Ref.
Australia	2 May 2014	Digital download	Warner	
Canada	2 May 2014	Digital download	Warner	
France	2 May 2014	Digital download	Warner	
Germany	2 May 2014	Digital download	Warner	
Ireland	2 May 2014	Digital download	Parlophone	
Luxembourg	2 May 2014	Digital download	Warner	
Netherlands	2 May 2014	Digital download	Warner	
New Zealand	2 May 2014	Digital download	Warner	
Spain	2 May 2014	Digital download	Warner	
Switzerland	2 May 2014	Digital download	Warner	
United Kingdom	2 May 2014	Digital download	Parlophone	
United States	2 May 2014	Digital download	Atlantic	
Italy	8 May 2014	Contemporary hit radio	Warner	
United States	27 May 2014	Adult album alternative radio	Atlantic	
United States	10 June 2014	Contemporary hit radio	Atlantic	
Germany	20 June 2014	Compact disc	Warner	
United States	14 July 2014	Digital download (Hardwell remix)	FFRR	

== See also ==
- List of number-one singles of 2014 (Belgium)
- List of number-one hits of 2014 (Italy)
- List of Billboard Hot 100 top-ten singles in 2014
- List of top 10 singles for 2014 in Australia
- List of top 10 singles in 2014 (France)
- List of UK top-ten singles in 2014
