= Magic (Coldplay song) =

2014 single by Coldplay

Single by Coldplay

from the album Ghost Stories
- Released: 3 March 2014
- Recorded: 2013
- Studio: The Bakery (London); The Beehive (London)
- Genre: Pop rock; R&B
- Length: 4:45 (album version); 4:18 (radio edit)
- Label: Parlophone; Atlantic
- Songwriters: Guy Berryman; Jonny Buckland; Will Champion; Chris Martin
- Producers: Coldplay; Paul Epworth; Daniel Green; Rik Simpson

Coldplay singles chronology
"Atlas" (2013)	"Magic" (2014)	"A Sky Full of Stars" (2014)

Music video
- "Magic" on YouTube

"Magic" is a song by British rock band Coldplay from their sixth studio album, Ghost Stories (2014). It was released on 3 March 2014 as the record's lead single, being written and produced by band members Guy Berryman, Jonny Buckland, Will Champion, Chris Martin, while production assistance was provided by Paul Epworth.

== Background and recording ==
The song was recorded by the band during sessions for their sixth studio album in 2013, at their purpose-built studios The Bakery and The Beehive in North London, England, both originally constructed for work on their two previous studio albums, 2008's Viva la Vida or Death and All His Friends and 2011's Mylo Xyloto respectively. The song's bass riff, the first part of the song, was originally conceived by Guy Berryman during the band's recording sessions in February 2013.

The single art for "Magic" was etched by British-based, Czech etching artist Mila Fürstová. The artwork features a symbolic white dove imposed onto a blue background. Much like other artworks of the Ghost Stories album cycle, the image depicts a scenario contained within the perimeter of the subject of focus, this time the white dove. The scenario features imagery related to stage magic, including a levitating couple, a flying deck of cards and a theater stage.

== Composition ==
A beat consisting of a "muffled snare" and "dusty bass riff" is repeated throughout most of the song. As the song progresses, a piano is later added to the instrumentation which is eventually swapped out for a stomp-clap beat and again for a synth beat. Following the song's second chorus, these beats are gradually combined while Martin sings in falsetto. The song's "anticlimactic" portion then decreases intensity until it has eventually resumed to simply a snare and bass riff.

== Critical reception ==
=== Reviews ===
"Magic"
"Magic" features a similar production style to tracks on Mylo Xyloto, yet contrasts with its softer, less "colourful" music.

Jamieson Cox of Time magazine wrote that "Magic" isn't as far from the style of Coldplay's previous albums as "Midnight", the first track from Ghost Stories that was revealed. He added that the single "does hint at a few new tricks up the band's sleeve," and described it as "a successful marriage of old and new". Rolling Stone magazine's Kory Grow commented in similar tone, calling the song "a return to form," proven "to be Coldplay through and through". Digital Spy's Lewis Corner concurred, writing: "[The song] isn't a quick card trick to draw you in like some of the band's previous hits, but rather a long-form spectacle that slowly allures you with its intricacies and delicate craftsmanship."

Writing for Consequence of Sound, Alex Young opined that the track "sounds a lot less Bon Iver and a lot more Chris Martin drinking a venti, no-whip Skinny Vanilla Latte on a Sunday afternoon." Carl Williot of Idolator noted the song's Edge influence and commented that it showed "a tonedown their trademark grandeur in exchange for a more minimalist, atmospheric set of songs." Spin's Kyle McGovern had similar thoughts, and called the track "a low-key meditation on love." Bill Lamb of About.com gave the song 4.5 stars out of 5 and called it a "refreshingly simple, heartwarming love song." Writing for Los Angeles Times, Mikael Wood commented: "With Martin's delicate falsetto floating over a muted drum-machine beat ... this one offers up a sumptuous vocal melody – and a surprisingly soulful one at that".

=== Rankings ===
List of critic rankings
Publication	Year	Description	Result	Ref.
3voor12	2014	Songs of the Year 2014	25	
Billboard	2022	The 50 Best Love Songs of the 21st Century	26	
Mondo Sonoro	2014	The 50 Best International Songs of 2014	43	
NPO Radio 2	2015	Top 2000	438	
Rolling Stone	2014	50 Best Songs of 2014	30	
Smooth Radio	2023	The Top 50 Greatest Songs of the 2010s	25	
Tampa Bay Times	2019	The Best Pop Songs of the 2010s	45	

== Music video ==
=== Background and concept ===
Cecile and Claude argue. The music video mimics early silent films, which used methods such as straightforward cinematography and intertitles to subtitle the otherwise inaudible characters.

A music video for "Magic" was directed by Jonas Åkerlund. Starring Chinese actress Zhang Ziyi, the video pays tribute to silent films, and is based on a literal interpretation of "Magic", with the narrative revolving around an "old-timey magic show". The five-minute music video was premiered on music video hosting service Vevo on 7 April 2014.

The narrative of the music video is centered around a magic show, which was translated by the director from a literal interpretation of Coldplay's song, whose lyrics make allusions to various magic tricks and stunts. The video itself is presented as a monochrome silent film, with cinematography and production mimicking those of the early 20th Century silent films, including an opening credits sequence, with "ragtime jazz", reminiscent of those used in early silent films. The video's narrative has been compared to the 2006 film The Prestige, without the "gripping" elements of the film.

When Jonas Åkerlund was interviewed, he said, despite the silent movie influences of it, the video was set in the present.

=== Synopsis and reception ===
Cecile (Zhang Ziyi) is a stage magician who performs magic in a traveling circus. She performs with Christophe (Chris Martin), a young magician who serves as Cecile's assistant. The duo perform various routine magic acts, such as impalement arts and shapeshifting. Cecile is married to Claude (also played by Chris Martin), a famous magician who, in addition to being an alcoholic, is violently aggressive to his wife. As Christophe continues to perform with Cecile, he starts to notice evidence of Claude's aggressive behavior towards Cecile, including bruises across her arm and witnessing Claude shouting at his wife, reducing her to tears.

Christophe, after he learns the art of levitation, formulates an idea to relieve Cecile of her troubles with Claude. He invites Cecile into the show tent to show her his newly-learnt ability to levitate himself. This however, upsets Claude who, after accusing his wife of cheating on him with Christophe, seeks to challenge him to a fight in one of his alcohol-fueled rampages. Christophe, however, uses his new abilities to levitate Claude and send him flying into the sky, thus saving Cecile from Claude. The two continue the show without Claude and show off new entertaining magic tricks and stunts.

Carl Williott of American music website Idolator wrote positively of the video, stating that it was "a quirky, entertaining video, specifically the parts with Martin playing a goofy-ass villain". Jason Scott of music blog Popdust also wrote positively, describing the music video's imagery as "vivid" and "a literal interpretation of what we've all come to expect from a 1920s side-show attraction". The video was filmed on 4 and 5 February 2014 in Los Angeles State Historic Park and no camera tricks were used.

== Covers and versions ==
In July 2014, R&B artist Brandy released a rerecorded version of "Magic" to her TwitMusic account. The same day, it peaked at number one on Billboard's Trending 140 chart, less than 24 hours after its premiere. Covered in live performances by various artists. In April 2014, singer Aloe Blacc performed the song on BBC Radio 1's Live Lounge. A few days later, You Me at Six covered the song BBC Radio 1's Live Lounge on the same venue. Singer Rita Ora gave a mashup rendition of "Magic" and Beyoncé's "Drunk in Love" at the Radio 1's Big Weekend event in May 2014. In September 2014, Jacob Banks also sang "Magic" on BBC Radio 1's Live Lounge. The song was also covered by singer-songwriter Lauren Aquilina for her own BBC Radio 1 Maida Vale Studios session.

== Track listing ==
Digital download
No.	Title	Writer(s)	Producer(s)	Length
1.	"Magic"	Guy Berryman; Jonny Buckland; Will Champion; Chris Martin	Coldplay; Paul Epworth; Daniel Green; Rik Simpson	4:34

== Personnel ==
Adapted from DR credits.

Coldplay

- Guy Berryman – bass
- Jonny Buckland – guitar, backing vocal
- Will Champion – drums, percussion
- Chris Martin – vocals, acoustic guitar

Additional musicians

- Paul Epworth, Rick Simpson – keyboards

Technical personnel

- Paul Epworth – production
- Rik Simpson – production
- Daniel Green – production

== Charts ==
=== Weekly charts ===
Weekly chart performance
Chart (2014–2023)	Peak position
Australia (ARIA)	5
Austria (Ö3 Austria Top 40)	22
Belgium (Ultratop 50 Flanders)	9
Belgium (Ultratop 50 Wallonia)	7
Brazil (Billboard Brasil Hot 100)	4
Brazil Hot Pop Songs	36
Canada Hot 100 (Billboard)	13
Canada Rock (Billboard)	22
CIS Airplay (TopHit)	162
Czech Republic Airplay (ČNS IFPI)	8
Czech Republic Singles Digital (ČNS IFPI)	8
Denmark (Tracklisten)	5
Finland (Suomen virallinen lista)	7
France (SNEP)	6
Germany (GfK)	14
Greece Digital Songs (Billboard)	5
Hungary (Rádiós Top 40)	37
Hungary (Single Top 40)	7
Iceland (RÚV)	2
Ireland (IRMA)	4
Israel International Airplay (Media Forest)	4
Italy (FIMI)	2
Italy Airplay (EarOne)	7
Japan (Japan Hot 100)	35
Luxemburg Digital Songs (Billboard)	2
Mexico Ingles Airplay (Billboard)	9
Netherlands (Dutch Top 40)	2
Netherlands (Single Top 100)	2
New Zealand (Recorded Music NZ)	10
Norway (VG-lista)	12
Portugal (AFP)	146
Portugal Digital Songs (Billboard)	1
Scottish Singles Sales (Official Charts)	10
Slovakia Airplay (ČNS IFPI)	32
Slovakia Singles Digital (ČNS IFPI)	14
Slovenia (SloTop50)	26
South Korea (Gaon)	143
South Korea International (Gaon)	12
Spain (Promusicae)	3
Sweden (Sverigetopplistan)	21
Switzerland (Schweizer Hitparade)	7
UK Singles (Official Charts)	10
US Billboard Hot 100	14
US Adult Pop Airplay (Billboard)	30
US Hot Rock & Alternative Songs (Billboard)	3
US Rock & Alternative Airplay (Billboard)	6

=== Monthly charts ===
Monthly chart performance
Chart (2014)	Peak position
South Korea International (Gaon)	32

=== Year-end charts ===
Year-end chart performance
Chart (2014)	Position
Australia (ARIA)	36
Belgium (Ultratop Flanders)	34
Belgium (Ultratop Wallonia)	41
Brazil (Crowley)	53
France (SNEP)	62
Germany (Official German Charts)	71
Hungary (Single Top 40)	86
Italy (FIMI)	14
Italy Airplay (EarOne)	45
Japan Adult Contemporary (Billboard)	82
Netherlands (Dutch Top 40)	16
Netherlands (Single Top 100)	16
Sweden (Sverigetopplistan)	81
Switzerland (Schweizer Hitparade)	32
Taiwan (Hito Radio)	26
UK Singles (Official Charts Company)	61
US Hot Rock Songs (Billboard)	15
US Adult Alternative Songs (Billboard)	10
US Alternative Songs (Billboard)	25
US Rock Airplay (Billboard)	25

Chart (2016)	Position
Brazil (Brasil Hot 100)	97

=== Decade-end charts ===
Decade-end chart performance
Chart	Position
Netherlands (Single Top 100)	66

=== All-time charts ===
All-time chart performance
Chart	Position
Netherlands Love Songs (Dutch Top 40)	21

== Certifications and sales ==
Certifications and sales
Region	Certification	Certified units/sales
Australia (ARIA)	4× Platinum	280,000^{‡}
Belgium (BRMA)	Platinum	20,000^{‡}
Canada (Music Canada)	Platinum	80,000^{‡}
France	—	38,900 (Note: French year-end sales for "Magic" in 2014.)
Italy (FIMI)	3× Platinum	90,000^{‡}
New Zealand (RMNZ)	Platinum	15,000^{*}
Portugal (AFP)	Platinum	20,000^{‡}
Spain (Promusicae)	Platinum	60,000^{‡}
Switzerland (IFPI Switzerland)	Gold	15,000^{^}
United Kingdom (BPI)	Platinum	709,000 (Note: British total sales for "Magic" as of November 2018.)
United States (RIAA)	Platinum	1,000,000^{‡}
Streaming
Denmark (IFPI Danmark)	Platinum	2,600,000^{†}
Spain (Promusicae)	Platinum	8,000,000^{†}
^{*} Sales figures based on certification alone.^{^} Shipments figures based on certification alone.^{‡} Sales+streaming figures based on certification alone.^{†} Streaming-only figures based on certification alone.

== Release history ==
Release dates and formats
Region	Date	Format	Label	Ref.
Australia	3 March 2014	Digital download	Parlophone	
France	3 March 2014	Digital download	Parlophone	
United States	3 March 2014	Digital download	Parlophone	
Italy	3 March 2014	Contemporary hit radio	Parlophone	
United States	10 March 2014	Adult album alternative	Atlantic	

== See also ==
- List of top 10 singles for 2014 in Australia
- List of top 10 singles in 2014 (France)
- List of UK top-ten singles in 2014
- List of Billboard number-one adult alternative singles of the 2010s
