= Midnight (Coldplay song) =

2014 single by Coldplay

Promotional single by Coldplay

from the album Ghost Stories
- Released: 17 April 2014
- Recorded: 2013
- Studio: The Bakery (London); The Beehive (London)
- Genre: Ambient; folktronica
- Length: 4:54 (album version); 3:27 (radio edit)
- Label: Parlophone; Atlantic
- Songwriters: Guy Berryman; Jonny Buckland; Will Champion; Jon Hopkins; Chris Martin
- Producers: Coldplay; Paul Epworth; Daniel Green; Jon Hopkins; Rik Simpson

Music video
- "Midnight" on YouTube

"Midnight" is a song by British rock band Coldplay for their sixth studio album, Ghost Stories (2014). It was written and produced by band members Guy Berryman, Jonny Buckland, Will Champion and Chris Martin, with production assistance from Paul Epworth, Daniel Green, and Rik Simpson, and co-production from Jon Hopkins, who also received songwriting credits. A music video was released on 25 February 2014 as teaser for the then-unannounced album, while a promotional 7-inch vinyl single was pressed by Parlophone for Record Store Day on 17 April 2014.

== Composition ==
"Midnight" has been described as an ambient and folktronica song. It was built over a previously unreleased original track produced by Jon Hopkins in 2003. The track, named "Amphora", was never completed by Hopkins and was partly released by ambient/electronic music blog A Strangely Isolated Place on SoundCloud in early 2012, as part of their playlist "ASIP - 1.00.00". The song also incorporates elements from a Jon Hopkins recording titled by Hopkins as "The Fourth State II", a reproduction of his 2008 extended play The Fourth Estate.

== Recording ==
The song was recorded by the band during sessions for their sixth studio album in 2013, at their purpose-built studios The Bakery and The Beehive in North London, England, both originally constructed for work on their two previous studio albums, 2008's Viva la Vida or Death and All His Friends and 2011's Mylo Xyloto respectively. Chris Martin's recorded vocals for the song were put through a vocoder.

== Reception ==
"Midnight"
Sample of "Midnight" from Coldplay's 2014 album Ghost Stories.

"Midnight" received generally positive reviews from critics, who noted a change in the sound of the band and drew comparisons to Bon Iver and Justin Vernon. Al Horner of NME approved of the band's new musical direction and lauded the song as a "dive into icy electronic experimentalism". Contactmusic.com's Lauren James similarly praised the song, writing: "gone are the crashing pianos, guitar and soaring vocals of the Brit rockers' more famous ballads, replaced with a pared back, minimalist electronic song". Micahel Nelson of Stereogum concurred, commenting that the song brought out Coldplay "at their most spacious and ambient, stripped down to a ghostly essence". Writing for PopMatters, Evan Sawdey rated the song 8/10 and summarized it as "chilly, moody, and evocative". Rolling Stone's Cory Grow compared Martin's vocals to Peter Gabriel "as he sings about darkness, while the synths build throughout the track before a skittery, rave-like keyboard line flits about noisy static". Idolator's Carl Williot described the song as "a haunting electronic soundscape that not only lacks the band's trademark anthemic choruses and stadium-filling guitar lines, but boasts nary a hook and has few decipherable lyrics". Lewis Corner of Digital Spy opined that the song was "subdued, murky, twinkling, but definitely not lead single material on first listen" and hailed the band for "never fail[ing] to shake up their sound and become even more successful with it". Jamieson Cox of Time magazine felt the song "never blossoms into one of Coldplay's trademark climaxes, instead blurring into a phosphene cloud of synth melodies" but praised it for being "another step in a new direction for a band that's never been content with staying in place".

== Promotion ==
The music video for "Midnight" was noted for its use of night vision filters.

A 5-minute music video for "Midnight", directed by Mary Wigmore, was premiered on music video hosting service Vevo at 6pm UTC (Midnight in Ulaanbaatar, Mongolia time), on 25 February 2014. The video was shot nearly in its entirety in thermal infrared imaging and negative imagery, incorporating various visual effects. The thermal infrared camera was a FLIR SC8303 with either a 25 or a 50mm prime lens, depending on the shot. The lenses were made by Janos Corporation. The wavelength range is 3 to 5 microns, or mid wave infrared. The thermal infrared video was recorded as HD-SDI on an Atomos Samurai Blade with a 480 GB solid state hard drive. Simultaneously, raw digital video was captured at 30 frames per second into FLIR ExaminIR software. The video was watched over 1 million times in less than 24 hours after it was posted on their Facebook page. Just two days later it reached 3 million views, later passing 31 million views by 24 June 2015.

"Midnight" was first performed live by Coldplay on the opening night of the 2014 iTunes Festival at SXSW on 12 March 2014 at the Moody Theater in Austin, Texas. It was performed as the only song during the encore segment of the setlist. Bassist Guy Berryman played the laser harp and Will Champion a Reactable.

The song was featured on the Syfy TV series The Shannara Chronicles in the first episode of the first season of the show. The song was featured also on the drama TV series Under the Dome in the seventh episode of the show's second season. The song was also used for the Exodus: Gods and Kings theatrical trailer, as well as in the second episode of the first season of the BBC TV series Our Girl.

== Giorgio Moroder remix ==
A remix of "Midnight" by dance music producer Giorgio Moroder was released by Parlophone on 21 April 2014 for digital download. It received positive reviews from music critics. Kory Grow of the Rolling Stone magazine wrote that Moroder turned an understated EDM track into a "dance floor banger" and "eight-minute affair with no time squandered": "One of Coldplay's most unassuming tracks off their forthcoming record Ghost Stories is now its most danceable". He also commented that the producer "adds a pounding bass-drum beat from the onset and then uses the synth filigrees toward the end of the track ... to build it into something that would have once backed Summer. Vocal 'aahs' and soft pads of synths, alongside robotic chanting in French, make the track more Moroder than Martin for the final four minutes".

Mikael Wood of the Los Angeles Times wrote in similar tone, "The producer's lengthy reworking, which climaxes in a surging synth fantasia complete with robot voices, adds some verve to Coldplay's rather sedate original". Tom Breihan of Stereogum noted that while the remix "might not have the same spacey majesty as peak Moroder, it still does a nice job translating the inward sweep of the original track into an orchestral disco pulse". According to Ryan Kristobak of The Huffington Post, Moroder transformed "Midnight" into "a dance-floor hit, without abandoning the song's Brian Eno/Bon Iver-influenced ambience". Idolator's Robbie Daw commented, "Here Moroder lays a hypnotic click-click-click disco beat below the Kid A-esque atmosphere of the track, and the whole thing eventually builds into a tornado of majestic synths and menacing piano chords. And, of course, no modern day remix by Giorgio Moroder would be complete without the addition of his own ghostly robot vocals".

== Track listing ==
7" and digital download
No.	Title	Length
1.	"Midnight"	4:54

"Midnight (Giorgio Moroder Remix)" was released digitally in April 2014. Three other remixes are included on "A Sky Full of Stars" CD single released in June 2014.

"Midnight (Remixes)"
No.	Title	Length
1.	"Midnight" (Phones 4AM Remix)	10:56
2.	"Midnight" (Henrik Schwarz Remix)	8:41
3.	"Midnight" (Giorgio Moroder Remix)	8:37
4.	"Midnight" (Jon Hopkins Remix)	10:05

== Personnel ==
Adapted from "Midnight" liner notes.

Coldplay

- Guy Berryman – synth bass
- Jonny Buckland – keyboard, piano
- Will Champion – percussion, reactable
- Chris Martin – vocals, keyboard, vocoder

Technical personnel

- Jon Hopkins – production
- Paul Epworth – production
- Rik Simpson – production
- Daniel Green – production
- Ted Jensen – mastering
- Mark Stent – mixing
- Geoff Swan – mixing

Artistic personnel

- Mila Fürstová – artwork

== Charts ==
=== Weekly charts ===
Weekly chart performance
Chart (2014)	Peak position
Australia (ARIA)	25
Austria (Ö3 Austria Top 40)	26
Belgium (Ultratop 50 Flanders)	8
Belgium (Ultratop 50 Wallonia)	1
Canada Hot 100 (Billboard)	27
Denmark (Tracklisten)	3
France (SNEP)	5
Germany (GfK)	44
Hungary (Single Top 40)	1
Italy (FIMI)	2
Luxembourg Digital Songs (Billboard)	1
Netherlands (Dutch Top 40 Tipparade)	16
Netherlands (Single Top 100)	8
New Zealand (Recorded Music NZ)	11
Portugal Digital Songs (Billboard)	1
Spain (Promusicae)	3
Switzerland (Schweizer Hitparade)	20
UK Singles (Official Charts)	48
US Billboard Hot 100	29
US Hot Rock & Alternative Songs (Billboard)	6

=== Year-end charts ===
Year-end chart performance
Chart (2014)	Position
Hungary (Single Top 40)	68
US Hot Rock Songs (Billboard)	40

== Certifications ==
Certifications
Region	Certification	Certified units/sales
Italy (FIMI)	Gold	15,000^{‡}
New Zealand (RMNZ)	Gold	15,000^{‡}
United Kingdom (BPI)	Silver	200,000^{‡}
^{‡} Sales+streaming figures based on certification alone.

== Release history ==
Release dates and formats
Region	Date	Format	Label	Ref.
Poland	17 April 2014	7"	Warner	
United Kingdom	19 April 2014	7"	Parlophone	
Canada	29 April 2014	Digital download	Warner	
France	29 April 2014	Digital download	Warner	
Germany	29 April 2014	Digital download	Warner	
Luxembourg	29 April 2014	Digital download	Warner	
Netherlands	29 April 2014	Digital download	Warner	
New Zealand	29 April 2014	Digital download	Warner	
Spain	29 April 2014	Digital download	Warner	
Sweden	29 April 2014	Digital download	Warner	
Switzerland	29 April 2014	Digital download	Warner	
United Kingdom	29 April 2014	Digital download	Parlophone	
United States	29 April 2014	Digital download	Atlantic	
United States	12 May 2014	Digital download (remixes)	FFRR	

== See also ==
- List of number-one singles of 2014 (Belgium)
- List of top 10 singles in 2014 (France)
