= Tokyo Dome City Hall =

Event facility in Tokyo, Japan

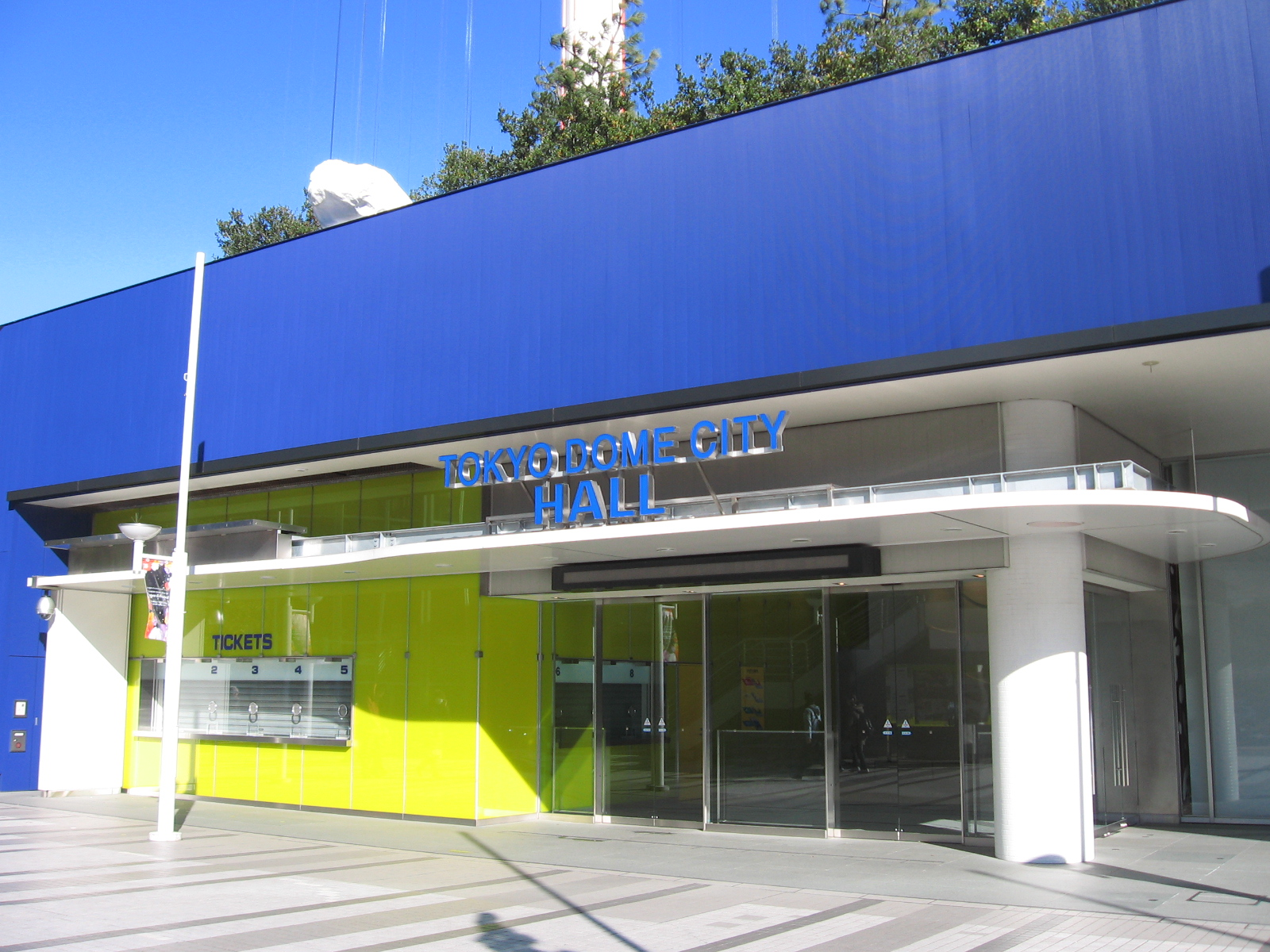
- Interactive map of Tokyo Dome City Hall
- Location: Bunkyo, Tokyo, Japan
- Coordinates: 35°42′10.91″N 139°45′17.27″E
- Owner: Tokyo Dome Corporation
- Capacity: 3,100

Construction
- Opened: March 19, 2008

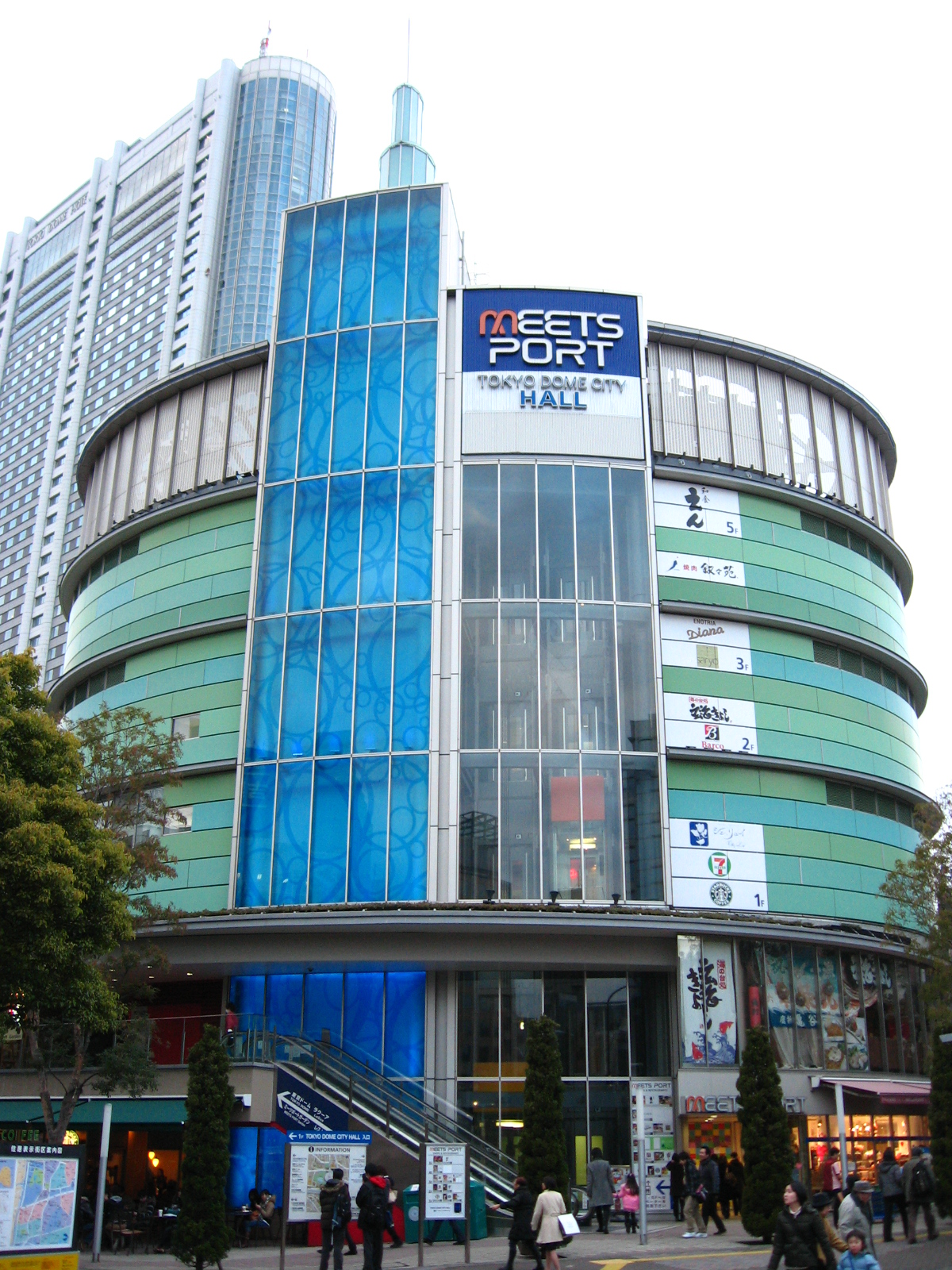
Tokyo Dome City Hall is in the basement of Meets Port

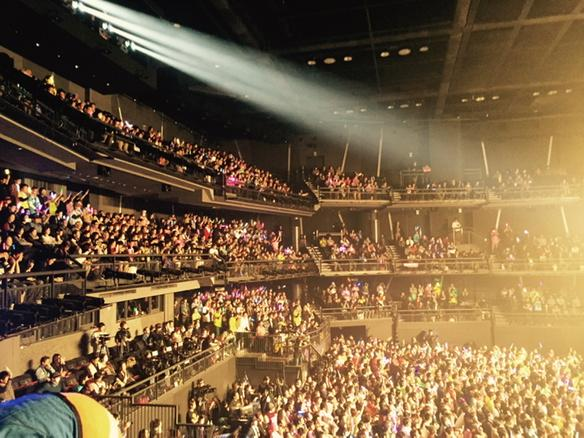
The interior of Tokyo Dome City Hall during a concert

The Tokyo Dome City Hall (TDC Hall) is a facility for sports, fashion shows, circuses, and live music, located inside Tokyo Dome City in Tokyo, Japan. It is on the opposite corner of the Tokyo Dome, and hosts a variety of events at any given time. When the naming rights to the hall were held by Japan Credit Bureau (JCB) between March 19, 2008 to March 30, 2011, it was officially known as JCB Hall, and from April 1, 2025 onward, the facility is officially named Kanadevia Hall for sponsorship reasons with Japanese engineering company Kanadevia.

Tokyo Dome City Hall is part of a larger commercial complex that is named Meets Port. The hall is the underground portion of the Meets Port building, and it is the primary location for most of the larger live events.

== Facilities ==
Standing, Tokyo Dome City Hall can fit approximately 3,100 people, though this number varies depending on the seating charts for the different events. For example, the stage is set in such a way that during fashion shows it seats less than 1600. At the time of opening, TDC Hall had a "state-of-the-art" sound system, complete with a sound absorbing acoustic wall. The seats in the complex are designed for comfort as well. The stage is set up in such a way that it is extremely versatile, and can be switched out depending on the event. For example, when the circus is playing they tend to use a circle stage, but when a concert is playing the stage is converted into a rectangular shape. When a boxing match is taking place, the back of the stage can be removed in order to seat extra chairs. There are also a variety of food choices available on multiple floors of the complex.

== Notable events ==
Although major sporting events take place at the Tokyo Dome, TDC Hall is considered one of the primary spots in Tokyo Dome City for smaller scale sporting events, like boxing, pro-wrestling, Lethwei and some mixed martial arts. It is also the site of small scale circuses.

Many bands/artists have played the venue, including Coldplay in 2014, for one of the dates on their Ghost Stories Tour. It is host to the Animax Anison Grand Prix music competition. It has also hosted the Miss International Japan beauty pageant and the Tougeki – Super Battle Opera video game tournament several times.

== Access ==
The hall is near the stations on the JR Chuo-Sobu Line, the Toei Mita Line, the Marunouchi Line and the Nanboku Line.

== Location ==
Address (English):

- 1-3-61, Koraku, Bunkyo-ku, Tokyo, 112-8575, Japan

Address (Japanese):

- 〒112-8575 東京都文京区後楽1-3-61
