= Live in Buenos Aires (Coldplay album) =

2018 live album by Coldplay

Live album by Coldplay
- Released: 7 December 2018
- Recorded: 14–15 November 2017
- Venues: Estadio Ciudad de La Plata, La Plata (Live in Buenos Aires); Allianz Parque, São Paulo (Live in São Paulo)
- Studio: The Beehive (London)
- Length: 114:21 (live album); 120:04 (video album); 104:35 (documentary)
- Labels: Parlophone; Atlantic
- Producer: Rik Simpson

Coldplay chronology
Global Citizen – EP 1 (2018)	Live in Buenos Aires (2018)	Everyday Life (2019)

The Butterfly Package cover
- The Butterfly Package artwork

Live in Buenos Aires is the fifth live album by British rock band Coldplay. It was recorded on 14 and 15 November 2017 in La Plata, the final concerts of the A Head Full of Dreams Tour. The release happened on 7 December 2018 along with Live in São Paulo, which was filmed on 7 and 8 November 2017. They are assembled into the band's ninth compilation, The Butterfly Package, a set that also includes the Coldplay: A Head Full of Dreams film, a career-spanning documentary directed by Mat Whitecross. This release marked the first time one of the band's concerts was released in full.

== Packaging ==
Icelandic artist Kristjana S. Williams was responsible for creating the package's artwork. It was made available as a two-DVD/two-CD set and a two-DVD/three gold vinyl set, both of them are labelled as The Butterfly Package. A two-CD set featuring Live in Buenos Aires on its own was also made available along with a download and streaming release. The Live in São Paulo film, on the other hand, can only be downloaded or bought as part of the compilation album.

== Promotion ==
The band had announced the release of the A Head Full of Dreams documentary in mid-October. The following week, the set was announced by the band on social media with a clip of them performing "Viva la Vida", on November 2 live performance of "Fix You" and on November 29, "A Head Full of Dreams" To promote the premiere of A Head Full of Dreams on Amazon Prime Video, Coldplay premiered three live tracks through Amazon Music from 26 October: "Stayin' Alive" (live at Glastonbury) with Barry Gibb; "Us Against the World" (live in Leipzig) and "Don't Panic" (live in Paris).

== Controversy ==
The newspaper El Día of La Plata, the city where the concert took place in Argentina, questioned the album's/video's title for including the city name Buenos Aires, which is located a distant 60 kilometers away from La Plata. According to the article, "Although for many this situation is a trifle, for others it is a great disappointment when their idols do not name their city, especially after years and years of having crossed the highway to go see these great events. That's why the disappointment, being local, is greater, they feel ignored".

== Commercial performance ==
Live in Buenos Aires debuted at number 15 on the UK Albums Chart, with 22,097 units sold. In the United States, the record entered the Billboard 200 at number 128. In Japan, it reached number 47 with 2,080 physical copies. Love in Tokyo, an associated release, debuted at number 52 with 2,617 physical copies on the same week.

== Track listing ==
All tracks written by Coldplay (Guy Berryman, Jonny Buckland, Will Champion, and Chris Martin), except where noted.

2 CDs / digital download

Live in Buenos Aires – CD 1 track listing
No.	Title	Original album	Length
1.	"A Head Full of Dreams"	A Head Full of Dreams	4:59
2.	"Yellow"	Parachutes	5:50
3.	"Every Teardrop Is a Waterfall" (Coldplay · Brian Eno · Peter Allen · Adrienne Anderson)	Mylo Xyloto	4:04
4.	"The Scientist"	A Rush of Blood to the Head	6:28
5.	"God Put a Smile upon Your Face"	A Rush of Blood to the Head	4:34
6.	"Paradise"	Mylo Xyloto	6:59
7.	"Always in My Head"	Ghost Stories	3:41
8.	"Magic"	Ghost Stories	4:45
9.	"Everglow"	A Head Full of Dreams	4:55
10.	"Clocks"	A Rush of Blood to the Head	4:20
11.	"Midnight" (Coldplay · Jon Hopkins)	Ghost Stories	1:45
12.	"Charlie Brown"	Mylo Xyloto	5:46
Total length:			57:07

Live in Buenos Aires – CD 2 track listing
No.	Title	Original album	Length
1.	"Hymn for the Weekend"	A Head Full of Dreams	5:03
2.	"Fix You"	X&Y	5:27
3.	"Viva la Vida"	Viva la Vida or Death and All His Friends	4:11
4.	"Adventure of a Lifetime" (Coldplay · Mikkel Eriksen · Tor Hermansen)	A Head Full of Dreams	5:06
5.	"De Música Ligera" (Gustavo Cerati · Zeta Bosio) (covering Soda Stereo)	Canción Animal	6:09
6.	"Colour Spectrum"	A Head Full of Dreams	1:57
7.	"In My Place"	A Rush of Blood to the Head	4:37
8.	"Amor Argentina"		5:16
9.	"Something Just like This" (Coldplay · Andrew Taggart)	Memories...Do Not Open · Kaleidoscope EP	4:04
10.	"A Sky Full of Stars" (Coldplay · Tim Bergling)	Ghost Stories	4:36
11.	"Up&Up"	A Head Full of Dreams	8:45
12.	"End Credits"		2:03
Total length:			57:14

Live in São Paulo – DVD 1 track listing
No.	Title	Original album	Length
1.	"A Head Full of Dreams"	A Head Full of Dreams
2.	"Yellow"	Parachutes
3.	"Every Teardrop Is a Waterfall" (Coldplay · Eno · Allen · Anderson)	Mylo Xyloto
4.	"The Scientist"	A Rush of Blood to the Head
5.	"Birds"	A Head Full of Dreams
6.	"Paradise"	Mylo Xyloto
7.	"Always in My Head"	Ghost Stories
8.	"Magic"	Ghost Stories
9.	"Everglow"	A Head Full of Dreams
10.	"Clocks"	A Rush of Blood to the Head
11.	"Midnight" (Coldplay · Hopkins)	Ghost Stories
12.	"Charlie Brown"	Mylo Xyloto
13.	"Hymn for the Weekend"	A Head Full of Dreams
14.	"Fix You"	X&Y
15.	"Viva la Vida"	Viva la Vida or Death and All His Friends
16.	"Adventure of a Lifetime" (Coldplay · Eriksen · Hermansen)	A Head Full of Dreams
17.	"Colour Spectrum"	A Head Full of Dreams
18.	"Us Against the World"	Mylo Xyloto
19.	"In My Place"	A Rush of Blood to the Head
20.	"Paulistanos"
21.	"Something Just Like This" (Coldplay · Taggart)	Memories...Do Not Open · Kaleidoscope EP
22.	"A Sky Full of Stars" (Coldplay · Bergling)	Ghost Stories
23.	"Up&Up"	A Head Full of Dreams
24.	"End Credits"
Total length:			120:04

Documentary – DVD 2
No.	Title	Length
1.	"Coldplay: A Head Full of Dreams"
Total length:		104:35

== Personnel ==
- Guy Berryman – bass guitar, keyboard, backing vocals
- Jonny Buckland – electric guitar, keyboard, backing vocals
- Will Champion – drums, electronic drums, backing vocals, percussion, acoustic guitar, piano; lead vocals on "In My Place"
- Chris Martin – lead vocals, keyboards, acoustic guitar, piano; backing vocals on "In My Place"

== Charts ==
=== Weekly charts ===
Weekly chart performance
Chart (2018–2023)	Peak position
Argentine Albums (CAPIF)	1
Australian Albums (ARIA)	7
Austrian Albums (Ö3 Austria)	8
Belgian Albums (Ultratop Flanders)	2
Belgian Albums (Ultratop Wallonia)	3
Canadian Albums (Billboard)	66
Croatian International Albums (HDU)	1
Czech Albums (ČNS IFPI)	17
Danish Albums (Hitlisten)	38
Dutch Albums (Album Top 100)	2
French Albums (SNEP)	16
German Albums (Offizielle Top 100)	5
Irish Albums (IRMA)	15
Italian Albums (FIMI)	9
Japanese Albums (Oricon)	47
Japanese Hot Albums (Billboard Japan)	46
New Zealand Albums (RMNZ)	30
Norwegian Albums (VG-lista)	21
Polish Albums (ZPAV)	38
Portuguese Albums (AFP)	4
Scottish Albums (Official Charts)	15
Slovak Albums (ČNS IFPI)	33
Spanish Albums (Promusicae)	8
Swedish Albums (Sverigetopplistan)	33
Swiss Albums (Schweizer Hitparade)	4
UK Albums (Official Charts)	15
US Billboard 200	128
US Top Alternative Albums (Billboard)	9
US Top Rock Albums (Billboard)	18

Weekly chart performance (Love in Tokyo)
Chart (2018)	Peak position
Japanese Albums (Oricon)	52
Japanese Hot Albums (Billboard Japan)	67

=== Monthly charts ===
Monthly chart performance
Chart (2018)	Peak position
Czech Albums (ČNS IFPI)	31
Slovak Albums (ČNS IFPI)	56

=== Year-end charts ===
Year-end chart performance
Chart (2018)	Position
Belgian Albums (Ultratop Flanders)	170
Belgian Albums (Ultratop Wallonia)	114
French Albums (SNEP)	157
Portuguese Albums (AFP)	47
Spanish Albums (Promusicae)	97

Chart (2019)	Position
Belgian Albums (Ultratop Flanders)	111
Belgian Albums (Ultratop Wallonia)	119
Croatian International Albums (HDU)	38
German Albums (Offizielle Top 100)	89
Portuguese Albums (AFP)	61
Spanish Albums (Promusicae)	84

Chart (2020)	Position
Australian Albums (ARIA)	86

Chart (2021)	Position
Australian Albums (ARIA)	69

Chart (2022)	Position
Australian Albums (ARIA)	47

Chart (2023)	Position
Australian Albums (ARIA)	46

== Certifications and sales ==
Certifications and sales
Region	Certification	Certified units/sales
France (SNEP) Live in Buenos Aires	Platinum	100,000^{‡}
Japan Live in Buenos Aires	—	3,766 (Note: Japanese physical sales for Live in Buenos Aires as of January 2019.)
Japan Love in Tokyo	—	2,617 (Note: Japanese physical sales for Love in Tokyo as of December 2018.)
United Kingdom (BPI) The Butterfly Package	Silver	60,000^{‡}
^{‡} Sales+streaming figures based on certification alone.
