= A Head Full of Dreams =

2015 album by Coldplay

- Standard edition cover

Studio album by Coldplay
- Released: 4 December 2015
- Recorded: December 2014 – August 2015
- Studios: Henson (Hollywood); The Village Recorder (Los Angeles); Woodshed (Malibu); AIR (London); The Bakery (London); The Beehive (London)
- Genres: Pop; pop rock; alternative rock
- Length: 45:45
- Labels: Parlophone; Atlantic
- Producers: Stargate; Rik Simpson; Dan Green; Digital Divide

Coldplay chronology
Ghost Stories Live 2014 (2014)	A Head Full of Dreams (2015)	Kaleidoscope EP (2017)

Singles from A Head Full of Dreams
- 1. "Adventure of a Lifetime" Released: 6 November 2015; 2. "Hymn for the Weekend" Released: 25 January 2016; 3. "Up&Up" Released: 22 April 2016; 4. "A Head Full of Dreams" Released: 19 August 2016; 5. "Everglow" Released: 11 November 2016

A Head Full of Dreams is the seventh studio album by British rock band Coldplay. It was released on 4 December 2015 by Parlophone in the United Kingdom and by Atlantic in the United States. Coldplay began recording the album shortly after the completion of Ghost Stories, which had a markedly different style and sound from its predecessors. The band collaborated with Rik Simpson and Stargate to produce the songs. Features include Beyoncé, Noel Gallagher, Tove Lo and Merry Clayton.

A Head Full of Dreams received generally mixed reviews from critics. However, it was a commercial success. The album topped the UK Albums Chart and peaked at number two in the United States, Australia, Canada, and Italy, where it was held off the top spot by Adele's 25. At the 2016 Brit Awards the album was nominated for British Album of the Year.

According to the International Federation of the Phonographic Industry (IFPI), it was the eighth-best-selling album of 2015, as well as the ninth-best-selling of 2016. The album has sold more than six million copies as of June 2018. It was supported by five singles: "Adventure of a Lifetime", "Hymn for the Weekend", "Up&Up", the title track, and "Everglow". A 5.1 Surround Blu-ray Audio version of the album was released via the band's website on 23 September 2016.

The album was promoted by the successful A Head Full of Dreams Tour, that lasted nearly two years. The following year after the tour's conclusion, the band released Live in Buenos Aires, which was recorded on the final two nights of the tour in La Plata, Buenos Aires. A concert film and a documentary were also included in a deluxe edition of the CD. A second live album entitled Love In Tokyo was also released as a Japanese exclusive album which featured recordings from multiple legs of the tour.

== Background ==
Coldplay began working on A Head Full of Dreams in late 2014 after promoting their sixth album Ghost Stories. The album has a markedly different style and sound from its predecessors. In an interview with Radio 2 DJ Jo Whiley in December 2014, guitarist Jonny Buckland and bass guitarist Guy Berryman gave a hint as to the difference between A Head Full of Dreams and its predecessor – Buckland called it the "night to the day", comparing the style of Ghost Stories to the expected uplifting theme of A Head Full of Dreams. Lead singer Chris Martin hinted at the style of the album by saying that the band was trying to make something colourful and uplifting. He also stated that it would be something to "shuffle your feet" to.

On 26 September 2015, the band performed at the Global Citizen Festival 2015 in New York City, playing a six-song set, including a new song called "Amazing Day". The band's producer Rik Simpson confirmed that the song would be on the new album. The album was produced by Rik Simpson and Norwegian duo Stargate. Mixing duties were carried out predominately by Rik Simpson, while Stargate executive produced the album.

== Promotion ==
=== Tour ===
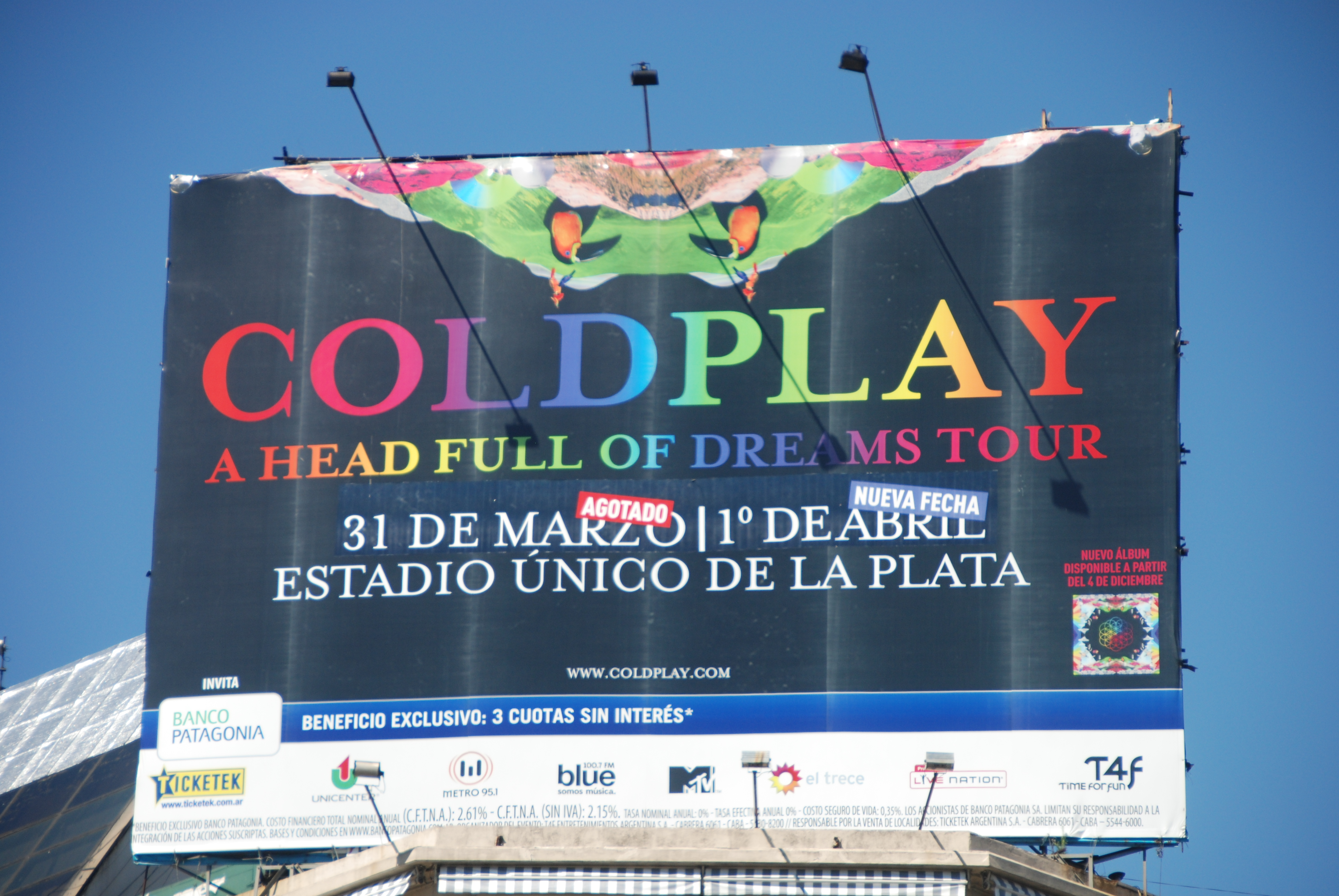
Promotional outdoor for A Head Full of Dreams Tour, in Buenos Aires, Argentina.

Compared to the sparse tour dates of the Ghost Stories era, Coldplay announced a larger global tour soon after the album release, which was more reminiscent of the Mylo Xyloto Tour than the Ghost Stories Tour, to promote both A Head Full of Dreams and Ghost Stories. The band performed in locations such as India and South America – more specifically Argentina, Peru, Brazil, Chile, Colombia and Mexico in the first half of 2016. They have since confirmed that pre-production on the tour has started and that the official tour is planned to start next year. On 20 November 2015, they announced the A Head Full of Dreams Tour, with shows in South America starting on 31 March 2016, Buenos Aires and a European leg were also announced for summer 2016, including four sold-out nights at Wembley Stadium in June. In February, the band featured a picture on various social media sites of a hot air balloon (a symbol used to promote the tour) by Glastonbury farms' main pyramid stage field, along with the date Sunday 26 June. Glastonbury organisers have since confirmed a record-breaking fourth headline appearance, having previously performed on the stage in 2000, 2002, 2005 and 2011. The band's appearance was then confirmed to be Coldplay's festival show of this year's tour. On 30 September 2016, after the huge success of 2016's A Head Full of Dreams Tour, Coldplay announced a new leg of the tour with dates in Germany, France, Austria, Poland, Belgium, Sweden, Italy, Ireland and Wales. On 7 October 2016, the band announced eighteen more shows in North America beginning in Aug 2017 and finishing in October. On 15 November 2016, they announced shows in Asia for April 2017, visiting Singapore, Philippines, Thailand, Taiwan, South Korea, and Japan.

=== Poster and artwork ===
Around 29 October 2015 anonymous posters were pinned up on the London Underground showing a geometric pattern, known as the Flower of Life, along with a note "December 4". Coldplay fans claimed that the symbol resembled the design on a T-shirt worn by Coldplay frontman Chris Martin at the Global Citizen Festival in New York. On 2 November, Coldplay posted the same piece of artwork as an animated GIF on their Twitter account, seemingly confirming that it would be the album cover and 4 December was the album's release date. One day later, they published another animated image of which the former was a detailed view. The artwork was created by Argentine artist Pilar Zeta in collaboration with the band. Oli Sykes, lead singer of British post-hardcore band Bring Me the Horizon, suggested that the flower of life symbol Coldplay used was similar to that of the design of Bring Me the Horizon's 2013 album Sempiternal. Sykes took to Twitter accusing Coldplay of "jackin our steez". He did however clarify in a NME interview that the "flower of life" is a universal symbol and has meanings across the world, none of which he owns the rights to. He also specifies that it had meaning to him and that he is simply acknowledging the symbol being spread and is happy for its doing so.

=== Live performances ===
At the Global Citizen Festival in New York Coldplay performed six songs, ending with the live debut of a new song, "Amazing Day", which was also performed at TFI Friday, where they played four songs including the live debut of "Adventure of a Lifetime". During their concert at Belasco Theater, in Los Angeles, they performed four new songs, including the live debut of "A Head Full of Dreams" and "Up&Up". On 24 November, Coldplay published short snippets of each new song via Instagram, at hourly intervals. On 7 February 2016, the band headlined the Super Bowl 50 halftime show.

== Singles ==
"Adventure of a Lifetime", was released on 6 November 2015 as the album's lead single, the music video came out on 29 November 2015. "Everglow" then premiered on Zane Lowe's Beats 1 radio show on 26 November 2015 and released as a promotional single on the following day. "Hymn for the Weekend" was released as the second single for the album on 25 January 2016. The band received criticism from certain media outlets for the portrayal of Indian society in its music video. The third single, "Up&Up", was released on 22 April 2016, while "A Head Full of Dreams" arrived on 19 August 2016 with an accompanying music video. A stripped-down version of "Everglow", which was inspired by Martin's unrehearsed solo performance of the song due to a technical mishap at Glastonbury Festival, was released as the fifth and final single on 11 November 2016.

== Critical reception ==
=== Reviews ===
Professional ratings
Aggregate scores
Source	Rating
AnyDecentMusic?	5.5/10
Metacritic	60/100
Review scores
Source	Rating
AllMusic	3.5/5 stars
Chicago Tribune	2/4 stars
The Daily Telegraph	3/5 stars
The Guardian	3/5 stars
The Independent	3/5 stars
NME	4/5
Pitchfork	4.8/10
Q	4/5 stars
Rolling Stone	4/5 stars
Spin	6/10

A Head Full of Dreams received generally mixed reviews from critics. At Metacritic, which assigns a normalized rating from mainstream critics' reviews, the album has a score of 60 out of 100 based on 27 reviews, indicating "mixed or average reviews". Jon Dolan of Rolling Stone wrote that A Head Full of Dreams "might be Coldplay's brightest album ever" and concluded: "He's [Chris Martin] hinted that this could be Coldplay's last album; if so, they're going out on a sustained note of grace." Barry Nicolson of NME called it "the most satisfying collection of songs they've written in years".

Alexis Petridis of The Guardian felt that A Head Full of Dreams "is frustratingly blighted by the sense that Coldplay haven't fully committed to the album's big idea" and remarked: "It's a moot point whether that's a sign of innate conservatism or of a band that know exactly what they are doing, who understand that you won't keep packing out those Midwestern sports stadiums if you frighten the horses." Citing the band's unwillingness to stray from their tried and true formula, Ian Gormely of Exclaim! wrote that "A Head Full of Dreams might have been a poptimist masterpiece. Instead, it's just another Coldplay album, with all the baggage—both positive and negative—that entails."

Stephen Thomas Erlewine of AllMusic gave the album 3.5/5 stars and acknowledged that "[the] message [that there's a big, bright, beautiful world just waiting to be discovered if you just open your heart and live a little] is unabashedly corny", but ultimately concluded that "under the stewardship of Chris Martin, Coldplay cheerfully embrace the cheese, ratcheting up both the sparkle and the sentiment so the album feels genuine in its embrace of eternal middle-aged clichés."

In a 1/5 star review in Truck & Driver's regular music reviews Shaun Connors queried "why such boring wishy-washy material has been successful," commenting the reasoning for this defeats all rational explanation. He continued: "With this latest collection of tedium there are contributions from Beyoncé (a so-so vocalist) and Noel Gallagher (a not even so-so guitarist)," to conclude with: "On the basis of this album, they've either run out of ideas or bored themselves senseless (or both)..." Under the Radar's Scott Dransfield panned the album as "insufferably bland at best and downright offensive at worst" and awarded it 2/10 stars.

=== Rankings ===
List of critic rankings
Publication	Description	Result	Ref.
Correio Braziliense	15 Best Albums of 2015	Placed	
Daily Record	20 Best Albums of 2015	16	
Entertainment Weekly	The 50 Best Albums of 2015	29	
Europe 2	Top 10 Best Albums of 2015	Placed	
NME	Albums of the Year 2015	35	
Panorama	The 15 Best Albums of 2015	2	
People	Best Albums of 2015	9	
Tidal	Albums of the Year 2015	Placed	
Variance	The 50 Best Albums of 2015	24	
Yahoo!	Paul Grein's Best Albums of 2015	5	

== Accolades ==
List of awards and nominations
Year	Ceremony	Category	Result	Ref.
2016	BBC Music Awards	Album of the Year	Nominated	
2016	Billboard Music Awards	Top Rock Album	Nominated	
2016	Brit Awards	British Album of the Year	Nominated	
2016	Hungarian Music Awards	Foreign Alternative/Indie Rock Album of the Year	Nominated	
2016	Los 40 Music Awards	International Album of the Year	Nominated	
2016	Q Awards	Best Album	Nominated	
2016	Žebřík Music Awards	Best Foreign Album	Nominated	
2017	Juno Awards	International Album of the Year	Won	
2017	Rockol Awards	Best International Album – Critics Vote	Nominated	
2017	Rockol Awards	Best International Album – Public Vote	Nominated	
2017	Swiss Music Awards	Best International Album	Won	
2017	TEC Awards	Record Production / Album	Nominated	

== Commercial performance ==
A Head Full of Dreams sold over 827,000 copies in its first week worldwide. The album was kept from number one by Adele's 25 in most countries, despite reaching the summit in more than 100 territories on iTunes. In the United Kingdom, Coldplay debuted at second place with 235,975 units sold. It was their highest first-week sales since Viva la Vida or Death and All His Friends, which moved 302,074 copies upon release. Had A Head Full of Dreams debuted atop the UK Albums Chart, it would have made Coldplay the second band in the British history to achieve the feat with their first seven albums, after Oasis. The record did, however, topped both the UK Album Downloads Chart and the Official Vinyl Albums Chart. In February 2016, Coldplay performed at the Super Bowl 50 halftime show and the positive reception led A Head Full of Dreams to reach number one with 30,146 units sold. This put them at second place in the list of acts with the most UK number one albums in the 21st century; only Robbie Williams has more, with 10.

The album also reached number two in Australia, Canada, the Netherlands and Italy. In the Netherlands, it reached number one during its 30th week, after Coldplay performed two concerts in Amsterdam. In Japan, A Head Full of Dreams debuted at number seven with 13,004 physical copies sold. The Japanese Tour edition entered the Oricon Albums Chart at number 159 with 431 copies, eventually rising to number 104 with 625 copies. The album shifted more than 4.5 million units worldwide as of November 2017.

In the United States, A Head Full of Dreams debuted at number two on the Billboard 200 on the issue dating 26 December 2015, with 210,000 equivalent album units, behind Adele's 25. It was the second-best-selling album of the week, selling 195,000 copies in its first week, which is a drop from the 383,000 copies sold in the first week by Ghost Stories. In its second week, the album fell to number seven on the Billboard 200, selling 61,000 copies. On the chart dated 27 February 2016, the album returned to the top 10 of the US Billboard 200, peaking at number four, selling 90,000 units (71,000 in pure album sales).

The only countries where A Head Full of Dreams managed to debut at number one were Argentina and Norway, replacing 25. In the latter, this allowed Coldplay to secure what Adele prevented them from doing elsewhere: all of their studio albums reaching the top. As per International Business Times, the album helped streaming services like Apple Music and Spotify enjoy a revenue boost of £83 million. Singles "Adventure of a Lifetime" and "Hymn for the Weekend" charted at number 95 and 73, respectively on the Billboard Hot 100 year-end chart in 2016, making A Head Full of Dreams their first album to earn two entries on said ranking.

== Track listing ==
All tracks are written by Coldplay and Stargate, with production from Stargate and Rik Simpson, except where noted.

A Head Full of Dreams – standard edition track listing
No.	Title	Producer(s)	Length
1.	"A Head Full of Dreams"	Stargate; Simpson; Dan Green^{[c]}	3:43
2.	"Birds"		3:49
3.	"Hymn for the Weekend"	Stargate; Simpson; Digital Divide^{[a]}	4:18
4.	"Everglow"	Stargate; Simpson; Green^{[c]}	4:42
5.	"Adventure of a Lifetime"		4:23
6.	"Fun" (featuring Tove Lo)		4:27
7.	"Kaleidoscope"		1:51
8.	"Army of One"	Stargate; Simpson; Green	6:16
9.	"Amazing Day"		4:31
10.	"Colour Spectrum"	Stargate; Simpson; Green	1:00
11.	"Up&Up"		6:45
Total length:			45:45

A Head Full of Dreams – Japanese edition bonus track
No.	Title	Producer(s)	Length
12.	"Miracles"	Stargate; Simpson; Green	3:55
Total length:			49:40

A Head Full of Dreams – Atlantic 75 Edition bonus track
No.	Title	Producer(s)	Length
12.	"Something Just Like This" (featuring The Chainsmokers)	The Chainsmokers; DJ Swivel	4:07
Total length:			49:52

A Head Full of Dreams – Australia & New Zealand Tour edition bonus tracks
No.	Title	Length
12.	"Adventure of a Lifetime" (Matoma remix)	4:13
13.	"Hymn for the Weekend" (Seeb remix)	3:31
14.	"Up&Up" (Freedo remix)	3:30
15.	"Magic" (live at the Enmore Theatre)	5:00
16.	"Clocks" (live at the Enmore Theatre)	4:21
17.	"Viva la Vida" (live at the Enmore Theatre)	4:12
18.	"Oceans" (live at the Enmore Theatre)	4:00
19.	"A Sky Full of Stars" (live at the Enmore Theatre)	5:48

A Head Full of Dreams – Japanese Tour edition bonus tracks
No.	Title	Length
13.	"Adventure of a Lifetime" (Matoma remix)	4:13
14.	"Hymn for the Weekend" (Seeb remix)	3:31
15.	"Up&Up" (Freedo remix)	3:30
16.	"Magic" (live at Tokyo Dome City Hall)	4:59
17.	"Clocks" (live at Tokyo Dome City Hall)	5:21
18.	"Viva la Vida" (live at Tokyo Dome City Hall)	4:16
19.	"Oceans" (live at Tokyo Dome City Hall)	3:59
20.	"A Sky Full of Stars" (live at Tokyo Dome City Hall)	5:13

Sample credits

- "Kaleidoscope" contains a sample of "Amazing Grace", written by John Newton.
- "Kaleidoscope" and "Colour Spectrum" contain an excerpt of "The Guesthouse" by Rumi, read by Coleman Banks.

Notes

- ^{^[a]} indicates an additional producer.
- ^{^[c]} indicates a co-producer.
- "Army of One" contains the hidden track "X Marks the Spot", which begins at 3:23.
- "Colour Spectrum" is stylised as " ".

== Personnel ==
Credits are adapted from A Head Full of Dreams liner notes.

Coldplay

- Chris Martin – lead vocals, keyboards, acoustic guitar (tracks 2, 6, and 11)
- Jonny Buckland – electric guitar, keyboards, backing vocals (tracks 3 and 11)
- Guy Berryman – bass, keyboards
- Will Champion – drums, drum pad, percussion, backing vocals
- Phil Harvey

Additional musicians

- Davide Rossi – strings (tracks 2 and 9)
- Tim Bergling – additional programming (track 3)
- Regiment Horns – brass (track 3)
- Beyoncé – vocals (tracks 3, 10 and 11)
- Gwyneth Paltrow – vocals (track 4)
- Merry Clayton – vocals (tracks 5 and 11)
- Tove Lo – vocals (track 6)
- Khatia Buniatishvili – piano (track 7)
- Coleman Barks – narration (track 7)
- Barack Obama – spoken word (track 7 and 10)
- Annabelle Wallis – vocals (track 11)
- Noel Gallagher – guitar (track 11)
- Moses Martin – tambourine (track 11)
- Rik Simpson – vocals, additional instruments
- Mikkel Eriksen – additional instruments
- Tor Hermansen – additional instruments

Design

- Pilar Zeta, Coldplay – design, art direction
- Phil Harvey – photography
- Ultramajic – photography

Choir

- Nico Berryman
- Jonah Buckland
- Violet Buckland
- Blue Ivy Carter
- Ava Champion
- Juno Champion
- Marianna Champion
- Rex Champion
- Aubrey Costall
- Harvey Costall
- James Duncan
- Brian Eno
- Elise Eriksen
- Hege Fossum Eriksen
- Selma Eriksen
- Jacob Green
- Sophia Green
- Daniel Grollo
- Finn Grollo
- Kat Grollo
- Mathilda Grollo
- Max Harvey
- Rofi Harvey
- Idil Hermansen
- Isak Hermansen
- Apple Martin
- Moses Martin

Production

- Stargate – production
- Rik Simpson – production, mixing (track 1–4, 6, 7, 9–11)
- Phil Tan – mixing (track 5 and 8)
- Dan Green – production, mixing (track 8 and 10), additional engineering
- Digital Divide – additional production (track 3)
- Emily Lazar – mastering
- Merlin Watts – mastering
- Bill Rahko – engineering
- Miles Walker – engineering
- Daniela Rivera – engineering
- Tom Bailey – additional engineering
- Robin Baynton – additional engineering
- Jaime Sickora – additional engineering
- Aleks von Korff – additional engineering
- Laurence Anslow – additional studio assistance
- Fiona Cruickshank – additional studio assistance
- Nicolas Essig – additional studio assistance
- Olga Fitzroy – additional studio assistance
- Jeff Gartenbaum – additional studio assistance
- Christian Green – additional studio assistance
- Pablo Hernandez – additional studio assistance
- Phil Joly – additional studio assistance
- Miguel Lara – additional studio assistance
- Matt McGinn – additional studio assistance
- Chris Owens – additional studio assistance
- Roxy Pope – additional studio assistance
- John Prestage – additional studio assistance
- Kyle Stevens – additional studio assistance
- Derrick Stockwell – additional studio assistance
- Matt Tuggle – additional studio assistance
- Ryan Walsh – additional studio assistance
- Joachim Berose – additional studio assistance
- Will Wetzel – additional studio assistance

== Charts ==
=== Weekly charts ===
Weekly chart performance
Chart (2015–2023)	Peak position
Argentine Albums (CAPIF)	1
Australian Albums (ARIA)	2
Austrian Albums (Ö3 Austria)	4
Belgian Albums (Ultratop Flanders)	2
Belgian Albums (Ultratop Wallonia)	2
Brazilian Albums (ABPD)	4
Canadian Albums (Billboard)	2
Croatian International Albums (HDU)	2
Czech Albums (ČNS IFPI)	3
Danish Albums (Hitlisten)	4
Dutch Albums (Album Top 100)	1
Finnish Albums (Suomen virallinen lista)	3
French Albums (SNEP)	4
German Albums (Offizielle Top 100)	3
Greek Albums (IFPI)	11
Hong Kong Albums (HKRMA)	3
Hungarian Albums (MAHASZ)	3
Irish Albums (Official Charts)	2
Italian Albums (FIMI)	2
Japanese Albums (Oricon)	7
Japanese Hot Albums (Billboard Japan)	2
Latvian Albums (LaIPA)	70
Mexican Albums (Top 100 Mexico)	4
New Zealand Albums (RMNZ)	4
Norwegian Albums (VG-lista)	1
Polish Albums (ZPAV)	2
Portuguese Albums (AFP)	3
Scottish Albums (Official Charts)	1
Slovak Albums (ČNS IFPI)	5
South African Albums (RISA)	12
South Korean Albums (Circle)	13
South Korean International Albums (Circle)	2
Spanish Albums (Promusicae)	2
Swedish Albums (Sverigetopplistan)	3
Swiss Albums (Schweizer Hitparade)	1
Taiwanese Albums (Five Music)	2
UK Albums (Official Charts)	1
US Billboard 200	2
US Top Rock & Alternative Albums (Billboard)	1

Weekly chart performance (Japanese Tour edition)
Chart (2017)	Peak position
Japanese Albums (Oricon)	104

=== Monthly charts ===
Monthly chart performance
Chart (2015–2016)	Peak position
Argentine Albums (CAPIF)	5
Japanese Albums (Oricon)	12
South Korean Albums (Gaon)	37
South Korean International Albums (Gaon)	3
Uruguayan Albums (CUD)	6

=== Year-end charts ===
Year-end chart performance
Chart (2015)	Position
Australian Albums (ARIA)	22
Austrian Albums (Ö3 Austria)	50
Belgian Albums (Ultratop Flanders)	25
Belgian Albums (Ultratop Wallonia)	27
Danish Albums (Hitlisten)	45
Dutch Albums (Album Top 100)	9
French Albums (SNEP)	18
German Albums (Offizielle Top 100)	14
Hungarian Albums (MAHASZ)	12
Irish Albums (IRMA)	16
Italian Albums (FIMI)	13
Mexican Albums (Top 100 Mexico)	37
New Zealand Albums (RMNZ)	19
Polish Albums (ZPAV)	29
South Korean International Albums (Gaon)	24
Spanish Albums (Promusicae)	23
Swedish Albums (Sverigetopplistan)	61
Swiss Albums (Schweizer Hitparade)	12
UK Albums (OCC)	9
Worldwide Albums (IFPI)	8

Chart (2016)	Position
Australian Albums (ARIA)	11
Austrian Albums (Ö3 Austria)	40
Belgian Albums (Ultratop Flanders)	16
Belgian Albums (Ultratop Wallonia)	12
Canadian Albums (Billboard)	7
Croatian International Albums (HDU)	7
Danish Albums (Hitlisten)	8
Dutch Albums (Album Top 100)	6
French Albums (SNEP)	21
German Albums (Offizielle Top 100)	32
Hungarian Albums (MAHASZ)	24
Icelandic Albums (Plötutíóindi)	83
Italian Albums (FIMI)	8
Japanese Hot Albums (Billboard Japan)	96
Mexican Albums (Top 100 Mexico)	20
New Zealand Albums (RMNZ)	16
Norwegian Albums (VG-lista)	7
Polish Albums (ZPAV)	59
Slovak Albums (ČNS IFPI)	3
South Korean International Albums (Gaon)	20
Spanish Albums (Promusicae)	9
Swedish Albums (Sverigetopplistan)	10
Swiss Albums (Schweizer Hitparade)	3
UK Albums (OCC)	2
US Alternative Albums (Billboard)	2
US Digital Albums (Billboard)	11
US Billboard 200	13
US Top Rock Albums (Billboard)	2
Worldwide Albums (IFPI)	9

Chart (2017)	Position
Belgian Albums (Ultratop Flanders)	20
Belgian Albums (Ultratop Wallonia)	28
Croatian International Albums (HDU)	29
Danish Albums (Hitlisten)	77
Dutch Albums (Album Top 100)	41
Hungarian Albums (MAHASZ)	89
Italian Albums (FIMI)	28
New Zealand Albums (RMNZ)	45
Norwegian Albums (VG-lista)	39
Polish Albums (ZPAV)	10
Portuguese Albums (AFP)	20
South Korean International Albums (Gaon)	13
Spanish Albums (Promusicae)	44
Swedish Albums (Sverigetopplistan)	53
UK Albums (OCC)	48
US Top Rock Albums (Billboard)	70

Chart (2018)	Position
Portuguese Albums (AFP)	72
South Korean International Albums (Gaon)	77

=== Decade-end charts ===
Decade-end chart performance
Chart (2010–2019)	Position
Australian Albums (ARIA)	98
Dutch Albums (Album Top 100)	29
Norwegian Albums (VG-lista)	29
UK Albums (OCC)	28
UK Vinyl Albums (OCC)	65
US Top Rock Albums (Billboard)	45

== Certifications and sales ==
Certifications and sales
Region	Certification	Certified units/sales
Argentina (CAPIF)	Gold	20,000^{^}
Australia (ARIA)	2× Platinum	140,000^{‡}
Austria (IFPI Austria)	2× Platinum	30,000^{*}
Belgium (BRMA)	Platinum	30,000^{*}
Brazil (Pro-Música Brasil)	Diamond	160,000^{*}
Canada (Music Canada)	2× Platinum	160,000^{‡}
Chile (IFPI Chile)	Gold	5,000 (Note: Chilean certified sales for A Head Full of Dreams as of December 2015.)
Denmark (IFPI Danmark)	3× Platinum	60,000^{‡}
France (SNEP)	Diamond	500,000^{‡}
Germany (BVMI)	2× Platinum	400,000^{‡}
Hungary (MAHASZ)	2× Platinum	4,000^{^}
Ireland (IRMA)	3× Platinum	45,000^{^}
Italy (FIMI)	5× Platinum	250,000^{‡}
Japan	—	54,998 (Note: Japanese physical sales for A Head Full of Dreams as of May 2017.)
Mexico (AMPROFON)	Platinum+Gold	90,000^{^}
Netherlands (NVPI)	Platinum	40,000^{‡}
New Zealand (RMNZ)	4× Platinum	60,000^{‡}
Poland (ZPAV)	3× Platinum	60,000^{‡}
Portugal (AFP)	2× Platinum	30,000^{^}
Singapore (RIAS)	2× Platinum	20,000^{*}
South Korea	—	9,712 (Note: South Korean year-end physical sales for A Head Full of Dreams from 2015 to 2018.)
Spain (Promusicae)	Platinum	40,000^{‡}
Sweden (GLF)	Gold	20,000^{‡}
Switzerland (IFPI Switzerland)	Platinum	20,000^{^}
United Kingdom (BPI)	4× Platinum	1,375,805 (Note: British total sales for A Head Full of Dreams as of January 2020.)
United States (RIAA)	Platinum	1,000,000^{‡}
^{*} Sales figures based on certification alone.^{^} Shipments figures based on certification alone.^{‡} Sales+streaming figures based on certification alone.

== Release history ==
Release history and formats
Region	Date	Format	Version	Label	Ref.
Various	4 December 2015	CD · LP · digital download · streaming	Standard	Parlophone · Atlantic · Warner Music	(Note: The album's release on streaming was initially exclusive to premium subscribers, arriving on the free tier only on 11 December 2015.)
Various	23 September 2016	Blu-ray	Standard	Parlophone · Atlantic · Warner Music	
Australia	18 November 2016	CD	Tour	Parlophone · Atlantic · Warner Music	
Japan	7 April 2017	CD	Tour	Parlophone · Atlantic · Warner Music	

== See also ==
- 2015 in British music
- List of best-selling albums in France
- List of best-selling albums of the 2010s in the United Kingdom
- List of number-one albums in Argentina
- List of number-one albums in Norway
- List of number-one hits of 2016 (Switzerland)
- List of UK Albums Chart number ones of the 2010s
