= A Head Full of Dreams (song) =

2016 single by Coldplay

- Promotional graphic for the song

Single by Coldplay

from the album A Head Full of Dreams
- Released: 19 August 2016
- Genre: Alternative rock; indie pop
- Length: 3:43 (album version); 3:29 (radio edit); 5:00 (music video)
- Label: Parlophone; Atlantic
- Songwriters: Guy Berryman; Jonny Buckland; Will Champion; Chris Martin
- Producers: Rik Simpson; Stargate

Coldplay singles chronology
"Up&Up" (2016)	"A Head Full of Dreams" (2016)	"Everglow" (2016)

Music video
- "A Head Full of Dreams" on YouTube

"A Head Full of Dreams" is a song by British rock band Coldplay from the band's seventh studio album of the same name (2015). It was produced by Rik Simpson and Stargate, being released as the fourth single from the record on 19 August 2016 with an accompanying music video.

== Background and release ==
The song was recorded by the band during sessions for their seventh studio album in 2014, at their purpose-built studios the Bakery and the Beehive in North London, England, both originally constructed for work on their three previous studio albums. The song "fades in with distantly chiming bells, a synthetic dance pulse, a drum set shuffling complicatedly, and a guitar repeatedly drawing a high, short melody". The title song of the same name would then be serviced to contemporary hit radio in the United Kingdom as the fourth official single from the album on 31 August 2016 and in the Italy on 7 October 2016.

== Critical reception ==
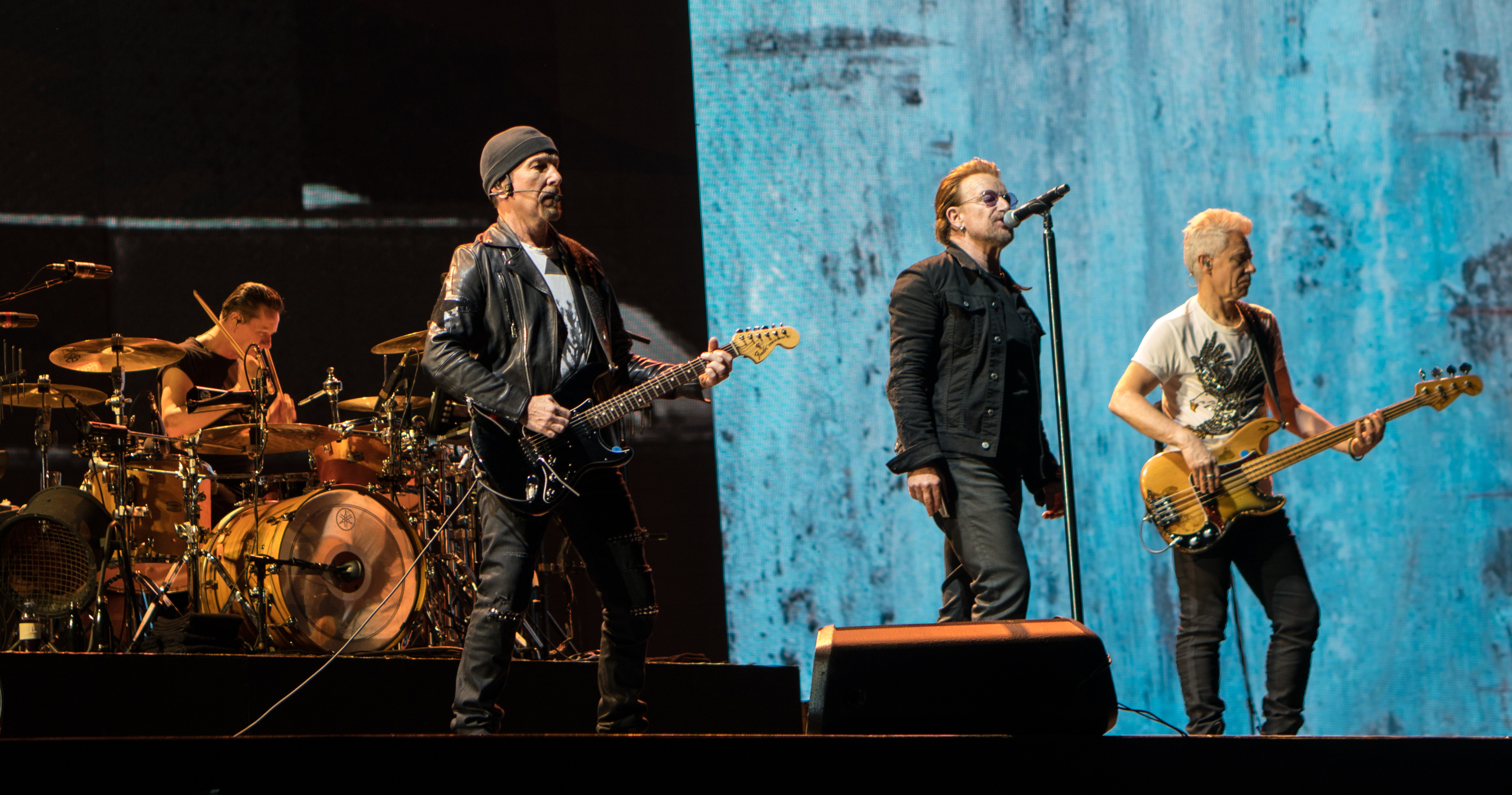
The song drew comparisons to the work of U2 (pictured in 2017).

The song received generally positive reviews from critics, many of whom compared its sound to that of U2. The Atlantic's Spencer Kornhaber called the song's arrangement "cool" and "unusual". Furthermore, he said that the bells, dance pulse, drums, and guitar parts "[drop] out for a bit before the two-minute mark, and you retroactively realized you just experienced the chorus, when Martin sang the title of the song twice to the tune of that guitar line you'd heard earlier. The second verse doesn't end in a chorus, but rather launches into an Arcade Fire-style 'ohh-ohhhh” refrain.'" Janine Schaults of Consequence of Sound said the song "opens with chimes signaling entry into a magical land — like opening the door to Willy Wonka's gluttonous factory. But, the song wastes no time getting to its generic 'oh oh oh-a-oh' chorus, the kind of thing that a glowing sea of wailers will shout up to the rafters of the stadiums the band visits on tour next year. A bit lazy, one could argue, but as Martin told The Wall Street Journal, he doesn’t want 'anything to get in the way of the mood of the music ... you can't translate the melody into words'".

Adam Silverstein of Digital Spy wrote, "Before Martin's split from Gwyneth and the emotional Ghost Stories that followed, Coldplay were on their way to a poppier place with 2011's Mylo Xyloto. 'A Head Full of Dreams' gladly re-conjures those bright and shiny colours again, while also spinning a guitar line that could have fallen off U2's Joshua Tree. It's the first sign that Martin is ready to move on, joyfully hatching a world where dreams come to life. Welcome back, Chris - we missed you". The Guardian's Alexis Petridis said, "The title track adds some pep to the tried-and-tested Coldplay formula – echoing guitars, bombastic piano, massed, stadium-rousing woah-oh vocals – by tying it to a disco pulse". Pitchfork's Stuart Berman wrote, "The title track eases us into the album on a glistening groove but halts its momentum for a now-obligatory 'woah oh oh oh' breakdown that sounds like it was focus-grouped into the song." Jon Dolan of Rolling Stone mentioned that the song "sounds like U2 and New Order on a joint humanitarian mission". Spin's Andrew Unterberger also drew comparisons to the former band. Tom Breihan of Stereogum claimed that "A Head Full of Dreams" and "Adventure of a Lifetime" decorate the kickdrums with "spangled pseudo-Afropop guitars" and charts. Panorama ranked "A Head Full of Dreams" among the best songs of 2015.

== Music video ==
A music video for the song was released on 19 August 2016. It was directed by James Marcus Haney and was filmed in Mexico City in April 2016 when the band performed there for their tour. The video shows the band biking around the streets of Mexico City and them performing the song at the Foro Sol. The beginning of the video also features a voice-over of Charlie Chaplin's speech from the 1940 film The Great Dictator.

== Live performances ==
The song was performed on The Late Late Show with James Corden, along with "Adventure of a Lifetime", on 12 November 2015. It was also performed at the X Factor Italy in Milan. The song was the opening song for their A Head Full of Dreams Tour.

== Track listing ==
Digital download
No.	Title	Length
1.	"A Head Full of Dreams"	3:43

Digital download (Radio Edit)
No.	Title	Length
1.	"A Head Full of Dreams" (Radio Edit)	3:29

== Credits and personnel ==
Credits are adapted from A Head Full of Dreams liner notes.

Coldplay

- Guy Berryman – bass guitar
- Jonny Buckland – electric guitar
- Will Champion – drums, drum pad, percussion, backing vocals
- Chris Martin – lead vocals, piano, keyboard

Additional musicians

- Mikkel S Eriksen – additional instruments, production, mixing
- Tor Erik Hermansen – additional instruments, production, mixing
- Rik Simpson – additional instruments, backing vocals, mixing

== Charts ==
=== Weekly charts ===
Weekly chart performance
Chart (2015–2017)	Peak position
Belgium (Ultratip Bubbling Under Flanders)	2
Belgium (Ultratop 50 Wallonia)	14
France (SNEP)	156
Iceland (RÚV)	2
Italy (FIMI)	58
Italy Airplay (EarOne)	1
Netherlands (Single Top 100)	60
Slovakia Airplay (ČNS IFPI)	32
Slovenia (SloTop50)	45
South Korea International (Gaon)	44
Spain (Promusicae)	45
Sweden Heatseeker (Sverigetopplistan)	12
Switzerland Airplay (Schweizer Hitparade)	78
UK Singles (Official Charts)	173
US Hot Rock & Alternative Songs (Billboard)	26

=== Monthly charts ===
Monthly chart performance
Chart (2017)	Peak position
South Korea International (Gaon)	97

=== Year-end charts ===
Year-end chart performance
Chart (2016)	Position
Italy Airplay (EarOne)	45

== Certifications ==
Certifications
Region	Certification	Certified units/sales
Italy (FIMI)	Platinum	50,000^{‡}
Spain (Promusicae)	Gold	30,000^{‡}
New Zealand (RMNZ)	Gold	15,000^{‡}
United Kingdom (BPI)	Gold	400,000^{‡}
^{‡} Sales+streaming figures based on certification alone.

== Release history ==
Release dates and formats
Region	Date	Format	Version	Label	Ref.
Worldwide	19 August 2016	Digital download	Original	Parlophone	
United Kingdom	31 August 2016	Contemporary hit radio	Radio edit	Parlophone	
Italy	7 October 2016	Contemporary hit radio	Radio edit	Warner	
