= Up&Up =

2016 single by Coldplay

Single by Coldplay

from the album A Head Full of Dreams
- Released: 22 April 2016
- Recorded: 2014–2015
- Length: 6:45 (album version); 3:58 (single version); 4:10 (music video)
- Label: Parlophone; Atlantic
- Songwriters: Guy Berryman; Jonny Buckland; Will Champion; Chris Martin
- Producers: Rik Simpson; Stargate

Coldplay singles chronology
"Hymn for the Weekend" (2016)	"Up&Up" (2016)	"A Head Full of Dreams" (2016)

Music video
- "Up&Up" on YouTube

"Up&Up" is a song by British rock band Coldplay from their seventh studio album, A Head Full of Dreams (2015). It was released as the third single of the record on 22 April 2016 by Parlophone. Background vocals in the song are provided by Beyoncé, Annabelle Wallis and Merry Clayton. A music video for the track, directed by Vania Heymann and Gal Muggia, was released on 16 May 2016. It features a guitar solo by Noel Gallagher, and was performed by the band at the Super Bowl 50 halftime show and the Glastonbury Festival in 2016.

== Background ==
The song contains a chorus choir, which featured nearly all the artists who have collaborated with the group, including Brian Eno, the children and guests of the four musicians, plus Beyoncé. Guitarist and singer Noel Gallagher also contributed a guitar solo, which was omitted in the radio edit.

== Music video ==
The music video makes extensive use of impossible imagery, including dolphins swimming in a sea situated underneath an inverted landmass

The band had released teasers on their social media accounts leading up to the video release. The music video, directed by Gal Muggia and Vania Heymann, who studied at Israel’s Bezalel Academy of Art and Design in Jerusalem, was released on 16 May 2016. The video has been described on the band's website as a "poignant, surrealist montage which alludes to contemporary issues." The video itself consists of over-layered visuals, and has the band playing the song in various landscapes and locations. One of the locations used is the Croatian mountain range of Biokovo, upon which Chris Martin appears to be seated. Heyman and Mugglia have been credited for their creative use of stock footage throughout the video.

Scenes and visual effects for the video were created by GloriaFX, a Ukraine-based visual effects company, headed by Anatolii Kuzmytskyi in Ukraine and by Max Colt in the US. Martin called it "one of the best videos ever made". Scenes include "a volcano that pops out popcorn, a baby that flies on the wing of a plane, and skydivers who jump into a bowl of pasta".

The band's lead singer, Chris Martin feels that its visual was one of best videos to be made. He says ''The video is — I'm going to drop the mic here and say — I think it's one of the best videos people have made. Even if you take the music away. That's my point".

Billboard's Chris Payne described the music video as "appropriately epic" with "a heady, shoot-for-the-stars type of statement". Carl Williott of Idolator, who was reserved towards the song itself, felt that its video "elevates it thanks to some artfully trippy visuals". MTV UK called it "weird and wonderful in every respect" and "magical yet poignant".

== Accolades ==
List of awards and nominations
Year	Ceremony	Category	Result	Ref.
2016	Camerimage Film Festival	Best Music Video	Nominated	
2016	Camerimage Film Festival	Best Cinematography in a Music Video	Nominated	
2016	Ciclope Festival	Music Video – Direction	Nominated	
2016	Ciclope Festival	Music Video – Visual Effects	Gold	
2016	London International Awards (Note: The London International Awards was established in 1986 to honour excellence in advertising based on a peer-voted selection process.)	Music Video – Grand LIA	Won	
2016	London International Awards	Music Video – Best Music Video	Gold	
2016	London International Awards	Music Video – Best Direction	Gold	
2016	Los 40 Music Awards	International Video of the Year	Won	
2016	MTV Europe Music Awards	Best Video	Nominated	
2016	MTV Video Music Awards	Best Direction	Nominated	
2016	MTV Video Music Awards	Best Visual Effects	Won	
2016	MTV Video Music Awards Japan	Best Group Video – International	Nominated	
2016	MTV Video Music Awards Japan	Best Rock Video	Nominated	
2016	NRJ Music Awards	Video of the Year	Nominated	
2016	Q Awards	Best Video	Nominated	
2016	Telehit Awards	Video of the Year	Won	
2016	UK Music Video Awards	Best Rock/Indie Video	Won	
2016	UK Music Video Awards	Best Visual Effects in a Video	Nominated	
2017	AICP Show	Music Video	Won	
2017	Andy Awards	Video/Cinema – Direction	Bronze	
2017	Andy Awards	Video/Cinema – Special Effects	Silver	
2017	Berlin Music Video Awards	Best Visual Effects (Vania Heymann)	Won	
2017	Cannes Lions Festival of Creativity	Excellence in Music Video	Silver	
2017	Cannes Lions Festival of Creativity	Visual Effects	Silver	
2017	D&AD Awards	Music Video – General Field: Wood Pencil	Won	
2017	D&AD Awards	Music Video – Special Effects: Graphite Pencil	Won	
2017	Grammy Awards	Best Music Video	Nominated	
2017	MTV Italian Music Awards	Best Music Video	Nominated	
2017	The One Show	Branded Entertainment: Music Videos	Silver	
2017	The One Show	Moving Image Craft: Visual Effects	Gold	
2017	Webby Awards	Video & Film – Music Video	Won	
2017	Žebřík Music Awards	Best Foreign Video	2nd place	

== Live performances ==
After giving fans a live performance preview of the album on 21 November 2015 in Los Angeles, Martin said: "This is kind of the song we've been waiting to write for 15 years." The band performed the song at the Super Bowl 50 halftime show held on 7 February 2016 in Santa Clara, California. They were joined by Bruno Mars and Beyoncé while singing the last verses. During the performance at Glastonbury Festival on 26 June 2016, the band were joined on stage by Chris Martin's children, Apple and Moses, who helped with the backing vocals.

The song was used to close the A Head Full of Dreams Tour. The live performance on 15 November 2017 in La Plata, Buenos Aires with an extended outro is included in Live in Buenos Aires. Live recordings of the song have been released with the Butterfly Package as well as the Japanese exclusive live album ‘Love in Tokyo’ released in 2018.

== Track listing ==
Digital download
No.	Title	Length
1.	"Up&Up"	6:45

Digital download (Radio Edit)
No.	Title	Length
1.	"Up&Up" (Radio Edit)	3:58

Digital download (Freedo Remix)
No.	Title	Length
1.	"Up&Up" (Freedo Remix)	3:30

== Credits and personnel ==
Credits are adapted from A Head Full of Dreams liner notes.

Coldplay

- Guy Berryman – bass guitar, keyboards
- Jonny Buckland – guitar, keyboards, backing vocals
- Will Champion – drums, backing vocals, programming
- Chris Martin – lead vocals, piano, acoustic guitar

Additional musicians

- Merry Clayton – vocals
- Beyoncé Knowles – vocals
- Annabelle Wallis – vocals
- Blue Ivy Carter – vocals
- Moses Martin – vocals, tambourine
- Noel Gallagher – second guitar solo

== Charts ==
=== Weekly charts ===
Weekly chart performance
Chart (2016–2017)	Peak position
Argentina (Monitor Latino)	3
Australia (ARIA)	74
Austria (Ö3 Austria Top 40)	65
Belgium (Ultratop 50 Flanders)	33
Belgium (Ultratip Bubbling Under Wallonia)	9
CIS Airplay (TopHit)	163
Czech Republic Airplay (ČNS IFPI)	7
France (SNEP)	161
Germany (GfK)	79
Iceland (RÚV)	2
Ireland (IRMA)	95
Israel (Media Forest TV Airplay)	1
Italy (FIMI)	32
Italy Airplay (EarOne)	4
Netherlands (Single Top 100)	65
Poland Airplay (ZPAV)	44
Portugal (AFP)	96
Slovenia (SloTop50)	27
South Korea International (Gaon)	42
Switzerland (Schweizer Hitparade)	32
UK Singles (Official Charts)	71
US Hot Rock & Alternative Songs (Billboard)	30
US Adult Alternative Airplay (Billboard)	8
US Alternative Airplay (Billboard)	22
US Rock & Alternative Airplay (Billboard)	20

=== Monthly charts ===
Monthly chart performance
Chart (2017)	Peak position
South Korea International (Gaon)	87

=== Year-end charts ===
Year-end chart performance
Chart (2016)	Position
Argentina (Monitor Latino)	38
Iceland (Plötutíóindi)	19
Italy (FIMI)	70
Italy Airplay (EarOne)	9
US Hot Rock Songs (Billboard)	75
US Adult Alternative Songs (Billboard)	25

== Certifications ==
Certifications
Region	Certification	Certified units/sales
Australia (ARIA)	Platinum	70,000^{‡}
Italy (FIMI)	2× Platinum	100,000^{‡}
New Zealand (RMNZ)	Gold	15,000^{‡}
Poland (ZPAV)	Gold	25,000^{‡}
Spain (Promusicae)	Gold	30,000^{‡}
United Kingdom (BPI)	Gold	400,000^{‡}
^{‡} Sales+streaming figures based on certification alone.

== Release history ==
Release dates and formats for "Up&Up"
Region	Date	Format	Version	Label	Ref.
Various	4 December 2015	Digital download	Radio edit	Parlophone	
United Kingdom	22 April 2016	Contemporary hit radio	Original	Parlophone	
Italy	20 May 2016	Contemporary hit radio	Original	Warner	
Various	16 September 2016	Digital download	Freedo remix	Parlophone	
