= Super Bowl 50 halftime show =

2016 show headlined by Coldplay

- Part of: Super Bowl 50
- Date: February 7, 2016
- Location: Santa Clara, California
- Venue: Levi's Stadium
- Headliner: Coldplay
- Special guests: Beyoncé; Gustavo Dudamel; Bruno Mars; Mark Ronson; University of California Marching Band; Youth Orchestra Los Angeles
- Sponsor: Pepsi
- Director: Hamish Hamilton
- Producer: Ricky Kirshner

Super Bowl halftime show chronology
XLIX (2015)	50 (2016)	LI (2017)

The Super Bowl 50 halftime show took place on February 7, 2016, at Levi's Stadium in Santa Clara, as part of Super Bowl 50. It was headlined by the British rock band Coldplay, who called Beyoncé, Gustavo Dudamel, Bruno Mars, Mark Ronson, the University of California Marching Band and the Youth Orchestra Los Angeles as guests. With over 115.5 million viewers, it was the most watched halftime set by a group. The band also charted all of their albums on the Billboard 200 afterwards.

Beyoncé's appearance was controversial for performing "Formation", a song regarded by some as an alignment with the Black Lives Matter movement, while others claim it has anti-police and anti-American messages that should be boycotted. Conservatives accused Coldplay of promoting a "gay agenda" as well. Despite its mixed reception from music critics on contemporary reviews, the show has been since ranked as one of the best in Super Bowl history by The Athletic, Parade, Rolling Stone and The Telegraph.

== Background ==
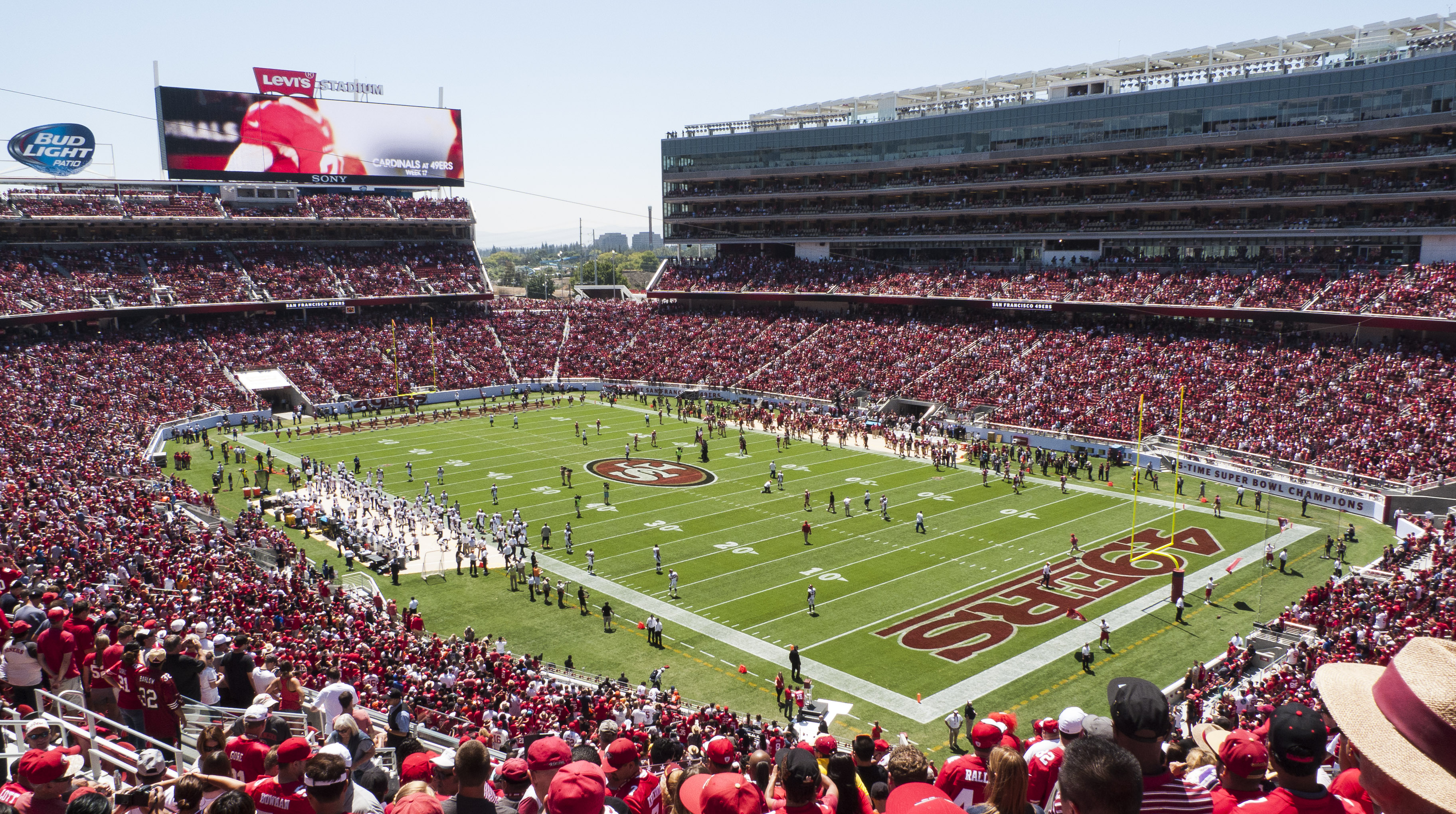
Levi's Stadium, location of Super Bowl 50 and the halftime show

Coldplay, Rihanna, and Katy Perry were considered as potential acts for the Super Bowl XLIX halftime show in 2015. Perry was soon confirmed as the headliner of the halftime show in November 2014. In summer 2015, many acts were being rumored as potential headliners for the 2016 halftime show including Taylor Swift, Britney Spears and One Direction. In September 2015, it was reported that Bruno Mars was set to curate the Super Bowl 50 halftime show, but the next month in October, It was reported that Maroon 5 was in talks to headline, but the band said they haven't had any conversations with the NFL about headlining, but were open to it. Maroon 5 would eventually headline Super Bowl LIII's halftime show. In late November 2015, reports surfaced stating that multiple acts would perform during the halftime show. Coldplay was confirmed as the lead halftime performer for Super Bowl 50 on December 3, 2015, one day before the release of their seventh studio album A Head Full of Dreams. It was later confirmed that Beyoncé and Bruno Mars would join Coldplay as special guests. When Chris Martin originally called Mars to ask him to perform with Coldplay, Mars was wary of a multi-artist performance. The singer of Coldplay then invited Mars to his studio in Malibu where he was working. There, Martin revealed to Mars that he wanted for him to perform "Uptown Funk" with Beyoncé. Despite this, Mars remained skeptical and asked Martin to talk to Beyoncé to determine how she felt about the idea. Martin immediately texted a video of himself with Mars to Beyoncé, in which he asked her in the form of a song if she would come do the Super Bowl with both of them, to which she happily agreed.

One day before the performance, Mars and Beyoncé were "watching playback backstage" while Beyoncé ate a bag of Cheetos. Mars asked her, "That's what you're doing?" to which she replied, "There's nothing more we can do these last two days. It's gonna be what it's gonna be. So I'm gonna enjoy this bag of Cheetos". Mars admitted to learning a lot watching Beyoncé's preparation for the Super Bowl performance, saying that she is "coming for you every single time, so you better bring your A-game every time".

== Performance ==
External videos
- Full Super Bowl 50 Halftime Show – via the NFL's official channel on YouTube.

The show opened with a vibrant audience card stunt on the other side of Levi's Stadium, where spectators held orange, yellow, and blue cards to form a sunburst pattern. On the field, participants held red, white, and blue cards to form the logo of Pepsi – the Super Bowl halftime show sponsor at the time. After that, a separate group of fans ran on the field in excitement. While that happens, Chris Martin sings the opening chorus from "Yellow". He was then joined by the remaining band members of Coldplay to perform "Viva la Vida", "Paradise", and "Adventure of a Lifetime" with the Youth Orchestra Los Angeles conducted by Gustavo Dudamel and the University of California Marching Band. Bruno Mars, Mark Ronson, and a troupe of backing dancers (dressed in the styles of Michael Jackson, who performed in the Super Bowl XXVII halftime show) then performed "Uptown Funk". Beyoncé, also in a Michael Jackson-like bodysuit and appearing with a set of backing dancers dressed as Black Panthers, then performed her new single "Formation" in a mass choreographed dance and forming the letter X (to represent Malcolm X) before joining Mars onstage for a verse of "Uptown Funk".

Coldplay played a snippet of "Clocks" transitioning into "Fix You," and Martin sang along to some of the songs included in a video montage of past Super Bowl halftime and national anthem performances, containing show numbers by Bruce Springsteen, Missy Elliott, Katy Perry, The Rolling Stones, Paul McCartney, Stevie Wonder, Diana Ross, James Brown, Whitney Houston, Michael Jackson, The Black Eyed Peas, U2, Prince, Beyoncé in 2013, and Mars in 2014. The show concluded with the band performing "Up&Up" with Beyoncé, Mars, and everyone taking part in the show. At the end of the performance, spectators on the other side of the stadium participated in another card stunt, this time forming a rainbow pattern with the phrase "Believe in Love".

== Reception ==
=== Critical response ===
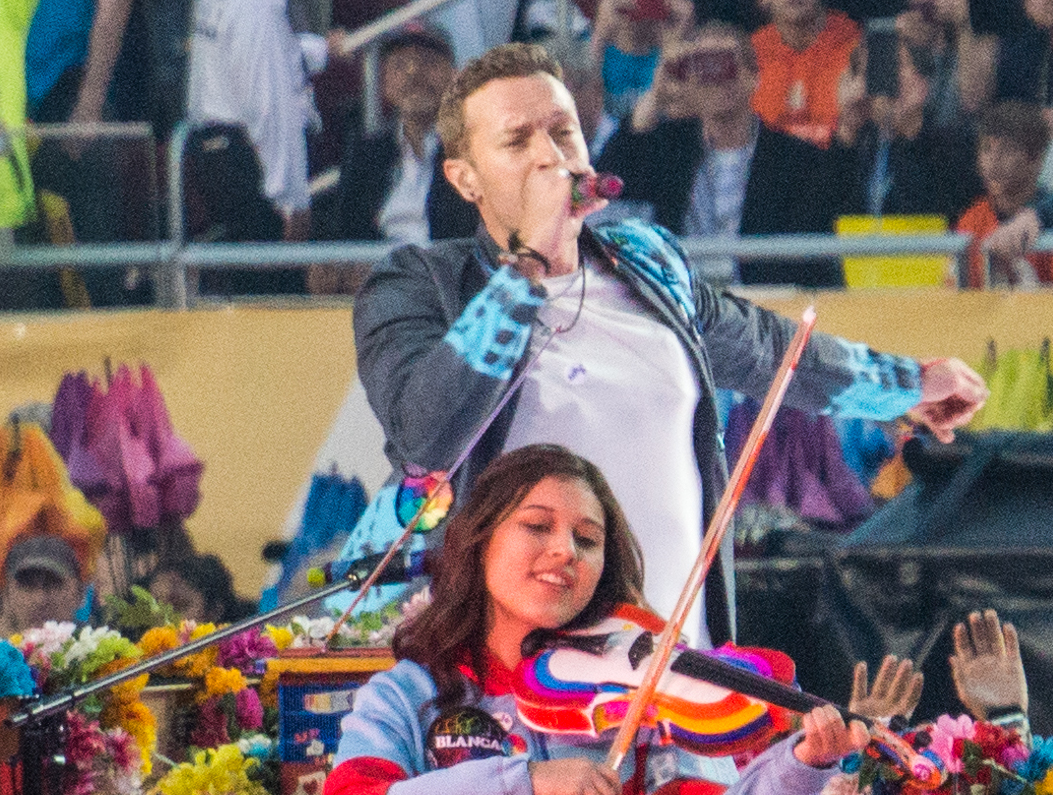
Coldplay frontman Chris Martin performing "Paradise"

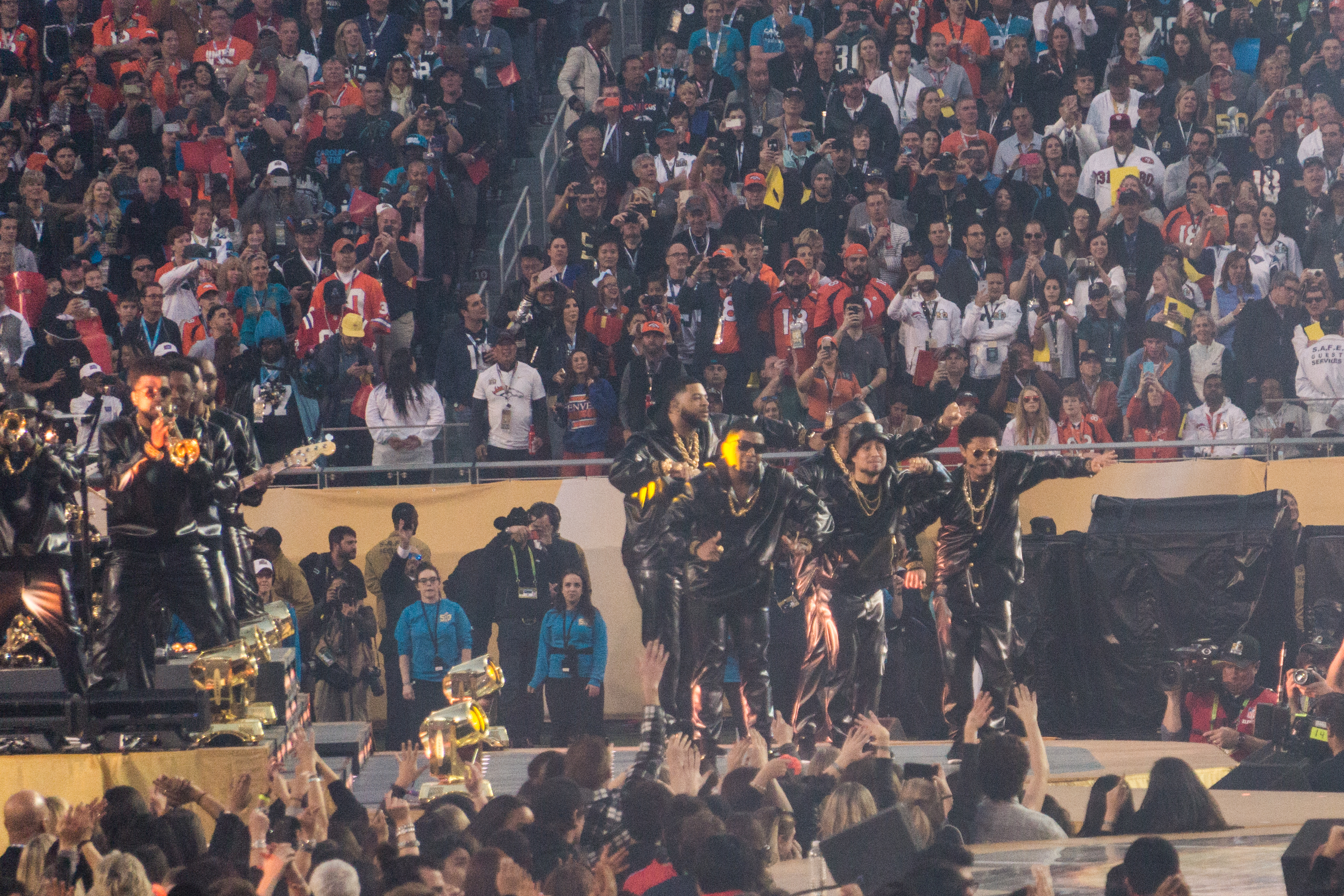
Bruno Mars performing "Uptown Funk"

The performance received generally mixed reviews from critics, who complimented Beyoncé and Mars' part of the performance but were critical of Coldplay. Jon Caramanica of The New York Times stated that Coldplay "acted more as a stagehand than an actual performer" while Beyoncé's section of the performance was "the night's true event". Caramanica also noted that Beyoncé and Mars "outsang" Martin during the closing part of the performance. Andrew Barker of Variety similarly noted that "Coldplay seemed resigned to politely allowing themselves to be played right off their own stage" by the "far flashier" Mars and Beyoncé.

In a review for Fox Sports, Chris Chase panned Coldplay's performance, calling it "inexplicable, indecipherable, and unnecessary" and a "musical snooze". Chase complimented Beyoncé's and Mars' appearances but described the performance as "boring". Alex Needham of The Guardian gave the performance four stars, saying that "Queen Bey at the height of her powers effortlessly overwhelmed Coldplay's widescreen anthems in a show that seemed lightweight until she showed up".

Robert Bianco of USA Today stated that Martin "seemed overwhelmed" by the size of the event, and that despite being a "personable and energetic performer", an "awful lot" of Martin's energy "went into jumping". Bianco praised Beyoncé's appearance and stated that she "stole the show". Wendy Geller of Yahoo! also complimented Beyoncé's and Mars' appearances, but criticized the montage of previous halftime performances, describing it as "confusing rather than touching" and stating that the performance was "definitely a cold play".

=== Industry peers ===
Several public figures in the entertainment industry commented positively on the show through social media, including Andy Cohen, Maksim Chmerkovskiy, Ellen DeGeneres, Victoria Justice, Hoda Kotb, Sarah Michelle Gellar, Donnie Wahlberg and Reese Witherspoon. Elizabeth Banks, Khloe Kardashian and Demi Lovato particularly praised Beyoncé and Mars, while Future published "#Coldplay legendary forever" on his Twitter account. Taylor Swift praised the "Fix You" montage with the previous halftime performances and mentioned feeling like she had dreamed the performance. Conversely, Piers Morgan panned both the show and its subsequent game.

=== Controversy ===
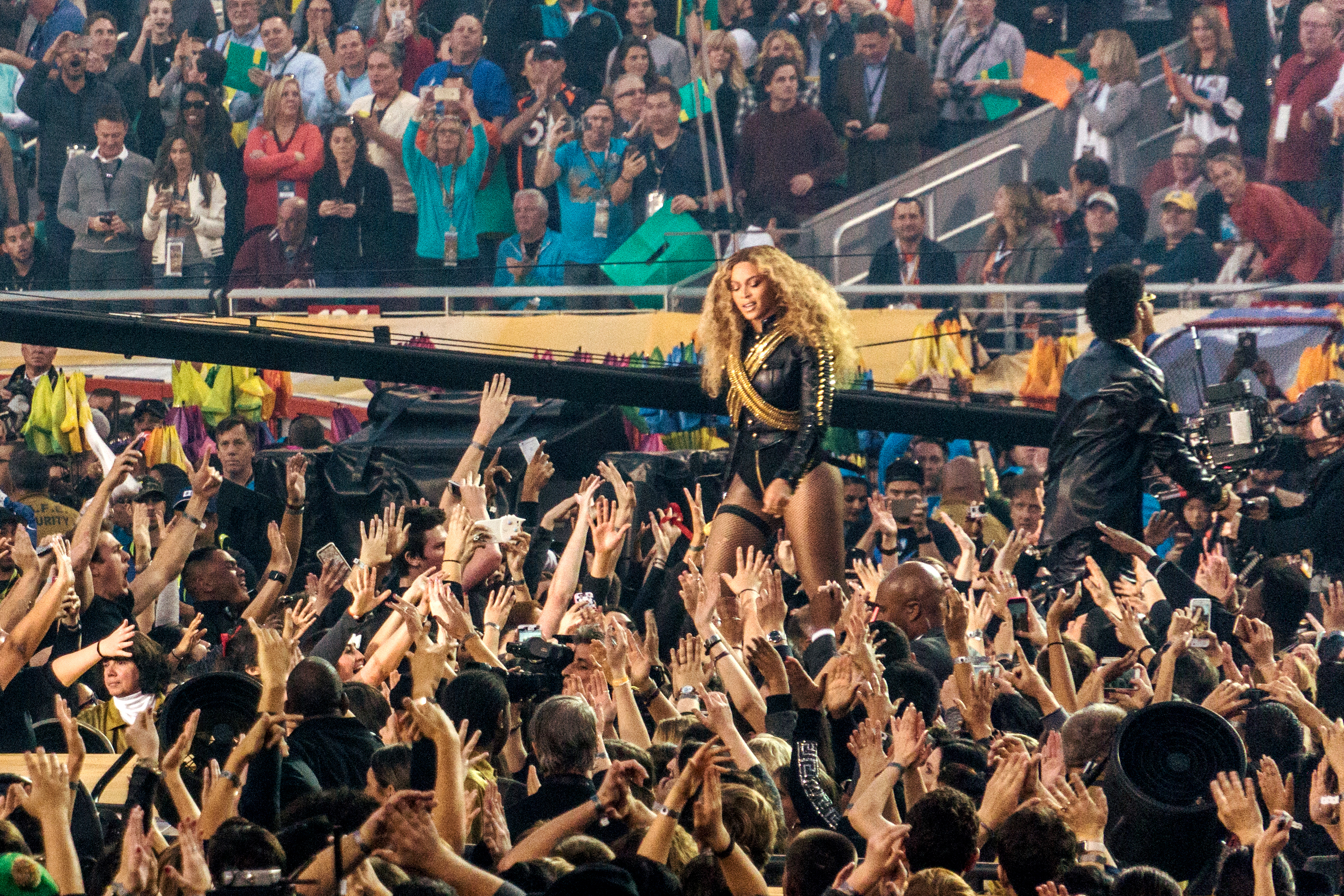
Beyoncé performing "Formation"

Beyoncé received criticism for the performance of "Formation", a song that right-wing politicians and activists considered to be "anti-police", and for appearing to align herself with the Black Lives Matter movement. Former New York City Mayor Rudy Giuliani accused the show of being anti-police and criticised Beyoncé's use of Black Power and Black Panther Party symbolism in her dance routine. The controversy caused a "#BoycottBeyonce" hashtag on Twitter and protesters announced plans for an "anti-Beyoncé" rally outside the NFL's headquarters in New York City, but no one showed up. CNN's Sally Kohn commented that "too many police continue to show themselves to be far more interested in reactionary defensiveness and preserving the abusive status quo". Professor and activist Melina Abdullah praised Beyoncé and other artists who "are willing to raise social consciousness and use their artistry to advance social justice". In addressing her own controversy, Beyoncé explained, "I have so much admiration and respect for officers and the families of officers who sacrifice themselves to keep us safe. But let's be clear: I am against police brutality and injustice". Coldplay were accused by conservatives of promoting a gay agenda at the end of the show, when rainbow-coloured placards were flipped to form the phrase "Believe in love".

=== Rankings ===
List of critic rankings
Publication	Year	Description	Result	Ref.
The A.V. Club	2023	Every Super Bowl Halftime Show from the Last 30 Years, Ranked	15	
The Athletic	2023	Super Bowl Halftime Shows Ranked	3	
Athlon Sports	2022	Ranking Every Super Bowl Halftime Show	11	
Billboard	2020	Best Super Bowl Halftime Shows Ever	10	
E! Online	2022	20 Unforgettable Super Bowl Halftime Show Performances	19	
Entertainment Tonight	2022	The Most Unforgettable Super Bowl Halftime Shows	6	
Glamour UK	2018	The Most Memorable Super Bowl Performances of All Time	Placed	
Looper	2026	15 Best Super Bowl Halftime Shows, Ranked	15	
The New York Times	2026	5 Super Bowl Halftime Shows That Sparked Controversies	Placed	
O Globo	2017	The Most Memorable Super Bowl Halftime Shows	Placed	
The Oregonian	2022	The 10 Best Super Bowl Halftime Shows of All Time	5	
Parade	2019	The 10 Best Super Bowl Halftime Shows of All Time	10	
Radio X	2026	The Most Memorable Super Bowl Half-Time Performances	Placed	
The Recording Academy	2025	8 Memorable Super Bowl Halftime Performances	Placed	
Revolt	2024	8 Best Super Bowl Performances	3	
Rolling Stone	2021	Every Super Bowl Halftime Show, Ranked from Worst to Best	14	
San Francisco Chronicle	2026	7 Most Controversial Super Bowl Halftime Shows	Placed	
Sports Illustrated	2019	The Best Super Bowl Halftime Shows of All Time	Placed	
The Telegraph	2021	21 Unforgettable Super Bowl Halftime Shows	2	
Thrillist	2022	The Greatest Super Bowl Halftime Shows of All Time	22	
Time Out	2023	These are the Best Super Bowl Halftime Shows of All Time	9	
Vulture	2022	Every Super Bowl Halftime Show Since 1993, Ranked	9	
TheWrap	2017	10 All Time Best Super Bowl Halftime Shows	3	
Yardbarker	2024	Super Bowl Halftime Shows of 21st Century, Ranked	3	
YouGov	2020	The Best Super Bowl Halftime Shows of the Past Decade (2010–2019)	3	

== Accolades ==
List of awards and nominations
Year	Ceremony	Category	Result	Ref.
2016	Primetime Emmy Awards	Outstanding Special Class Program	Nominated	
2016	Primetime Emmy Awards	Outstanding Lighting Design / Lighting Direction for a Variety Special	Nominated	

== Commercial impact ==
According to Billboard, the halftime show got 115.5 million total viewers, becoming the most watched performance by a group. Moreover, all seven albums Coldplay had released at the time entered the United States albums chart; A Head Full of Dreams (2015) ranked the highest, at number four. The band also experienced a 174% surge in digital song sales, with the strongest seller being "Adventure of a Lifetime". Doo-Wops & Hooligans (2010) and Unorthodox Jukebox (2012), both from Bruno Mars, saw increases in sales as well. Despite not charting any albums, Beyoncé entered the Hot R&B Songs ranking with "Formation" at number 18.

== Set list ==
Credits adapted from Billboard.

1. "Yellow"
2. "Viva la Vida"
3. "Paradise"
4. "Adventure of a Lifetime"
5. "Uptown Funk" / "Formation" (Mark Ronson, Bruno Mars and Beyoncé)
6. "Fix You" / "Up&Up" (with Mars and Beyoncé)

Notes

- "Uptown Funk" / "Formation" included elements of "U Can't Touch This" and "Crazy in Love".
- "Fix You" / "Up&Up" included elements of "Clocks", "Midnight", "Independent Women Part I", "Just the Way You Are", "Purple Rain" and "Beautiful Day".

== See also ==
- 2016 in American music
- 2016 in American television
