= The Domino State =

English alternative rock band from London

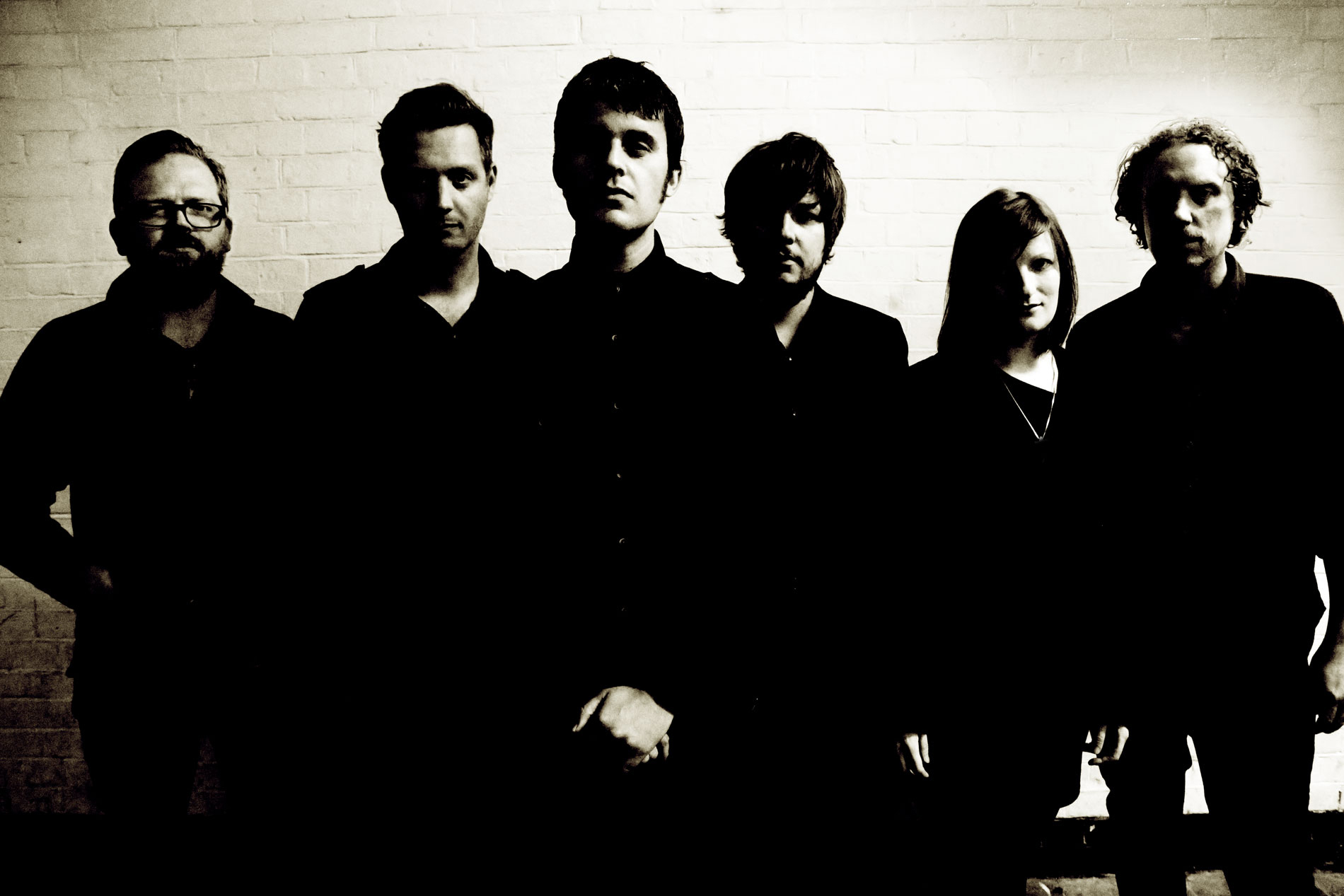
- The Domino State. L-R; James Machin, Wil Padley, Matt Forder, Rich Simic, Carrie White, Tim Buckland.

Background information
- Origin: London, England
- Genres: Alternative rock; indie
- Years active: 2007–present
- Label: Unsigned/Own Label/Exhibition Records
- Members: Matt Forder; James Machin; Wil Padley; Rich Simic; Carrie White
- Past members: Tim Buckland
- Website: thedominostate.com

The Domino State are an English alternative rock band from London, England. The band have released two albums; Uneasy Lies The Crown in 2010 and Open Heart World in 2014. One of their guitarists, Tim Buckland, is credited with teaching his younger brother, Jonny Buckland (of Coldplay) how to play guitar.

== History ==
The Domino State started out from a previous London based band called 'At The Lake' who released two singles on the Poptones label; "These Days" in 2005 and "I Made My Excuses and Left" in 2006. The group disbanded when their original bass player left and moved to Australia. The three remaining members of Matt Forder, James Machin and Tim Buckland formed a new band with Wil Padley and Rich Simic.

Through the familial connection of Jonny Buckland the band garnered attention with opening slots in front of 20,000 people at the 0_{2} Arena on Coldplay's 2008 world tour. The band also supported M83, The Boxer Rebellion and Longview. The Domino State have also played at the Glastonbury Festival. The band released their first album, Uneasy Lies the Crown in 2010 on the Exhibition label.

They recruited a violinist, Carrie White and in December 2014 released their follow up album Open Heart World on a free/pay what you like download on the band's official website.

== Reviews and press ==
The single "Firefly" has been described by Gordon Bruce of The Skinny as "a slow-burning epic from start to finish that goes absolutely nowhere," whereas ClickMusic said that it was "a rich zealous song, almost anthemic with its intense musical backdrop". Uneasy Lies the Crown has been noted as being "a bold opening statement, it’s one of the best debuts to hit the streets" in 2010. Paul Lockett of [sic] Magazine said of Open Heart World, "on the evidence of this album, I’d certainly expect them to win lots of converts across the European festival circuit. Their sound is polished, layered, lush, ethereal even". Elsewhere, Echoes and Dust noted what was comforting "is the fact that the band have not attempted to move away from that lovely, deep, sophisticated sound, where Matt Forder’s distinctive, velveteen vocal sits perfectly".

== Discography ==
=== Albums ===
- Uneasy Lies the Crown (16 August 2010)
- Open Heart World (15 December 2014)

=== EPs ===
- EP01 (1 March 2008)

=== Singles ===
- "Iron Mask" (1 October 2007)
- "What's the Question" (7 April 2008)
- "Firefly" (30 June 2009)
- "We Must Not Shut Ourselves Away" (12 July 2010)
- "You are the Winter" (7 March 2011)
- "Your Love" (20 April 2013)

=== Music videos ===
- "Firefly" (30 June 2009)
- "We Must Not Shut Ourselves Away" (12 July 2010)
- "You are the Winter" (7 March 2011)
