= Hymn for the Weekend =

2016 single by Coldplay

Single by Coldplay

from the album A Head Full of Dreams
- Released: 25 January 2016
- Recorded: 2015
- Studio: Henson (Los Angeles); Woodshed (Malibu)
- Genre: Alternative R&B; art pop; indie rock; pop rock; alternative pop
- Length: 4:18 (album version); 3:47 (radio edit)
- Label: Parlophone; Atlantic
- Songwriters: Guy Berryman; Jonny Buckland; Will Champion; Chris Martin
- Producers: Rik Simpson; Stargate; Digital Divide

Coldplay singles chronology
"Adventure of a Lifetime" (2015)	"Hymn for the Weekend" (2016)	"Up&Up" (2016)

Music video
- "Hymn for the Weekend" on YouTube

"Hymn for the Weekend" is a song by British rock band Coldplay, featuring uncredited guest vocals from American singer Beyoncé. It was released on 25 January 2016 as the second single from the band’s seventh studio album, A Head Full of Dreams (2015). Blending elements of pop, alternative rock, and R&B, the track marked a stylistic shift towards a more vibrant sound. The song received overall positive reviews from music critics and achieved commercial success worldwide, reaching the top ten in multiple countries. Its music video, filmed in various locations across India, attracted attention for its colourful imagery and sparked discussions surrounding cultural representation.

"Hymn for the Weekend" reached number six on the UK Singles Chart and also reached the top twenty in countries such as Switzerland, Ireland, France, Sweden, Austria, Belgium, Italy and Spain. In the US, with the Seeb remix, the song reached number 25 on the US Billboard Hot 100 in October 2016. A music video for the song was released on 29 January 2016 and features Coldplay in various cities in India, with Beyoncé performing in some scenes. It also featured Indian actress Sonam Kapoor in a brief role.

== Background ==
The song was debuted on Annie Mac's BBC radio show on 30 November 2015. According to Berryman, lead singer Chris Martin originally wanted the song to be a party song with the lyrics "drinks on me, drinks on me", but his bandmates didn't think that would go well with their fans. Martin's longtime friend Beyoncé was asked to sing on the song, and she accepted the request.

Martin corroborated Berryman's story about the band protesting him singing, "Drinks on me, drinks on me" in an interview with The Wall Street Journal. According to Martin, the original kernel was that he "was listening to Flo Rida or something", and he thought, "it's such a shame that Coldplay could never have one of those late-night club songs, like 'Turn Down for What'. I thought I'd like to have a song called 'Drinks on Me' where you sit on the side of a club and buy everyone drinks because you're so fucking cool," Martin recalled. "I was chuckling about that, when this melody came, 'drinks on me, drinks on me', then the rest of the song came out. I presented it to the rest of the band and they said, 'We love this song, but there's no way you can sing "drinks on me".' So that changed into 'drink from me' and the idea of having an angelic person in your life. Then that turned into asking Beyoncé to sing on it."

== Composition ==
"Hymn for the Weekend" is written in the key of C minor set in a 4/4 time signature at a moderate tempo of 90 beats per minute.

== Music video ==
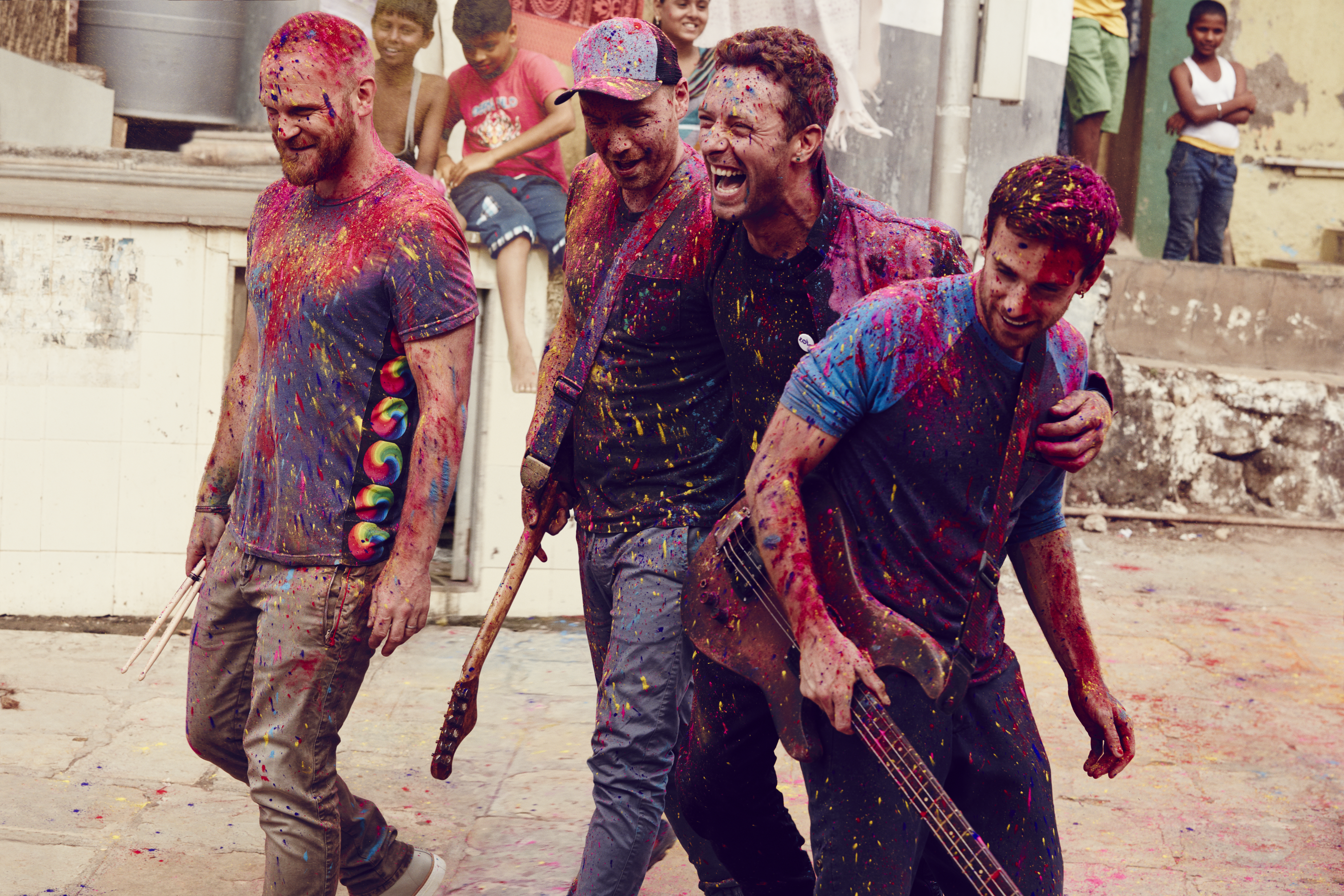
Coldplay during the filming of their "Hymn for the Weekend" music video in 2015

According to The Times of India, the music video was shot in October 2015 at various Indian cities including Worli Village, Mumbai, and Kolkata. The fort showcased at the start and in between is Fort Vasai in Vasai, Mumbai. Scenes were also shot at the Maratha Mandir theatre, which is known for showcasing a single film, Dilwale Dulhania Le Jayenge, for over 22 years. The video is themed after the Holi festival and was directed by Ben Mor, being released on 29 January 2016. It features Beyoncé and Sonam Kapoor.

== Critical reception ==
"Hymn for the Weekend" received generally positive reviews from critics. Jody Rosen of Billboard called it "the album's grooviest". Helen Brown of The Daily Telegraph wrote: "Beyoncé makes more of her appearance on 'Hymn for the Weekend', bringing her chunky harmonies and no-nonsense brass section to a peppy little excursion into indie R&B which opens with a paradisiacal fanfare and finds Martin dropping out of his falsetto autopilot into a more raw voice". Sarah Rodman of The Boston Globe wrote "it's with the third track, 'Hymn for the Weekend', that the album truly lifts off on the wings of an angelic choir (including Beyoncé), a swaggering piano, and a euphoric, lightly funky track bolstering Martin's exclamations of feeling high."

In a mixed review, Carl Williot of Idolator wrote, "The Beyoncé-assisted 'Hymn for the Weekend' almost equals (the album's) energy, but it lacks the drama of 'Princess of China'", adding, that as a track featuring Beyoncé "you'd expect a show-stopping moment." He concluded "the guys sound like total goobers trying to do the club swagger thing, like a drunk dad doing the rap dance du jour at a wedding". 3voor12 ranked it among the best songs of the year.

== Commercial performance ==
With over 2.67 billion views on YouTube, "Hymn for the Weekend" is Coldplay's most-viewed music video and the second-most overall, behind the lyric video for "Something Just Like This". Luminate reported the song "had the most total combined audio and video streams globally in 2022", with 35.9 million views coming from Canada, and 434.5 million from the United States. In 2024, PPL ranked it as the band's sixth-most played song across radio and television in the United Kingdom.

== In other media ==
The song was made available as downloadable content for Rock Band 4.

== Live performance ==
The song was performed for the first time during the 2016 Brit Awards on 24 February 2016.

== Track listing ==
Digital download
No.	Title	Length
1.	"Hymn for the Weekend"	4:18

Digital download (Radio Edit)
No.	Title	Length
1.	"Hymn for the Weekend" (Radio Edit)	4:00

Digital download (SeeB Remix)
No.	Title	Length
1.	"Hymn for the Weekend" (SeeB Remix)	3:32

Only YouTube (Alan Walker Remix)
No.	Title	Length
1.	"Hymn for the Weekend" (Alan Walker Remix)	3:50

== Credits and personnel ==
Credits are adapted from A Head Full of Dreams liner notes.

Coldplay

- Guy Berryman – bass guitar
- Jonny Buckland – electric guitar, backing vocals
- Will Champion – drums, drum pad, percussion, backing vocals
- Chris Martin – lead vocals, piano

Additional musicians

- Regiment Horns – bass
- Beyoncé – guest vocals
- Avicii – additional programming

== Charts ==
=== Weekly charts ===
Weekly chart performance
Chart (2016–2025)	Peak position
Argentina Hot 100 (Billboard)	89
Argentina Airplay (Monitor Latino)	12
Australia (ARIA)	24
Austria (Ö3 Austria Top 40)	10
Belgium (Ultratop 50 Flanders)	5
Belgium (Ultratop 50 Wallonia)	2
Canada Hot 100 (Billboard)	32
CIS Airplay (TopHit)	2
Croatia International Airplay (Top lista)	1
Czech Republic Airplay (ČNS IFPI)	17
Czech Republic Singles Digital (ČNS IFPI)	2
Denmark (Tracklisten)	20
Ecuador (National-Report)	13
Finland (Suomen virallinen lista)	15
France (SNEP)	3
Germany (GfK)	11
Greece Digital (Billboard)	3
Greece International (IFPI)	18
Hungary (Rádiós Top 40)	34
Hungary (Single Top 40)	4
Hungary (Stream Top 40)	8
Iceland (RÚV)	1
Ireland (IRMA)	7
Israel International Airplay (Media Forest)	1
Italy (FIMI)	2
Italy Airplay (EarOne)	1
Lebanon (The Official Lebanese Top 20)	1
Mexico (Billboard Ingles Airplay)	4
Malaysia (Billboard)	15
Malaysia International (RIM)	12
Netherlands (Dutch Top 40)	11
Netherlands (Single Top 100)	18
New Zealand Heatseekers (RMNZ)	3
Norway (VG-lista)	13
Poland Airplay (ZPAV)	1
Portugal (AFP)	9
Russia Airplay (TopHit)	1
Scottish Singles Sales (Official Charts)	4
Serbia Airplay (Radiomonitor)	5
Singapore (RIAS)	5
Slovakia Airplay (ČNS IFPI)	1
Slovakia Singles Digital (ČNS IFPI)	6
Slovenia Airplay (SloTop50)	10
South Africa Airplay (EMA)	3
South Korea International (Gaon)	24
Spain (Promusicae)	5
Sweden (Sverigetopplistan)	2
Switzerland (Schweizer Hitparade)	7
UK Singles (Official Charts)	6
Ukraine Airplay (TopHit)	18
United Arab Emirates (IFPI)	9
US Billboard Hot 100	25
US Adult Contemporary (Billboard)	19
US Adult Pop Airplay (Billboard)	6
US Dance Club Songs (Billboard)	3
US Hot Rock & Alternative Songs (Billboard)	4
US Pop Airplay (Billboard)	18
US Rock & Alternative Airplay (Billboard)	11

=== Monthly charts ===
Monthly chart performance
Chart (2017)	Peak position
South Korea International (Gaon)	54

=== Year-end charts ===
Year-end chart performance
Chart (2016)	Position
Argentina (Monitor Latino)	26
Australia (ARIA)	79
Austria (Ö3 Austria Top 40)	23
Belgium (Ultratop Flanders)	24
Belgium (Ultratop Wallonia)	3
Brazil (Brasil Hot 100)	66
CIS (Tophit)	10
Denmark (Tracklisten)	30
France (SNEP)	12
Germany (Official German Charts)	28
Hungary (Rádiós Top 40)	74
Hungary (Single Top 40)	15
Iceland (Plötutíóindi)	2
Israel (Media Forest)	2
Italy (FIMI)	4
Italy Airplay (EarOne)	13
Netherlands (Dutch Top 40)	51
Netherlands (Single Top 100)	20
Poland (ZPAV)	2
Russia Airplay (Tophit)	6
Spain (PROMUSICAE)	11
Sweden (Sverigetopplistan)	9
Switzerland (Schweizer Hitparade)	8
Ukraine Airplay (Tophit)	61
UK Singles (Official Charts Company)	21
US Billboard Hot 100	73
US Adult Top 40 (Billboard)	26
US Hot Rock Songs (Billboard)	7

Chart (2017)	Position
Brazil (Pro-Música Brasil)	104
France (SNEP)	159
Switzerland (Schweizer Hitparade)	97
US Hot Rock Songs (Billboard)	36

=== Decade-end charts ===
Decade-end chart performance
Chart (2010–2019)	Position
Norway (VG-lista)	31

== Certifications and sales ==
Certifications and sales
Region	Certification	Certified units/sales
Australia (ARIA)	8× Platinum	560,000^{‡}
Austria (IFPI Austria)	Gold	15,000^{‡}
Belgium (BRMA)	Platinum	20,000^{‡}
Canada (Music Canada)	3× Platinum	240,000^{‡}
Denmark (IFPI Danmark)	3× Platinum	270,000^{‡}
France	—	55,700 (Note: French year-end sales for "Hymn for the Weekend" in 2016.)
Germany (BVMI)	2× Platinum	800,000^{‡}
Italy (FIMI)	8× Platinum	400,000^{‡}
New Zealand (RMNZ)	4× Platinum	120,000^{‡}
Poland (ZPAV)	Diamond	100,000^{‡}
Portugal (AFP)	4× Platinum	80,000^{‡}
Spain (Promusicae)	4× Platinum	240,000^{‡}
Sweden (GLF)	Platinum	40,000^{‡}
Switzerland (IFPI Switzerland)	2× Platinum	60,000^{‡}
United Kingdom (BPI)	4× Platinum	2,400,000^{‡}
United States (RIAA)	5× Platinum	5,000,000^{‡}
Streaming
Greece (IFPI Greece)	2× Platinum	4,000,000^{†}
^{‡} Sales+streaming figures based on certification alone.^{†} Streaming-only figures based on certification alone.

== Release history ==
Release dates and formats
Region	Date	Format	Version	Label	Ref.
Various	25 January 2016	Digital download	Seeb remix	Parlophone	
Italy	5 February 2016	Contemporary hit radio	Original	Warner	
United States	26 April 2016	Contemporary hit radio	Original	Atlantic	

== Cover versions ==
In 2026, Italian composer Giacomo Bucci released an orchestral version of "Hymn for the Weekend" on his album Mainstream Overtures.

== See also ==
- List of number-one singles of 2016 (Poland)
- List of top 10 singles in 2016 (France)
- List of UK top-ten singles in 2016
- List of number-one songs of the 2010s (Slovakia)
