= Everglow (song) =

2016 single by Coldplay

Single by Coldplay

from the album A Head Full of Dreams
- Released: 11 November 2016
- Recorded: 2014–15
- Genre: Soft rock
- Length: 4:42 (album version); 5:01 (single version); 3:48 (radio edit)
- Label: Parlophone; Atlantic
- Songwriters: Guy Berryman; Jonny Buckland; Will Champion; Chris Martin
- Producers: Rik Simpson; Stargate

Coldplay singles chronology
"A Head Full of Dreams" (2016)	"Everglow" (2016)	"Something Just Like This" (2017)

Music video
- "Everglow" on YouTube

"Everglow" is a song by British rock band Coldplay. It is the fourth track from their seventh studio album, A Head Full of Dreams. It features uncredited vocals by Gwyneth Paltrow, who at the time was married to Chris Martin despite their separation being announced in 2014. The track premiered during Zane Lowe's Beats 1 radio show on 26 November 2015, and originally made available as a promotional single for the album on 27 November 2015. Variance ranked it among the best songs of the year.

On 11 November 2016, the song was released as the fifth and final single from A Head Full of Dreams through a new stripped-down version, which was inspired by Martin's unrehearsed solo performance of the song at the Glastonbury Festival. This recording ends with a sample of Muhammad Ali's 1977 speech in Newcastle upon Tyne.

== Composition ==
The track revolves around a heartfelt piano riff and was written in the key of C♯ minor at 73 BPM and a chord progression that alternates between C♯m-A-E-G♯m7 and C♯m-A-E-B.

== Background ==
Martin came up with the idea for the title of the song from a slang word he heard from a surfer. In an interview with Zane Lowe, he explained the origin of the phrase: "I was in the ocean one day with this surfer guy, who spoke just like you'd imagine a surfer guy to speak … This guy spoke like Sean Penn's character from Fast Times at Ridgemont High. He was like, 'Yo dude, I was doing this thing the other day man, it gave me this total everglow!'"

== Live performance ==
The song was debuted during the iHeartRadio album release party of A Head Full of Dreams, on 19 November 2015. On 26 June 2016, Coldplay performed at Glastonbury Festival and after introducing the band, Chris Martin announced they were going to play Everglow. Martin's piano was out of tune resulting in him stopping the song and doing it a key down, resulting in him playing the song with the piano, without the other members of the band. Days later, on 3 July 2016, the band started to play that stripped back version of Everglow, and on 11 November 2016, it was released as the final single of the album because of how much they liked the live performance.

== Music video ==
An initial video directed by Joe Connor was filmed at the Eisstadion am Pferdeturm in Hanover on 30 June 2016, but was unreleased. This video was leaked online in 2017. Another video filmed by Ben Mor, featuring Chris Martin performing the song on a grand piano, was released on 9 December 2016.

== Track listing ==
Digital download
No.	Title	Length
1.	"Everglow"	4:43

Digital download
No.	Title	Length
1.	"Everglow" (Single Version) (Radio Edit)	3:47
2.	"Everglow" (Single Version)	5:01

== Personnel ==
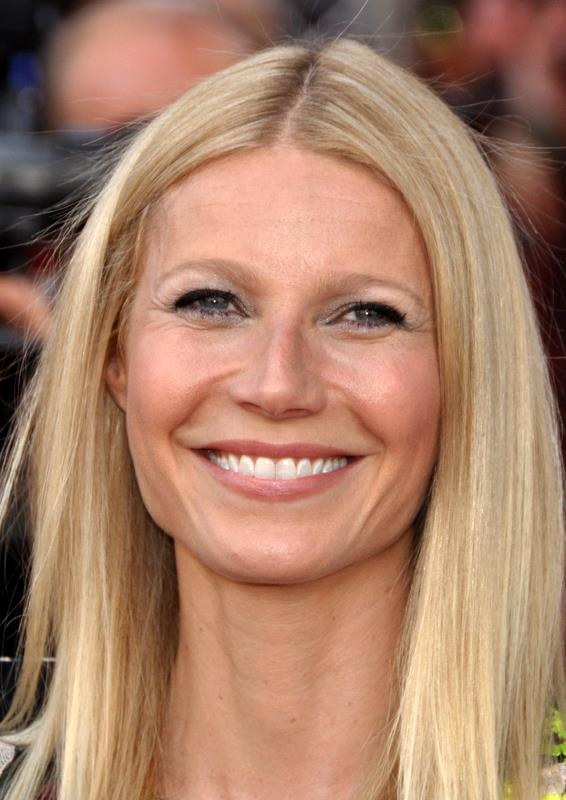
The song features Martin's ex-wife Gwyneth Paltrow.

Credits are adapted from A Head Full of Dreams liner notes.

Coldplay

- Guy Berryman – bass guitar
- Jonny Buckland – guitar
- Will Champion – drums, drum pad, percussion, backing vocals
- Chris Martin – lead vocals, piano

Additional musicians

- Mikkel S Eriksen – additional instruments, production, mixing
- Tor Erik Hermansen – additional instruments, production, mixing
- Gwyneth Paltrow – backing vocals
- Davide Rossi – strings
- Rik Simpson – additional instruments, backing vocals, mixing

== Charts ==
=== Weekly charts ===
Weekly chart performance
Chart (2015–2024)	Peak position
Australia (ARIA)	93
Austria (Ö3 Austria Top 40)	44
Belgium (Ultratop 50 Flanders)	37
Belgium (Ultratip Bubbling Under Wallonia)	4
Canada Hot 100 (Billboard)	66
Czech Republic Singles Digital (ČNS IFPI)	63
France (SNEP)	28
Germany (GfK)	42
Hungary (Single Top 40)	21
Iceland (RÚV)	8
Ireland (IRMA)	55
Italy (FIMI)	35
Netherlands (Dutch Top 40)	16
Netherlands (Single Top 100)	25
New Zealand Heatseekers (RMNZ)	10
Norway (VG-lista)	23
Portugal (AFP)	56
Singapore (RIAS)	25
Slovakia Singles Digital (ČNS IFPI)	55
South Korea International (Gaon)	10
Spain (Promusicae)	23
Sweden (Sverigetopplistan)	62
Switzerland (Schweizer Hitparade)	16
UK Singles (Official Charts)	52
US Bubbling Under Hot 100 (Billboard)	6
US Hot Rock & Alternative Songs (Billboard)	8

=== Monthly charts ===
Monthly chart performance
Chart (2017)	Peak position
South Korea International (Gaon)	22

=== Year-end charts ===
Year-end chart performance
Chart (2016)	Position
South Korea International (Gaon)	73
US Hot Rock Songs (Billboard)	88

Chart (2017)	Position
South Korea International (Gaon)	44

Chart (2018)	Position
South Korea International (Gaon)	54

== Certifications and sales ==
Certifications and sales
Region	Certification	Certified units/sales
Australia (ARIA)	Platinum	70,000^{‡}
Canada (Music Canada)	Gold	40,000^{‡}
Denmark (IFPI Danmark)	Platinum	90,000^{‡}
Italy (FIMI)	Platinum	50,000^{‡}
New Zealand (RMNZ)	Platinum	30,000^{‡}
Poland (ZPAV)	Gold	25,000^{‡}
South Korea	—	413,596 (Note: South Korean year-end digital sales for "Everglow" in 2016 and 2017.)
Spain (Promusicae)	Gold	30,000^{‡}
United Kingdom (BPI)	Platinum	600,000^{‡}
^{‡} Sales+streaming figures based on certification alone.

== Release history ==
Release history and formats
Region	Date	Format	Label	Ref.
Various	26 November 2015	Digital download	Parlophone	(Note: Release as a promotional single.)
Various	11 November 2016	Digital download	Parlophone	
United Kingdom	24 November 2016	Contemporary hit radio	Parlophone	
