= Coldplay: A Head Full of Dreams =

2018 music documentary about Coldplay

- Theatrical release poster
- Directed by: Mat Whitecross
- Based on: Coldplay
- Produced by: Hannah Clark; Fiona Neilson; Stefan Demetriou
- Starring: Guy Berryman; Jonny Buckland; Will Champion; Phil Harvey; Chris Martin
- Cinematography: Marcus Haney
- Edited by: Marc Richardson
- Music by: Coldplay; Rael Jones
- Production companies: Mint Pictures; My Accomplice; The Firepit
- Distributed by: Trafalgar Releasing
- Release date: 14 November 2018
- Running time: 115 minutes
- Country: United Kingdom
- Language: English
- Box office: $3.5 million

Coldplay: A Head Full of Dreams is a music documentary directed by Mat Whitecross about British band Coldplay, documenting their beginnings and rise to fame. The film received a single-day release on 14 November 2018 in select cinemas globally and was made available to stream on Amazon Video two days later. It combines previously unseen footage along with performance takes from the A Head Full of Dreams Tour. It was met with generally mixed reviews upon release.

== Production ==
The film documents the band's history, from their first rehearsal in a student bedroom to their A Head Full of Dreams Tour. It was filmed over 20 years by longtime friend of the group Mat Whitecross and was compiled after he had directed Oasis documentary Supersonic. In an interview with Vulture, Whitecross revealed that the lead singer of Coldplay, Chris Martin, was unenthusiastic about the idea of a film being made about the band. Martin eventually allowed it to be made, but was unwilling to watch it himself.

== Release ==
Coldplay announced the documentary on their official website on 12 October 2018. The film was released worldwide in 2,650 cinemas in more than 70 countries for a single day, 14 November 2018. It grossed $3.5 million worldwide, selling more than 300,000 tickets and reached number 1 at the box office in the Netherlands, number 2 in the United Kingdom, Australia and Italy and number 5 in the United States. It was available to stream on Amazon Video two days later after three live songs had been premiered on Amazon Music on 26 October. The film is also included as a DVD in Coldplay's sixth compilation album, The Butterfly Package (2018).

== Reception ==
On review aggregator website Rotten Tomatoes, the film holds an approval rating of 67% based on 6 reviews, and an average rating of 6.5/10. On Metacritic, the film has a weighted average of 64 out of 100 based on 4 critics, indicating "generally favorable reviews".

Peter Bradshaw, writing for The Guardian, gave the film three stars out of five and wrote "This is a watchable, if blandly celebratory and unchallenging portrait of a massive rock institution." Time Out's Phil de Semlyen gave the documentary the same score, saying "It may not win over the haters but this Coldplay doc-stroke-concert film packs in plenty of story and spectacle." Owen Gleiberman was generally disappointed with the film, writing "Mat Whitestone [sic] shot footage of Coldplay for 20 years. His kaleidoscopic rock doc shows you a lot but reveals too little of the band's pop passion" and added "Even if you're a fan of the band (which I am), the movie may leave you wanting."

David Ehrlich of IndieWire gave the film a B+ grade, saying "While nothing in your life may come as easily to you as everything in Coldplay’s lives seems to have come to them, this delightful and unexpectedly inspiring documentary has a funny way of making your dreams seem closer than they might appear." Ben Travis, writing for Empire, gave the film three out of five, summarized his review thus: "Mat Whitecross draws compelling lines between Coldplay’s past and present in a documentary as colourful and optimistic as its namesake album. It’s one for the fans—even the ones too reluctant to admit that they are." Junkee and E! Online listed it among the best live music films available on streaming.

== See also ==
- List of British films of 2018
- List of highest-grossing concert films
