= Adventure of a Lifetime =

2015 single by Coldplay

Single by Coldplay

from the album A Head Full of Dreams
- Released: 6 November 2015
- Genre: Disco; psychedelic pop; funk; Afro-pop; pop rock
- Length: 4:23 (album version); 3:43 (radio edit)
- Label: Parlophone; Atlantic
- Songwriters: Guy Berryman; Jonny Buckland; Will Champion; Mikkel Eriksen; Tor Hermansen; Chris Martin
- Producers: Rik Simpson; Stargate

Coldplay singles chronology
"Ink" (2014)	"Adventure of a Lifetime" (2015)	"Hymn for the Weekend" (2016)

Music video
- "Adventure of a Lifetime" on YouTube

"Adventure of a Lifetime" is a song by British rock band Coldplay. It was released on 6 November 2015 as the lead single from their seventh studio album, A Head Full of Dreams (2015). The track reached number seven on the UK Singles Chart and number 13 on the Billboard Hot 100. It also reached the top 20 in a number of countries, including Australia, Austria, Canada, Czech Republic, France, Germany, Ireland, Italy, the Netherlands, New Zealand, and Switzerland.

== Music video ==
The official music video was directed by the band's long-time collaborator, Mat Whitecross. It was released on 29 November 2015. The concept for the video was hatched after Coldplay frontman Chris Martin and British motion capture expert/actor Andy Serkis met on a plane and discussed ideas. It took about six months to make the music video, which as of March 2025 has received over 1.6 billion views on YouTube.

=== Synopsis ===
The CGI animated video features a group of chimpanzees that come across a Beats Pill speaker under a pile of leaves. The primates then discover the power of music and form a band that resembles the members of Coldplay.

The video begins with a similar layout with Coldplay's 2011 music video, "Paradise". As it opens, four chimpanzees (played by the band members) are sitting in a forest. The opening verses begin after a chimpanzee (played by Jonny Buckland) finds a Beats Pill speaker under a pile of leaves. Another chimpanzee (played by Chris Martin) listens to the music and calls the rest of the group (played by Guy Berryman and Will Champion) to gather. It then slaps its chest and jumps to a path inside the forest alone.

The character sings the song and swings on the willow tree vines. Then, the four chimpanzees dance together during the chorus. After the chorus, they find an electric guitar, a bass and a drum set. The chimpanzees bang on the instruments before they realize their proper use. The characters play the instruments and form an "ape band". Buckland's character gains a hat and Berryman's gains an earring.

During the bridge of the song, the band is surrounded by other chimpanzees (also played by the band). The rest of the video features the dance movements of the other chimpanzees and the performance of the ape band. At the end of the video, Martin's character climbs up to a tree and overlooks the view of the forest which also features some Indian temples, a reference to the Indian inspiration of the associated album, A Head Full of Dreams.

=== Background and production ===
According to The Guardian, the video was shot at The Imaginarium, where the reboot series of Planet of the Apes and parts of Avengers: Age of Ultron and Star Wars: The Force Awakens were filmed. English choreographer Holly Blakey was responsible for creating the band's dance moves.

Hannah Clark, the producer of the video commented, "As creatures go, chimps are one of the more difficult to animate. Not only are they quite human in their movement, but they are covered in hair. Add to this that we had no backgrounds shot, and we were asking an awful lot of any post-collaborator." The band's faces were covered in a special, reflective and light-catching make-up that allowed the computers to appropriately interpret the video feed and create renders of the chimpanzees' characters. The band members weren't playing real instruments, but similarly shaped objects that enabled creation of realistic body positions.

The animation, visual effects and motion design of the video was carried out by Mathematic – a Paris-based production company. Mat Whitecross filmed the band using a special camera. Each of band members also wore a head-mounted camera system that was configured into a three camera solution. The camera systems provided multiple video streams from which the production team was able to recreate 3D points.

=== Release ===
A 15-second teaser named "#AOALvideo November 27" was uploaded on the band's official YouTube account on 12 November 2015. The teaser consisted a short excerpt of the video, behind-the-scenes video and animated video of the single artwork. The geometric pattern and the representative pattern of the album, Flower of Life appeared at the end of the teaser. The music video was uploaded on the official page of the band at 8:00 a.m. (UK time) on 27 November 2015. On 29 November 2015, the video was uploaded on the official YouTube account.

== Commercial performance ==
In 2024, PPL ranked "Adventure of a Lifetime" as Coldplay's fifth-most played song across radio and television in the United Kingdom.

== Critical reception ==
=== Reviews ===
"Adventure of a Lifetime" received generally favourable reviews from music critics. Writing for Idolator, Bianca Gracie and Robbie Daw rated the song 7/10 and 8/10 respectively, stating that the song is "incredibly vibrant in an almost childlike, blissful way that gives such an energetic rush" and that it is "the best Coldplay single in seven years".

=== Rankings ===
List of critic rankings
Publication	Year	Description	Result	Ref.
3voor12	2015	Songs of the Year 2015	28	
Consequence	2015	Janine Schaults' Top 10 Songs of 2015	9	
Consequence	2017	Every Alternative Rock No. 1 Hit from Worst to Best	212	
KROQ-FM	2024	Top 500 Songs from the Last 30 Years	382	
Mondo Sonoro	2015	The 50 Best International Songs of 2015	50	
NME	2015	Songs of the Year 2015	19	
Jenesaispop	2015	Best Songs of 2015	86	
Rolling Stone	2015	50 Best Songs of 2015	41	

== In other media ==
- In 2015, the song was made available as downloadable content for the music video game Rock Band 4.
- In 2016, the song was performed at the Super Bowl 50 halftime show.
- In 2026, the song was featured on Grand Theft Auto VI, through the in-game radio station Flash FM.

== Track listing ==
Digital download
No.	Title	Length
1.	"Adventure of a Lifetime"	4:24

Digital download (Radio Edit)
No.	Title	Length
1.	"Adventure of a Lifetime" (Radio Edit)	3:43

Digital download (Matoma Remix)
No.	Title	Length
1.	"Adventure of a Lifetime" (Matoma Remix)	4:11

== Personnel ==
Credits are adapted from A Head Full of Dreams liner notes.

Coldplay

- Guy Berryman – bass guitar, keyboards
- Jonny Buckland – lead guitar, keyboards
- Will Champion – drums, programming, vocals
- Chris Martin – lead vocals, piano, acoustic guitar

Additional musicians

- Merry Clayton – backing vocals
- Mikkel Eriksen – additional instruments, production, mixing
- Tor Hermansen – additional instruments, production, mixing
- Phil Tan – audio mixer

== Charts ==
=== Weekly charts ===
Weekly chart performance
Chart (2015–2026)	Peak position
Argentina Anglo (Monitor Latino)	17
Australia (ARIA)	20
Austria (Ö3 Austria Top 40)	14
Belarus Airplay (Eurofest)	58
Belgium (Ultratop 50 Flanders)	5
Belgium (Ultratop 50 Wallonia)	2
Canada Hot 100 (Billboard)	11
Canada AC (Billboard)	1
CIS Airplay (TopHit)	3
Czech Republic Airplay (ČNS IFPI)	6
Czech Republic Singles Digital (ČNS IFPI)	9
Denmark (Tracklisten)	16
Finland (Suomen virallinen lista)	13
France (SNEP)	2
Germany (GfK)	5
Global Excl. US (Billboard)	185
Greece International (IFPI)	30
Hungary (Rádiós Top 40)	25
Hungary (Single Top 40)	5
Hungary (Stream Top 40)	12
Iceland (RÚV)	2
Ireland (IRMA)	8
Israel International Airplay (Media Forest)	1
Italy (FIMI)	3
Kazakhstan Airplay (TopHit)	95
Mexico (Billboard Mexican Airplay)	1
Mexico (Billboard Ingles Airplay)	1
Mexico Anglo (Monitor Latino)	1
Netherlands (Single Top 100)	11
Netherlands (Dutch Top 40)	8
New Zealand (Recorded Music NZ)	12
Norway (VG-lista)	22
Poland Airplay (ZPAV)	3
Portugal (AFP)	5
Romania TV Airplay (Media Forest)	4
Scottish Singles Sales (Official Charts)	8
Singapore (RIAS)	9
Slovakia Airplay (ČNS IFPI)	19
Slovakia Singles Digital (ČNS IFPI)	18
Slovenia (SloTop50)	1
South Africa Airplay (EMA)	2
South Korea International (Gaon)	37
Spain (Promusicae)	10
Sweden (Sverigetopplistan)	23
Switzerland (Schweizer Hitparade)	3
United Arab Emirates (IFPI)	17
UK Singles (Official Charts)	7
US Billboard Hot 100	13
US Hot Rock & Alternative Songs (Billboard)	2
US Adult Alternative Airplay (Billboard)	1
US Adult Contemporary (Billboard)	12
US Adult Pop Airplay (Billboard)	7
US Alternative Airplay (Billboard)	1
US Dance Club Songs (Billboard)	1
US Pop Airplay (Billboard)	35
US Rock & Alternative Airplay (Billboard)	2

=== Monthly charts ===
Monthly chart performance
Chart (2017)	Peak position
South Korea International (Gaon)	80

=== Year-end charts ===
Year-end chart performance
Chart (2015)	Position
France (SNEP)	148
Hungary (Single Top 40)	80
Italy (FIMI)	88
Netherlands (Dutch Top 40)	86
Netherlands (NPO 3FM)	90

Chart (2016)	Position
Argentina (Monitor Latino)	50
Belgium (Ultratop Flanders)	76
Belgium (Ultratop Wallonia)	39
Brazil (Brasil Hot 100)	30
Canada (Canadian Hot 100)	58
CIS (Tophit)	26
Denmark (Tracklisten)	65
France (SNEP)	87
Hungary (Rádiós Top 40)	39
Hungary (Single Top 40)	27
Israel Airplay (Media Forest)	20
Italy (FIMI)	34
Netherlands (Dutch Top 40)	56
Netherlands (Single Top 100)	66
Russia Airplay (Tophit)	23
Slovenia (SloTop50)	20
Spain (PROMUSICAE)	49
Switzerland (Schweizer Hitparade)	41
Ukraine Airplay (Tophit)	85
UK Singles (Official Charts Company)	42
US Billboard Hot 100	95
US Hot Rock Songs (Billboard)	10
US Adult Alternative Songs (Billboard)	4
US Adult Contemporary (Billboard)	29
US Adult Top 40 (Billboard)	27
US Alternative Songs (Billboard)	9
US Dance Club Songs (Billboard)	10
US Rock Airplay (Billboard)	8

Chart (2025)	Position
Chile Airplay (Monitor Latino)	95

== Certifications ==
Certifications
Region	Certification	Certified units/sales
Australia (ARIA)	3× Platinum	210,000^{‡}
Belgium (BRMA)	Gold	10,000^{‡}
Canada (Music Canada)	2× Platinum	160,000^{‡}
Denmark (IFPI Danmark)	2× Platinum	180,000^{‡}
France (SNEP)	Gold	66,666^{‡}
Germany (BVMI)	Platinum	400,000^{‡}
Italy (FIMI)	4× Platinum	200,000^{‡}
Mexico (AMPROFON)	Gold	30,000^{*}
New Zealand (RMNZ)	4× Platinum	120,000^{‡}
Poland (ZPAV)	2× Platinum	100,000^{‡}
Portugal (AFP)	2× Platinum	20,000^{‡}
Spain (Promusicae)	2× Platinum	80,000^{‡}
Sweden (GLF)	2× Platinum	80,000^{‡}
Switzerland (IFPI Switzerland)	Gold	15,000^{‡}
United Kingdom (BPI)	4× Platinum	2,400,000^{‡}
United States (RIAA)	3× Platinum	3,000,000^{‡}
^{*} Sales figures based on certification alone.^{‡} Sales+streaming figures based on certification alone.

== Release history ==
Release dates and formats
Region	Date	Format	Label	Ref.
United States	5 November 2015	Digital download	Parlophone	
Germany	6 November 2015	Digital download	Parlophone	
Italy	6 November 2015	Contemporary hit radio	Warner Music	
United Kingdom	6 November 2015	Digital download	Parlophone	
Germany	4 December 2015	Digital download (Radio edit)	Parlophone	
United Kingdom	4 December 2015	Digital download (Radio edit)	Parlophone	
Germany	5 February 2016	Digital download (Matoma remix)	Parlophone	
United Kingdom	5 February 2016	Digital download (Matoma remix)	Parlophone	
United States	5 February 2016	Digital download (Matoma remix)	Parlophone	
United States	9 February 2016	Contemporary hit radio	Atlantic	
Various	28 March 2016	Digital download (Yotto remix)	Parlophone	

== See also ==
- List of top 10 singles in 2015 (France)
- List of UK top-ten singles in 2015
- List of Billboard Dance Club Songs number ones of 2016
- List of number-one songs of 2016 (Mexico)
- List of number-one singles of 2016 (Slovenia)
- List of UK top-ten singles in 2016
- List of Billboard number-one adult alternative singles of the 2010s
