= Jonny Buckland =

British guitarist (born 1977)

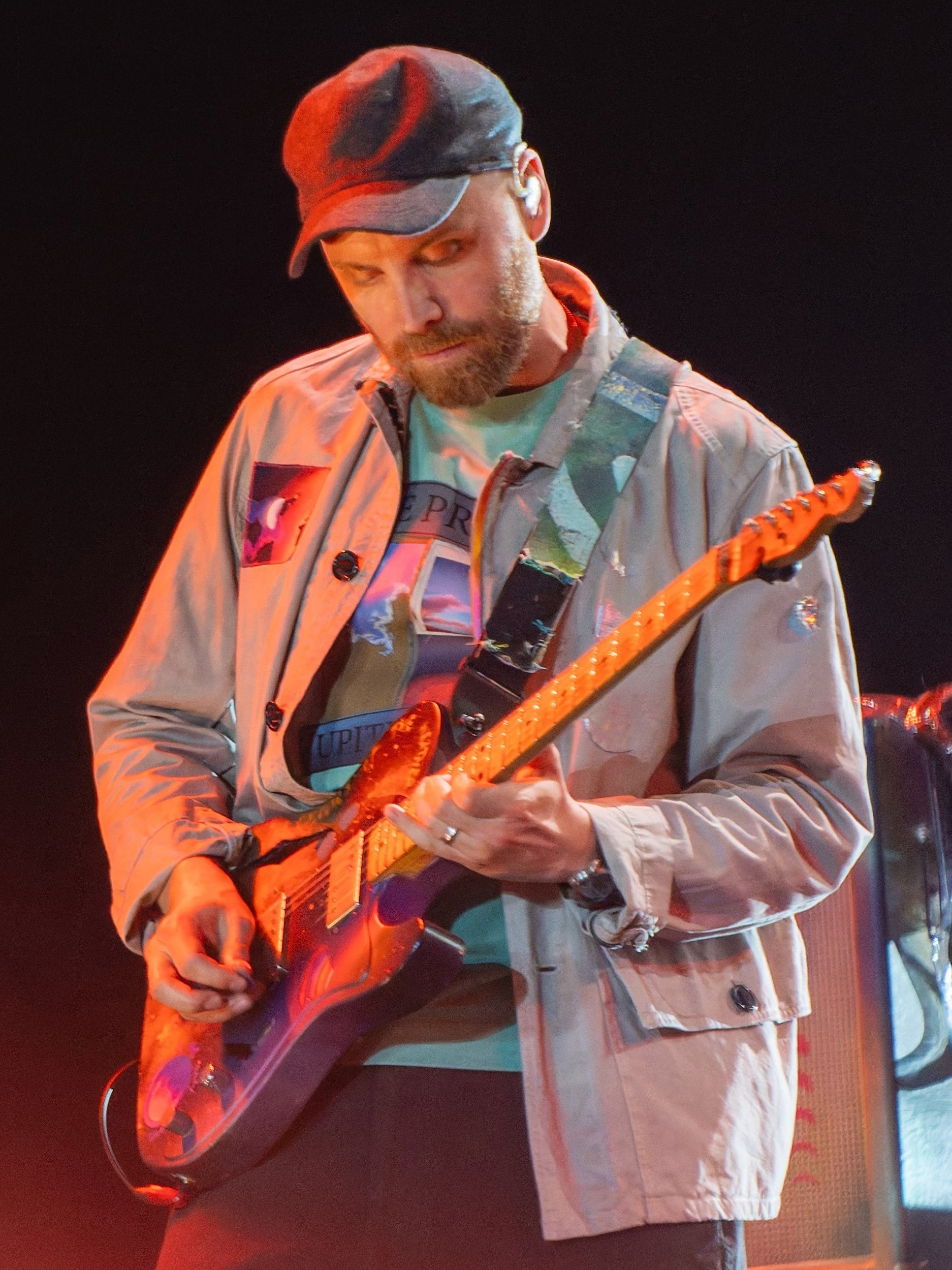
- Buckland at the Worthy Farm in 2024
- Born: Jonathan Mark Buckland; 11 September 1977 (age 49); London, England
- Education: University College London
- Occupations: Musician; songwriter
- Years active: 1997–present
- Spouse: Chloe Lee-Evans (m. 2009)
- Children: 2
- Awards: Full list
- Musical career
- Origin: London, England
- Genres: Alternative rock; pop rock; post-Britpop; pop
- Instruments: Guitar; keyboards; vocals
- Labels: Fierce Panda; Parlophone; Nettwerk; Capitol; Atlantic
- Member of: Coldplay

Jonathan Mark Buckland (born 11 September 1977) is a British musician and songwriter. He is best known as the lead guitarist and co-founder of the rock band Coldplay. Raised in Pantymwyn, Wales, he started to play guitar at an early age, taking inspiration from groups such as My Bloody Valentine, the Stone Roses and U2. His compositions are noted for being sparse and delicate, using delay pedals and slide bars with a timbre that led to comparisons to the Edge.

Buckland has a 2:1 degree in mathematics and astronomy from University College London, where he formed Coldplay along with Chris Martin, Guy Berryman and Will Champion. The band signed with Parlophone in 1999, finding global fame with Parachutes (2000) and subsequent albums. He received a total of seven Grammy Awards and nine Brit Awards as part of Coldplay. Having sold more than 170 million records worldwide, they are the most successful group of the 21st century.

== Early life ==
Jonathan Mark Buckland was born on 11 September 1977 in Islington, London, England. He is the second child of John Buckland, a former teacher at Holywell High School, and his wife Joy. The family moved to Pantymwyn, Flintshire, Wales when he was four years old. His primary education was fulfilled at Ysgol y Waun and he learned the basics of guitar there. Other activities involved football, rugby and starring in plays. Buckland also earned the Ron Bishop Trophy while in the Year 5 sports team. Studies continued at Alun School, where he took A-level music lessons. Former teacher Margaret Parr said he has particular talent for composition.

During his youth, the guitarist listened to Jimi Hendrix and Eric Clapton records owned by his parents. He was encouraged to acquire further experience on the guitar by his brother Tim, who shared works from George Harrison, My Bloody Valentine, Ride, Sonic Youth, the Stone Roses and U2 with him. The former's debut album is what motivated Buckland to choose his instrument, though the first chords he learned were from "Kinky Afro" (1990) by Happy Mondays.

He used to have piano lessons when he was seven years old, but did not enjoy them. At 10 years old, the guitarist was part of a rap group and experimented with computer music by using beats consisted of dog barks. Buckland then joined the Scouts when he was 11 years old and mentioned still liking the uniform in 2008. Moreover, the guitarist stated that one night when his friends were playing in a field, they had an encounter with an angry sheep which attacked him multiple times. The experience has led him to avoid wearing wool and eating lamb ever since. In 2019, he recalled taking a holiday job at the Daily Post, adding photos of houses for sale to the pressings. His education was continued at University College London, where he attained a 2:1 degree in mathematics and astronomy and formed Coldplay with Chris Martin, Guy Berryman and Will Champion.

== Career ==
=== Coldplay ===
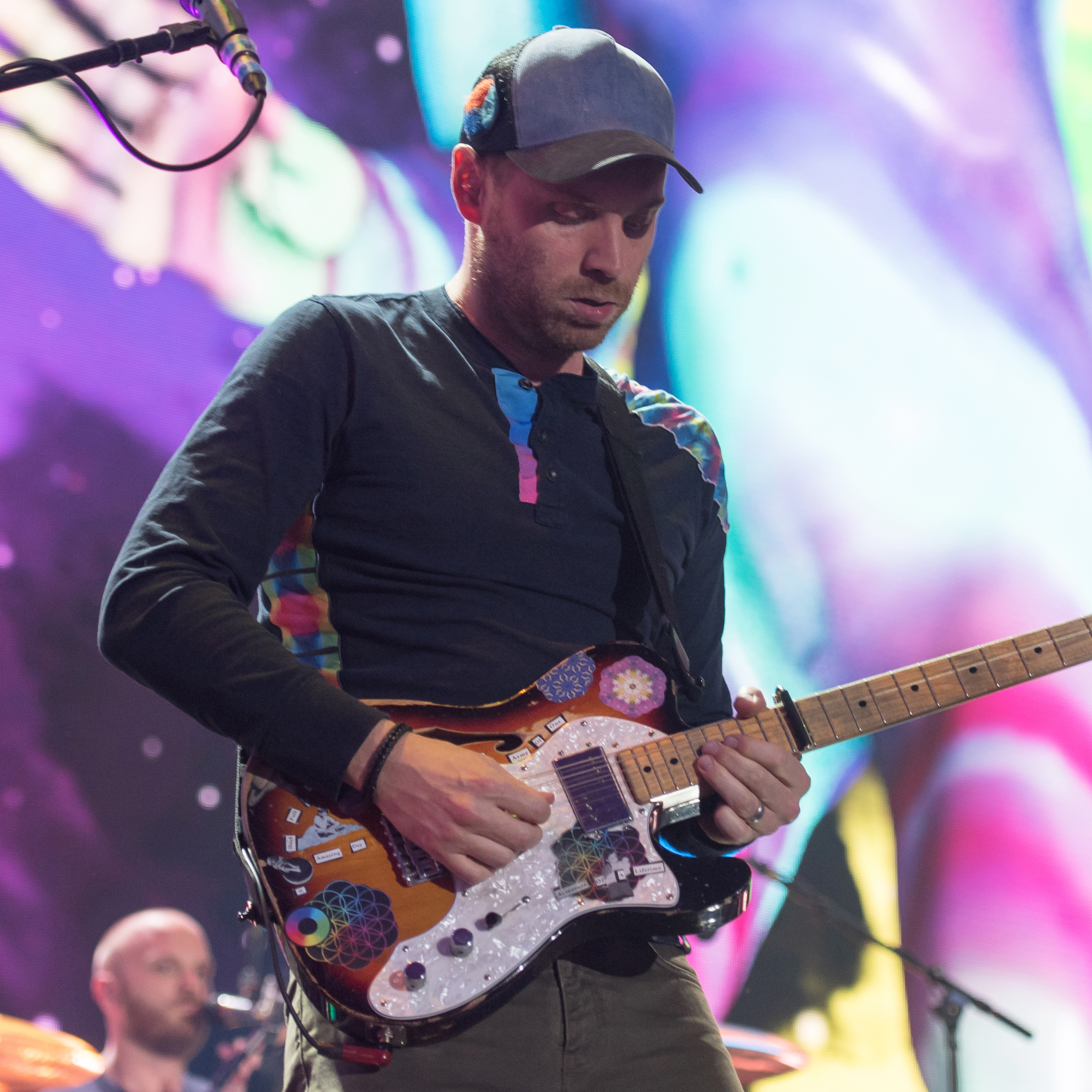
Buckland playing the guitar during Global Citizen Festival in 2017

Buckland co-founded the band along with Martin. They met each other during University College London's orientation week in 1996. Both resided at the university's Ramsay Hall, where Champion mentioned there were "a lot of musicians and a lot of show-offs", but "Jonny was not one of those show-offs", he further added that "the bloke who turned out to be the best guitarist out of all of us was the bloke who had his guitar hidden in his cupboard and who never got it out or was pushy about his guitaring". Martin stated meeting Buckland was "like falling in love". They began to practise and write songs together in early 1997. Berryman had already joined them by November of that year, with the trio being called Big Fat Noises. Champion then completed the performing line-up in 1998. (Note: Overall, the fifth and final member was music manager and creative director Phil Harvey.)

The previous group name was dropped when Champion scheduled their debut live performance at The Laurel Tree only a few days after he became part of the band, with Starfish being chosen "in a panic". In Coldplay, Buckland is usually regarded as quiet, friendly, unassuming and "the wise owl" of the group. During an interview, Martin commented spending his "entire life trying to drag him out of the shadows, because I know that he is a guitar hero—to me anyway". The band used his bedroom for rehearsals in their early years, being near the neighbors who "were able to tolerate the noise". They stated in 2019 that Buckland is usually the first to either disapprove or give his input on Martin's initial song ideas, although he was responsible for starting tracks like "Adventure of a Lifetime" on his own, which was released as the lead single for their seventh album A Head Full of Dreams (2015). Despite not being the group's most prominent backing vocalist, he can be heard in many songs and provided lead vocals in "Don't Panic", the opening track of Parachutes (2000).

=== Other projects ===
Buckland guest starred on Ian McCulloch's third album, Slideling (2003), by playing guitar in the songs "Sliding" and "Arthur". In the following year, he made a cameo appearance on the comedy horror film Shaun of the Dead (2004) along with Martin. They later recorded "Beach Chair" for Jay-Z's ninth album, Kingdom Come (2006), and were featured in Slashed (2010), an independent horror film directed by Ash. He supports food and wine magazine Noble Rot, becoming an investor in its namesake restaurants. Philanthropic activities include being a Kitchen Club trustee. In 2019, the guitarist joined Champion to assist Jodie Whittaker in her cover of "Yellow" for BBC's Children in Need album.

== Musical style ==
=== Equipment ===
Buckland plays a Fender Telecaster Thinline (1972), which is recognised for having fuller sounds compared to other guitars. He is occasionally seen using Jazzmaster, Jaguar and Gibson ES-335 models as well, the latter being integral to A Rush of Blood to the Head (2002). On the Music of the Spheres World Tour (2022–2025), his equipment consisted of 14 guitars and the Telecasters were delivered by Nash, rather than Fender. Buckland has at least two Hot Rod DeVille amplifiers, but reports describing their exact version are inconsistent. His pedals include the Fulltone OCD for boost; the Electro-Harmonix Micro POG, Pro Co RAT (vintage model) and TS9 Ibanez Tube Screamer for distortion; the BOSS RV-3 for reverb; and the BOSS TR-2 for tremolo. He also makes extensive use of the Strymon Timeline, Line 6 DL4 and MXR Phase 90 units.

=== Influences ===
Noted for sparse and delicate arrangements, Buckland affirmed that "I've never gone in much for the solos. I was always more interested in atmospherics. Listening to bands like Mercury Rev, My Bloody Valentine, or even the Verve, the way those guitarists played. There's no Van Halen in me". His use of slide bar have a stylistic chiming and ringing timbre which has led to comparisons to the Edge, who commented during an interview at Glastonbury that "Jonny is an inspiration to guitar players everywhere, I am proud to know that I was one of his main influences. It makes me feel like a real rock star". In 2020, he shared playlists with his favourite tracks and artists from each decade on social media, featuring the Velvet Underground, Joy Division, Kate Bush, Donna Summer and Björk. His favourite Coldplay guitar riff is "Hurts Like Heaven" (2011).

== Personal life ==
According to The Times, Buckland has an estimated wealth of £113 million as of May 2022. He is a Tottenham Hotspur F.C. supporter. After maintaining a vegetarian diet for several years, he resumed eating meat during a trip to Japan, where a communication issue led to him being served beef. This led him to discover that he liked meat-based products, but he still does Meatless Monday. His brother Tim was part of the Domino State, which opened for Coldplay on the Viva la Vida Tour (2008–2010). He married jewellery designer Chloe Lee-Evans in 2009 and has two children with her.

The family reside in London's Belsize Park area, but they also own two apartments in New York City. Buckland purchased the first for $3.4 million, while the second was bought for $5.1 million and made available for rent. He is godfather to Martin's daughter Apple, along with English actor Simon Pegg. He said during an interview for BBC Radio 2 that his favourite activity beyond music is reading books. His great-grandfather formed a band named Vic Buckland's Dance Orchestra between the late 1910s and early 1920s. One of their photographs inspired the album cover and vintage aesthetic that was used on the marketing campaign for Everyday Life (2019).

== Discography ==
=== With Coldplay ===
- Parachutes (2000)
- A Rush of Blood to the Head (2002)
- X&Y (2005)
- Viva la Vida or Death and All His Friends (2008)
- Mylo Xyloto (2011)
- Ghost Stories (2014)
- A Head Full of Dreams (2015)
- Everyday Life (2019)
- Music of the Spheres (2021)
- Moon Music (2024)

=== Solo credits ===
- "Sliding" (2003) – guitarist
- "Arthur" (2003) – guitarist
- "Beach Chair" (2006) – guitarist

== See also ==
- List of people associated with University College London
- List of British Grammy winners and nominees
- List of best-selling music artists
- List of highest-grossing live music artists
- List of artists who reached number one on the UK Singles Chart
