= A Head Full of Dreams Tour =

2016–2017 concert tour by Coldplay

- Tour by Coldplay
- Promotional poster
- Location: Asia; Europe; North America; South America; Oceania
- Associated albums: A Head Full of Dreams; Kaleidoscope EP
- Start date: 31 March 2016
- End date: 15 November 2017
- No. of shows: 122
- Producer: Live Nation
- Attendance: 5.38 million
- Box office: $523 million (Note: $686.94 million in 2025 dollars.)
- Website: coldplay.com/tour

Coldplay concert chronology
- Ghost Stories Tour (2014); A Head Full of Dreams Tour (2016–2017); Music of the Spheres World Tour (2022–2025)

A Head Full of Dreams Tour was the seventh concert tour undertaken by British rock band Coldplay. It was first announced on 27 November 2015 in support of their seventh studio album, A Head Full of Dreams, and marked a return to live performing at stadiums following the intimate shows from Ghost Stories Tour (2014), which saw the band playing in venues such as the Beacon Theatre and Royal Albert Hall. With exception of "Fun" and hidden track "X Marks the Spot", all songs from the album were played. The band combined laser lights and pyrotechnics with raw, acoustic segments between stages, complementing the performances with a new version of the Xylobands developed for the Mylo Xyloto Tour (2011–2012).

The concert run consisted of 122 shows in eight legs across five continents, starting at Argentina's Estadio Ciudad de La Plata on 31 March 2016 and finishing at the same venue on 15 November 2017. It also marked their first solo shows in Latin America since Viva la Vida Tour (2009–2010). Billboard noted that Coldplay earned $523 million from 5.38 million tickets across 114 reported dates, making A Head Full of Dreams Tour the third-highest-grossing tour of all time upon conclusion. In 2018, Live in Buenos Aires was released to celebrate the concert run and promoted along with The Butterfly Package, a set which additionally contained Live in São Paulo and Coldplay: A Head Full of Dreams. The latter is a career-spanning documentary directed by Mat Whitecross.

== Development ==
=== Background ===
Following the release of Coldplay's sixth album, Ghost Stories (2014), the band announced they would not be making a usual tour for it, limiting themselves to one-off concerts at smaller venues around the world. On 6 November 2015, "Adventure of a Lifetime" was made available as the lead single for A Head Full of Dreams. The song was succeeded by the tour announcement on 27 November, which included numerous stadium dates spread across 14 countries in Europe and Latin America for the next year. During an interview for The Late Late Show with James Corden, the band mentioned they would also be visiting Asia and North America. In April 2016, Coldplay announced 12 new arena shows in the United States. Months later, they teased new dates for Singapore, Philippines, Taiwan, South Korea and Japan on social media. In 2017, the tour's namesake album was further promoted with Kaleidoscope EP, a companion piece including four new songs and a live version of "Something Just Like This" recorded at Tokyo Dome.

=== Promotion ===
Before starting the tour, Coldplay performed at the Super Bowl 50 halftime show, which included appearances from Beyoncé, Bruno Mars, Mark Ronson and the Youth Orchestra Los Angeles. They achieved the highest audience in history for a group at the event, drawing 115.5 million viewers. The band later appeared in multiple festivals, including the BBC Radio 1's Big Weekend in Exeter. Lead singer Chris Martin said he lived "the first few years of my life less than 500 yards from where we'll be performing so this couldn't be more of a homecoming for me". In February 2016, they were announced as Glastonbury Festival headliners for the fourth time, becoming the first act to reach the milestone. Months later, the band appeared at Global Citizen Festival in Mumbai and played "Maa Tujhe Salaam" with A. R. Rahman. Martin has curated the event since 2015 and plans to fulfil the role for 15 years. He later invited Colombian singer Shakira to the Hamburg edition. In September 2017, Coldplay took part in the iHeartRadio Music Festival.

== Opening acts ==
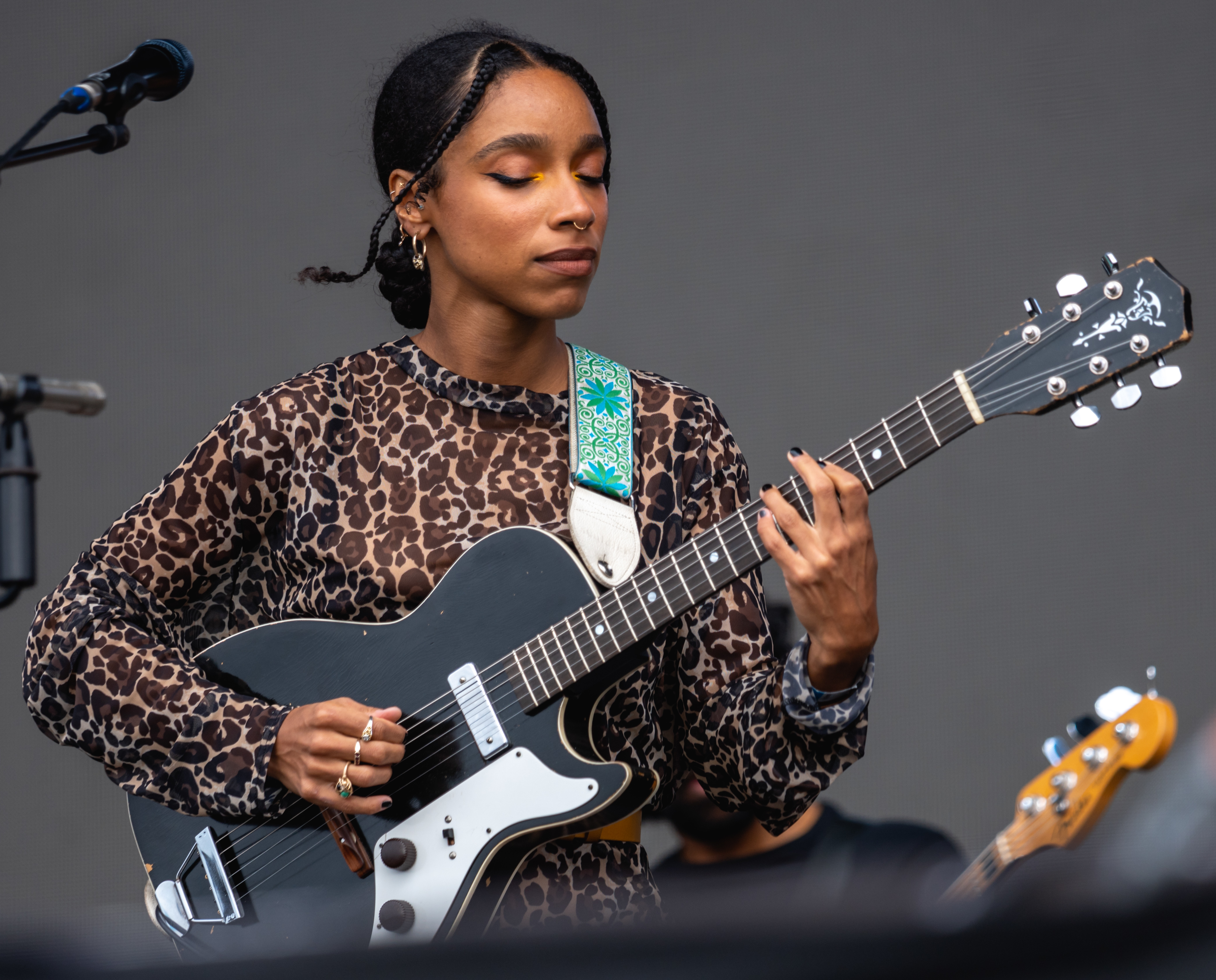
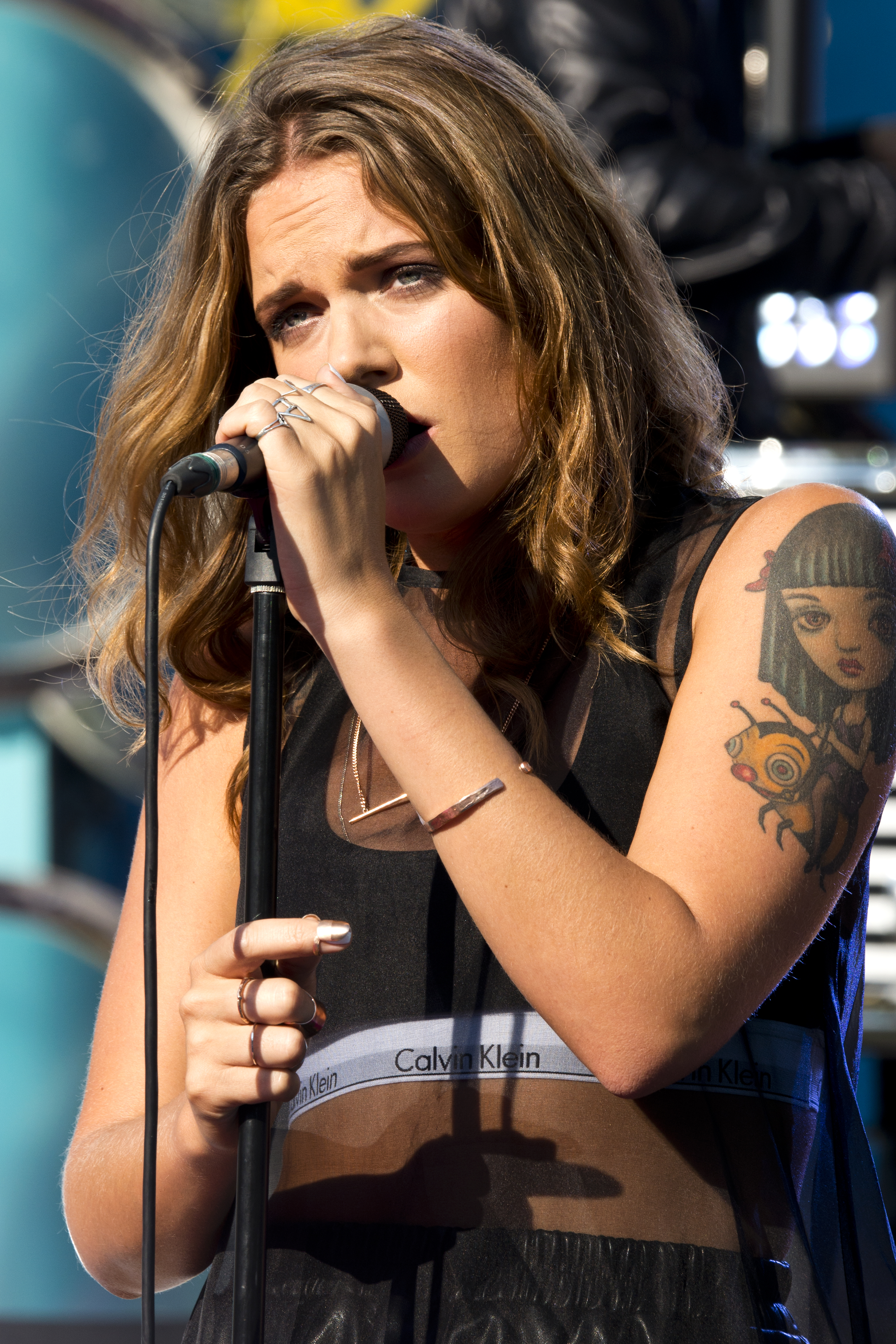
Lianne La Havas (left) and Tove Lo (right) supported the band in Europe and North America, respectively.

Most of the tour included two supporting acts on each concert, with British singer Lianne La Havas opening all performances held during the first Latin American and European legs, marking the first stadium shows of her career. She noted being a fan of Coldplay for many years and grew up listening to them. Canadian singer Alessia Cara supported the first European and North American runs as well, which additionally included Foxes and Birdy. In select dates, local artists from their respective country were invited to serve as opening acts: Ximena Sariñana and Hana Ciliberti performed in the Mexico City shows, while Radwimps played at the Tokyo Dome on 19 April 2017. Remaining dates for the Asian leg were supported by Jess Kent, who also participated in the concerts held in Australia and New Zealand.

For their second run in Europe, Coldplay included AlunaGeorge and Swedish singer Tove Lo, with whom they collaborated on the song "Fun", from A Head Full of Dreams (2015). The local acts invited for Hannover, Gothenburg and Cardiff were German singer Femme Schmidt, Danish group Mew and English band Embrace, respectively. Meanwhile, the second leg in North America featured singers Izzy Bizu and Alina Baraz. In November 2017, Coldplay finished the tour with shows in Brazil and Argentina, which were opened by Jon Hopkins and Dua Lipa. The former has been a collaborator of the band since their fourth album, Viva la Vida or Death and All His Friends (2008), while Martin co-wrote the song "Homesick" for the latter's debut album. After being asked about the experience, she commented it was "amazing" and "surreal to get to sit next to him on the piano and hear him perform so close to me" and thanked the singer for the opportunity, adding she learned a lot from him when they were on studio.

== Concert synopsis ==
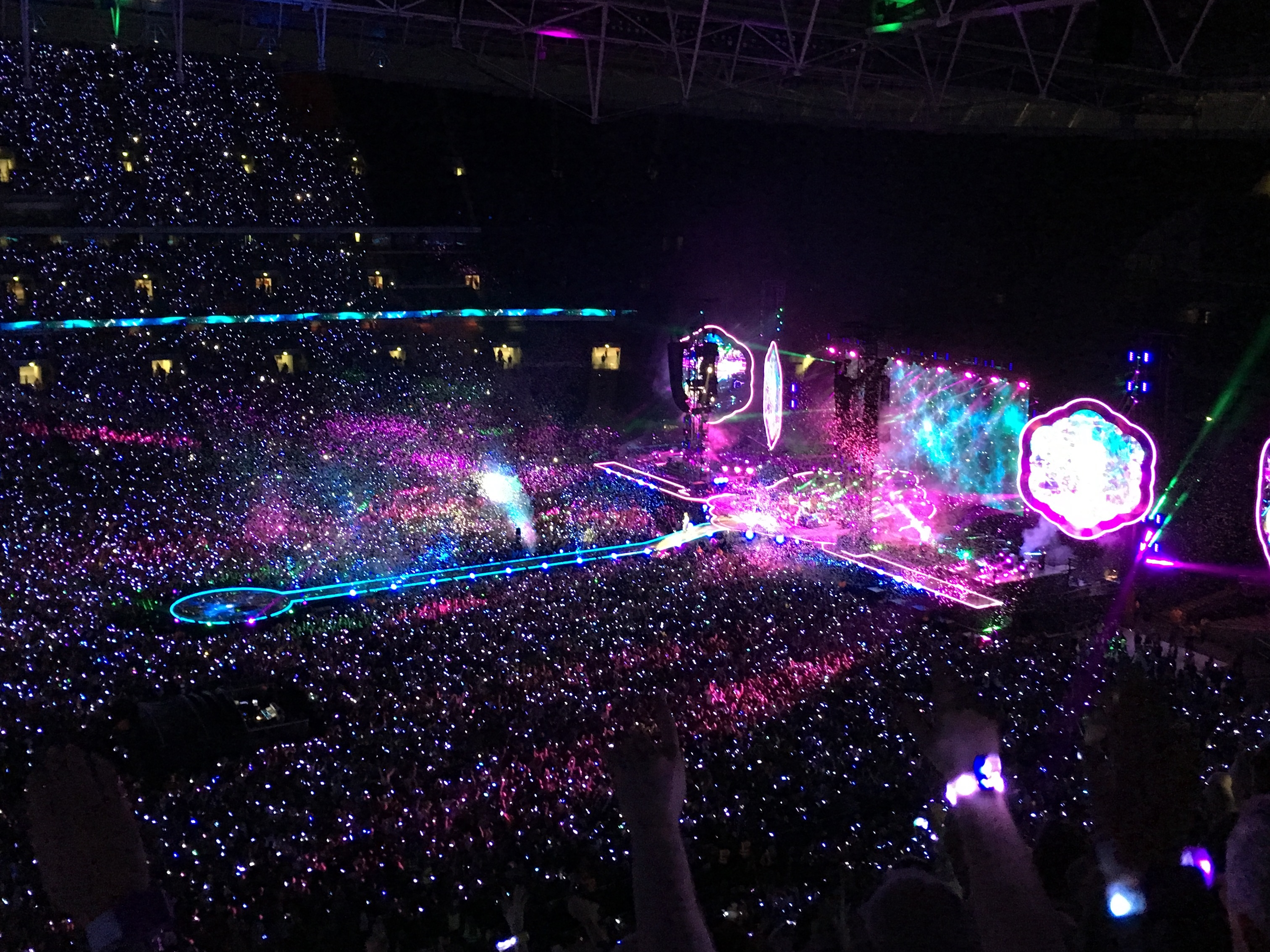
Coldplay at Wembley Stadium in 2016. The band also had an additional small stage where they performed an acoustic set.

Similar to the Mylo Xyloto Tour (2011–2012), the band combined routines that used laser light and pyrotechnic visuals at the main stage with intimate sets at the B-stage and C-stage. During the latter segment, songs were played strictly in acoustic renditions. Shows usually featured between 22 and 25 tracks, which sometimes incorporated new intros and outros: "Paradise" started regularly but ended in its Tiësto remix version, while "Fix You" was performed with an additional instrumental background from "Midnight". Before the tour began, Martin said Coldplay would "finally have a set list where we feel good about it from start to finish". He joked about being "at the point in our career where we can get through a concert without playing anything shit" as well.

Aside from their own catalogue, the band often covered songs from other artists, most notably "Heroes" by David Bowie during the first four legs of the tour. According to Martin, they were good friends with Bowie, though he rejected a collaboration for "Lhuna", a charity single released with Australian singer Kylie Minogue in 2008, claiming the track was "not one of your best". The band also performed Johnny Cash's "Ring of Fire" in selected shows. Coldplay originally wrote "Til Kingdom Come" as a collaboration with the singer, but he died before being able to record it. Additionally, the band had a "Fan Dedication Song" segment at the C-stage: "We'd ask people to give us a reason why they want us to play that song so there is a purpose behind why we play it".

== Commercial performance ==
=== Boxscore ===
Fans who pre-ordered A Head Full of Dreams (2015) on Amazon were given early access to tickets for the United Kingdom shows on 26 November, while general sales for the whole leg happened over the ensuing week. Due to high demand, Coldplay scheduled additional performances in Mexico City, Barcelona, Manchester, Zurich, London, Amsterdam and Copenhagen. Pollstar reported that the concerts at Wembley Stadium (303,985), Stade de France (235,611) and Foro Sol (195,192) achieved the greatest attendance numbers of the group's career at the time. Sales in Abu Dhabi and Singapore were concluded in record time. More than 900,000 people tried to buy tickets in Seoul, which led to multiple website outages. In December 2016, Billboard ranked the band at number three on the list of most successful live entertainers of the year, earning $221.1 million from 2.43 million entries. They achieved the feat once again in December 2017, with $278.1 million from 2.7 million admissions. Following the last shows in Latin America, it was revealed that Coldplay had grossed $523 million and drawn 5.38 million attendees across their 114 reported dates, securing the third-highest-grossing tour of all time.

=== Venue records ===
Key
†	Indicates a former venue record

List of venue records
Year	Dates	Venue	Region	Description	Ref.
2016	3 April	Estadio Nacional de Chile	Chile	Fastest ticket sales ever in Chile (over 50,000 in a day) †	
2016	17 April	Foro Sol	Mexico	Highest single-day attendance (67,451)	
2016	26 June	Worthy Farm	England	Most headline performances at Glastonbury Festival (4 shows) †	
2017	31 March – 1 April	Singapore National Stadium	Singapore	First act to perform two shows on a single tour	
2017	31 March – 1 April	Singapore National Stadium	Singapore	Highest attendance (102,508) †	
2017	31 March – 1 April	Singapore National Stadium	Singapore	Highest gross ($12.5 million) †	
2017	7 April	Rajamangala Stadium	Thailand	Highest single-day attendance (62,068)	
2017	11–12 April	HSR Taoyuan Station Plaza	Taiwan	First act to perform two shows on a single tour	
2017	11–12 April	HSR Taoyuan Station Plaza	Taiwan	Highest attendance (72,212)	
2017	11–12 April	HSR Taoyuan Station Plaza	Taiwan	Most tickets sold for an international tour in Taiwanese history (72,212) †	
2017	15–18 July	Stade de France	France	First group to perform three shows on a single tour	
2017	15–18 July	Stade de France	France	Highest attendance (235,611) †	
2017	1 August (Note: The first two shows were held in 2016.)	MetLife Stadium	United States	First international group to perform three shows on a single tour	
2017	17 August	Soldier Field	United States	Most sold-out performances on a single tour (3 shows) (Note: Tied with U2's 360° Tour (2009–2011) and the Grateful Dead's Fare Thee Well (2015).)	
2017	6 October	Rose Bowl	United States	Most sold-out performances on a single tour (3 shows) (Note: Tied with One Direction's Where We Are Tour (2014).)	
2017	7–8 November	Allianz Parque	Brazil	First act to perform three shows on a single tour	
2017	14–15 November	Estadio Ciudad de La Plata	Argentina	First act to perform four shows on a single tour	

== Critical reception ==
The tour was met with generally positive reviews from music critics, with Ludovic Hunter-Tilney from the Financial Times describing it as a "bubble of positivity making its way around a turbulent world". He stated large venues were a "natural home" for Coldplay and where their "uplifting platitudes make most sense". Writing for The Sydney Morning Herald, Bernard Zuel commented the concert was "very big, but just on the right side of huge. They get loud and in your face but never up your nose. They grab for audience participation but collegially rather than greedily", praising how they created a "continuously satisfying pop show that has elements of U2 and Taylor Swift, Springsteen and Kylie, but somehow retains a sliver of modesty". In a five-star piece for the Evening Standard at Wembley Stadium, David Smyth attested "Coldplay are playing more stadium shows in London than anyone else this summer, because no one else is doing this kind of thing better. Long may they shine". Entertainment Weekly ranked the tour among the best of 2016. The Observer's Kitty Empire rated their Croke Park performance with four stars out of five, mentioning that the band were tireless during an "eye-popping" spectacle.

== Accolades ==
List of awards and nominations
Year	Ceremony	Category	Result	Ref.
2016	Billboard Live Music Awards	Top Draw	Won	
2016	Billboard Live Music Awards	Top Tour	Nominated	
2016	Billboard Live Music Awards	Top Boxscore (Wembley Stadium, 15–19 June 2016)	Won	
2016	Live UK Music Business Awards (Note: The Live UK Music Business Awards was established in 2010 to honour the best British professionals in the live music industry.)	Spectacle of the Year (Glastonbury Festival 2016)	Runner-up	
2016	Live UK Music Business Awards	Best Festival Performance (Glastonbury Festival 2016)	Won	
2016	Los 40 Music Awards	Tour of the Year	Nominated	
2016	Parnelli Awards	Lighting Director of the Year (Graham Feast)	Nominated	
2016	Parnelli Awards	Video Director of the Year (Ben Miles)	Nominated	
2016	Parnelli Awards	Staging Company of the Year (StageCo)	Nominated	
2016	Parnelli Awards	Rigging Company of the Year (Reed Rigging)	Nominated	
2016	Parnelli Awards	Production Manager of the Year (Bill Leabody)	Nominated	
2016	Ticketmaster Awards	Ticket of the Year – Global	Won	
2016	Ticketmaster Awards	Ticket of the Year – United Kingdom	Won	
2016	Ticketmaster Awards	Ticket of the Year – Spain	Won	
2016	Ticketmaster Awards	Most Anticipated Event of 2017 – France	Won	
2017	American Music Awards	Tour of the Year	Won	
2017	The Arthur Awards	The Gaffer (Bill Leabody)	Won	
2017	Billboard Music Awards	Top Rock Tour	Won	
2017	Billboard Live Music Awards	Top Draw	Nominated	
2017	Billboard Live Music Awards	Top Tour	Nominated	
2017	iHeartRadio Music Awards	Best Tour	Won	
2017	NME Awards	Music Moment of the Year (Viola Beach Tribute)	Won	
2017	Pollstar Awards	Major Tour of the Year	Nominated	
2017	Pollstar Awards	Most Creative Stage Production	Nominated	
2017	Ticketmaster Awards	Ticket of the Year – Global	Won	
2017	Ticketmaster Awards	Ticket of the Year – Canada	Won	
2017	Ticketmaster Awards	Ticket of the Year – France	Won	
2017	Ticketmaster Awards	Best Live Event of the Past 20 Years – Ireland	Won	
2017	Ticketmaster Awards	Ticket of the Year – Ireland	Won	
2017	Ticketmaster Awards	Ticket of the Year – Poland	Won	
2017	Ticketmaster Awards	Ticket of the Year – Sweden	Won	
2017	TPi Awards (Note: The TPi Awards was established in 2002 to honour excellence in global live entertainment based on a public-voted selection process.)	Live Production of the Year	Won	
2018	Parnelli Awards	Pyro Company of the Year (Strictly FX)	Won	
2018	Parnelli Awards	Tour Manager of the Year (Marguerite Nguyen)	Nominated	
2018	Pollstar Awards	Major Tour of the Year	Nominated	
2018	Pollstar Awards	Most Creative Stage Production	Nominated	
2018	Pollstar Awards	Tech Enhancement of the Year (Xylobands)	Nominated	
2018	Billboard Music Awards	Top Rock Tour	Nominated	
2021	The Arthur Awards	Tour of the Decade	Nominated	
2021	The Arthur Awards	The Gaffer of the Decade (Bill Leabody)	Nominated	

== Live album ==
After the tour was finished, Coldplay released Live in Buenos Aires (2018), their fifth live album. It consisted of two CDs with songs played during their last show in La Plata. The record was marketed along with The Butterfly Package, a set which additionally contained Live in São Paulo, their first music film to include a concert in full, and Coldplay: A Head Full of Dreams, a documentary featuring previously unseen behind-the-scenes footage. A one-night-only premiere for the latter was held at selected cinemas across the world one month earlier, grossing $3.5 million from over 300,000 tickets sold and reaching number one at the box office of Netherlands; number two in Australia, Italy and United Kingdom; and number five in the United States. Both projects were directed by Mat Whitecross, a long-time collaborator of the band. Sam Sodomsky from Pitchfork wrote that Live in Buenos Aires made "a strong case for the legacy of one of the 21st century's most enduring live acts", while Live in São Paulo was nominated for a UK Music Video Award.

== Set list ==
This set list was taken from the 15 November 2017 concert in La Plata, Argentina. It does not represent all shows throughout the tour.

Main stage

1. "A Head Full of Dreams" (with Charlie Chaplin's speech from The Great Dictator)
2. "Yellow"
3. "Every Teardrop Is a Waterfall"
4. "The Scientist"
5. "God Put a Smile Upon Your Face" (with elements of "Oceans")
6. "Paradise" (with elements of the song's Tiësto remix)

B-stage

7. "Always in My Head"
8. "Magic"
9. "Everglow"

Main stage

10. "Clocks" (with elements of "Army of One")
11. "Midnight" (interlude)
12. "Charlie Brown"
13. "Hymn for the Weekend"
14. "Fix You" (with elements of "Midnight")
15. "Viva la Vida"
16. "Adventure of a Lifetime"
17. "De Música Ligera" (Soda Stereo cover)

C-stage

18. "Kaleidoscope" (interlude)
19. "In My Place"
20. "Amor Argentina"

Main stage

21. "Something Just Like This"
22. "A Sky Full of Stars"
23. "Up&Up"

=== Details ===
- "God Put a Smile upon Your Face" was replaced by "Birds" on select dates.
- "Heroes", "Ring of Fire" and "Johnny B. Goode" were separately covered on select dates.
- "In My Place" featured Will Champion's main vocals on select dates.
- "Something Just Like This" was added to the set list starting from Singapore.
- "Life Is Beautiful" was added to the setlist starting from San Diego.

=== Highlights ===
The band performed covers, received guests and improvised songs specifically for the occasion on numerous dates, skipping to the rest of the show otherwise.

Covers

- Exeter, 2016 – "Raspberry Beret".
- Pilton, 2016 – "Boys That Sing".
- Copenhagen, 2016 – "Sometimes It Snows in April".
- East Rutherford, 2016 – "Jersey Girl".
- Columbus, 2016 – "Have I Told You Lately".
- Foxborough, 2016 – "Ride On".
- Philadelphia, 2016 – "Streets of Philadelphia".
- Paradise, 2016 – "Mr. Brightside".
- Santa Clara, 2016 – "Life on Mars".
- London, 2016 – "Suzanne".
- Abu Dhabi, 2016 – "Faith".
- Taoyuan, 2017 – "Happy Birthday to You".
- Brussels, 2017 – "Formidable".
- Gothenburg, 2017 – "Känn Ingen Sorg för Mig Göteborg".
- East Rutherford, 2017 – "Crawling".
- Miami Gardens, 2017 – "Happy Birthday to You".
- La Plata, 2017 – "De Música Ligera".

Guests

- Pilton, 2016 – Michael Eavis and Barry Gibb.
- East Rutherford, 2016 – Michael J. Fox.
- Pasadena, 2016 – James Corden.
- Mumbai, 2016 – A. R. Rahman.
- Auckland, 2016 – Neil Finn.
- Melbourne, 2016 – Emmanuel Kelly.
- Milan, 2017 – Davide Rossi.
- Hamburg, 2017 – Shakira.
- Cardiff, 2017 – Rob Brydon.
- Portland, 2017 – Peter Buck.

Improvisations

- Sydney, 2016 – "Christmas with the Kangaroos".
- Abu Dhabi, 2016 – "2016 Song".
- Singapore, 2017 – "Singapore Song".
- Bay City, 2017 – "Manila Song".
- Taoyuan, 2017 – "Taiwan Song".
- Seoul, 2017 – "South Korea Song" and "City of Seoul".
- Décines-Charpieu, 2017 – "Lyon Song".
- Gothenburg, 2017 – "Gothenburg Song".
- Frankfurt, 2017 – "Frankfurt Song".
- Dublin, 2017 – "Dublin Song".
- Cardiff, 2017 – "Wales Song".
- Saint-Denis, 2017 – "Paris Song".
- Omaha, 2017 – "Monday Night in Omaha".
- Toronto, 2017 – "Toronto Song".
- Miami Gardens, 2017 – "Houston #1".
- Porto Alegre, 2017 – "Gaúchos".
- São Paulo, 2017 – "Paulistanos".
- La Plata, 2017 – "Amor Argentina".

== Tour dates ==
List of 2016 concerts
Date (2016)	City	Country	Venue	Opening acts	Attendance	Revenue
31 March	La Plata	Argentina	Estadio Ciudad de La Plata	Lianne La Havas; Hana	97,069 / 97,069	$6,619,890
1 April	La Plata	Argentina	Estadio Ciudad de La Plata	Lianne La Havas; Hana	97,069 / 97,069	$6,619,890
3 April	Santiago	Chile	Estadio Nacional de Chile	Lianne La Havas; María Colores	60,787 / 60,787	$4,539,380
5 April	Lima	Peru	Estadio Nacional del Perú	Lianne La Havas; Gala Brie	43,720 / 43,720	$4,828,810
7 April	São Paulo	Brazil	Allianz Parque	Lianne La Havas; Tiê	46,563 / 46,563	$4,093,280
10 April	Rio de Janeiro	Brazil	Estádio do Maracanã	Lianne La Havas; Tiê	59,669 / 59,669	$4,645,550
13 April	Bogotá	Colombia	Estadio El Campín	Lianne La Havas; Elsa y Elmar	41,376 / 41,376	$4,792,820
15 April	Mexico City	Mexico	Foro Sol	Lianne La Havas; Ximena Sariñana	195,192 / 195,192	$11,231,300
16 April	Mexico City	Mexico	Foro Sol	Lianne La Havas; Ximena Sariñana	195,192 / 195,192	$11,231,300
17 April	Mexico City	Mexico	Foro Sol	Lianne La Havas; Ximena Sariñana	195,192 / 195,192	$11,231,300
24 May	Nice	France	Stade Charles-Ehrmann	Lianne La Havas; Alessia Cara	53,566 / 53,566	$3,367,270
26 May	Barcelona	Spain	Estadi Olímpic Lluís Companys	Lianne La Havas; Alessia Cara	111,261 / 111,261	$9,734,130
27 May	Barcelona	Spain	Estadi Olímpic Lluís Companys	Lianne La Havas; Alessia Cara	111,261 / 111,261	$9,734,130
29 May (Note: The concert in Exeter on 29 May 2016 was part of BBC Radio 1's Big Weekend.)	Exeter	England	Powderham Castle	—N/a	—N/a	—N/a
1 June	Gelsenkirchen	Germany	Veltins-Arena	Lianne La Havas; Alessia Cara	55,048 / 55,048	$4,650,320
4 June	Manchester	England	Etihad Stadium	Lianne La Havas; Alessia Cara	109,492 / 109,492	$10,676,300
5 June	Manchester	England	Etihad Stadium	Lianne La Havas; Alessia Cara	109,492 / 109,492	$10,676,300
7 June	Glasgow	Scotland	Hampden Park	Lianne La Havas; Alessia Cara	48,526 / 48,526	$4,547,280
11 June	Zürich	Switzerland	Letzigrund	Foxes; Lea Lu	89,254 / 89,254	$11,808,300
12 June	Zürich	Switzerland	Letzigrund	Lianne La Havas; Alessia Cara	89,254 / 89,254	$11,808,300
15 June	London	England	Wembley Stadium	Lianne La Havas; Alessia Cara	303,985 / 303,985	$28,810,200
16 June	London	England	Wembley Stadium	Lianne La Havas; Alessia Cara	303,985 / 303,985	$28,810,200
18 June	London	England	Wembley Stadium	Lianne La Havas; Reef	303,985 / 303,985	$28,810,200
19 June	London	England	Wembley Stadium	Lianne La Havas; Reef	303,985 / 303,985	$28,810,200
23 June	Amsterdam	Netherlands	Amsterdam Arena	Lianne La Havas; Alessia Cara	104,511 / 104,511	$8,759,000
24 June	Amsterdam	Netherlands	Amsterdam Arena	Lianne La Havas; Alessia Cara	104,511 / 104,511	$8,759,000
26 June (Note: The concert in Pilton on 26 June 2016 was part of the Glastonbury Festival.)	Pilton	England	Worthy Farm	—N/a	—N/a	—N/a
28 June (Note: The concert in London on 28 June 2016 was a charity performance for Sentebale.)	London	England	Kensington Palace	—N/a	—N/a	—N/a
29 June	Berlin	Germany	Olympiastadion	Lianne La Havas; Alessia Cara	68,047 / 68,047	$5,540,960
1 July	Hamburg	Germany	Volksparkstadion	Lianne La Havas; Alessia Cara	43,860 / 43,860	$3,808,980
3 July	Stockholm	Sweden	Friends Arena	Birdy; Alessia Cara	53,575 / 53,575	$3,970,140
5 July	Copenhagen	Denmark	Telia Parken	Lianne La Havas; Alessia Cara	96,511 / 96,511	$9,182,590
6 July	Copenhagen	Denmark	Telia Parken	Lianne La Havas; Alessia Cara	96,511 / 96,511	$9,182,590
16 July	East Rutherford (Note: Labelled as New York City in promotional material.)	United States	MetLife Stadium	Alessia Cara; Foxes	100,763 / 100,763	$10,749,394
17 July	East Rutherford	United States	MetLife Stadium	Alessia Cara; Foxes	100,763 / 100,763	$10,749,394
20 July	Indianapolis	United States	Bankers Life Fieldhouse	Alessia Cara; Foxes	12,667 / 12,667	$1,460,006
21 July	St. Louis	United States	Scottrade Center	Alessia Cara; Foxes	13,960 / 13,960	$1,547,633
23 July (Note: The concert in Chicago on 23 July 2016 was cut short due to weather conditions.)	Chicago	United States	Soldier Field	—N/a (Note: The concert in Chicago on 23 July 2016 saw Alessia Cara and Foxes cancelling their sets due to weather conditions.)	95,323 / 95,323	$10,215,572
24 July	Chicago	United States	Soldier Field	Alessia Cara; Foxes	95,323 / 95,323	$10,215,572
27 July	Louisville	United States	KFC Yum! Center	Alessia Cara; Foxes	13,755 / 13,755	$1,520,726
28 July	Columbus	United States	Nationwide Arena	Alessia Cara; Foxes	15,530 / 15,530	$1,933,346
30 July	Foxborough (Note: Labelled as Boston in promotional material.)	United States	Gillette Stadium	Alessia Cara; Foxes	54,952 / 54,952	$6,530,260
1 August	Buffalo	United States	First Niagara Center	Alessia Cara; Foxes	15,100 / 15,100	$1,878,324
3 August	Auburn Hills (Note: Labelled as Detroit in promotional material.)	United States	The Palace of Auburn Hills	Alessia Cara; Foxes	15,436 / 15,436	$1,731,667
4 August	Pittsburgh	United States	Consol Energy Center	Alessia Cara; Foxes	14,360 / 14,360	$1,614,917
6 August	Philadelphia	United States	Lincoln Financial Field	Alessia Cara; Foxes	54,497 / 54,497	$5,530,866
20 August (Note: The concert in Pasadena on 20 August 2016 was broadcast on the internet by Globe Telecom in China and the Philippines.)	Pasadena (Note: Labelled as Los Angeles in promotional material.)	United States	Rose Bowl	Alessia Cara; Bishop Briggs; Stargate	120,062 / 120,062	$10,914,898
21 August	Pasadena	United States	Rose Bowl	Alessia Cara; Bishop Briggs	120,062 / 120,062	$10,914,898
23 August	Glendale (Note: Labelled as Phoenix in promotional material.)	United States	Gila River Arena	Alessia Cara; Bishop Briggs	14,427 / 14,427	$1,776,867
25 August	Tulsa	United States	BOK Center	Alessia Cara; Bishop Briggs	13,234 / 13,234	$1,578,961
27 August	Arlington (Note: Labelled as Dallas in promotional material.)	United States	AT&T Stadium	Alessia Cara; Bishop Briggs	52,538 / 52,538	$5,679,031
29 August	Denver	United States	Pepsi Center	Alessia Cara; Bishop Briggs	15,664 / 15,664	$1,902,639
31 August	Salt Lake City	United States	Vivint Smart Home Arena	Alessia Cara; Bishop Briggs	15,645 / 15,645	$1,871,968
1 September	Paradise (Note: Labelled as Las Vegas in promotional material.)	United States	T-Mobile Arena	Alessia Cara; Bishop Briggs	15,898 / 15,898	$2,124,032
3 September	Santa Clara (Note: Labelled as San Francisco in promotional material.)	United States	Levi's Stadium	Alessia Cara; Bishop Briggs	52,404 / 52,404	$5,990,660
4 September (Note: The concert in Philadelphia on 4 September 2016 was part of the Made in America Festival.)	Philadelphia	United States	Benjamin Franklin Parkway	—N/a	—N/a	—N/a
11 November (Note: The concert in London on 11 November 2016 was a private performance for Absolute Radio.)	London	England	London Palladium	—N/a	—N/a	—N/a
19 November (Note: The concert in Mumbai on 19 November 2016 was part of the Global Citizen Festival.)	Mumbai	India	MMRDA Grounds	—N/a	—N/a	—N/a
3 December	Auckland	New Zealand	Mount Smart Stadium	Lianne La Havas; Jess Kent	39,644 / 39,644	$3,752,610
6 December	Brisbane	Australia	Suncorp Stadium	Lianne La Havas; Jess Kent	49,604 / 49,604	$4,723,300
9 December	Melbourne	Australia	Etihad Stadium	Lianne La Havas; Jess Kent	103,482 / 103,482	$8,920,530
10 December	Melbourne	Australia	Etihad Stadium	Lianne La Havas; Jess Kent	103,482 / 103,482	$8,920,530
13 December	Sydney	Australia	Allianz Stadium	Lianne La Havas; Jess Kent	97,356 / 97,356	$8,813,130
14 December	Sydney	Australia	Allianz Stadium	Lianne La Havas; Jess Kent	97,356 / 97,356	$8,813,130
31 December	Abu Dhabi	United Arab Emirates	Du Arena	DJ Saif	31,285 / 31,285	$4,301,291

List of 2017 concerts
Date (2017)	City	Country	Venue	Opening acts	Attendance	Revenue
31 March	Singapore		Singapore National Stadium	Jess Kent	102,508 / 102,508	$12,517,500
1 April	Singapore		Singapore National Stadium	Jess Kent	102,508 / 102,508	$12,517,500
4 April	Bay City (Note: Labelled as Manila in promotional material.)	Philippines	SM Mall of Asia Concert Grounds	Jess Kent	34,813 / 34,813	$7,189,520
7 April	Bangkok	Thailand	Rajamangala Stadium	Jess Kent	62,068 / 62,068	$8,133,360
11 April	Taoyuan	Taiwan	HSR Taoyuan Station Plaza	Jess Kent	72,212 / 72,212	$11,821,800
12 April	Taoyuan	Taiwan	HSR Taoyuan Station Plaza	Jess Kent	72,212 / 72,212	$11,821,800
15 April	Seoul	South Korea	Seoul Olympic Stadium	Jess Kent	99,837 / 99,837	$10,132,000
16 April	Seoul	South Korea	Seoul Olympic Stadium	Jess Kent	99,837 / 99,837	$10,132,000
19 April	Tokyo	Japan	Tokyo Dome	Radwimps	42,817 / 42,817	$6,513,740
6 June	Munich	Germany	Olympiastadion	AlunaGeorge; Femme Schmidt	62,548 / 62,548	$6,044,640
8 June	Décines-Charpieu (Note: Labelled as Lyon in promotional material.)	France	Parc Olympique Lyonnais	AlunaGeorge; Lyves	50,901 / 50,901	$4,051,740
11 June	Vienna	Austria	Ernst-Happel-Stadion	Tove Lo; Lyves	56,246 / 56,246	$5,597,950
14 June	Leipzig	Germany	Red Bull Arena	Tove Lo; Femme Schmidt	47,233 / 47,233	$4,471,280
16 June	Hanover	Germany	HDI-Arena	AlunaGeorge; Femme Schmidt	46,223 / 46,223	$4,670,110
18 June	Warsaw	Poland	PGE Narodowy	Tove Lo; Lyves	57,615 / 57,615	$3,827,680
21 June	Brussels	Belgium	King Baudouin Stadium	AlunaGeorge; Lyves	100,489 / 100,489	$8,686,710
22 June	Brussels	Belgium	King Baudouin Stadium	AlunaGeorge; Lyves	100,489 / 100,489	$8,686,710
25 June	Gothenburg	Sweden	Ullevi	Mew; Lyves	128,981 / 128,981	$9,399,310
26 June	Gothenburg	Sweden	Ullevi	Mew; Lyves	128,981 / 128,981	$9,399,310
30 June	Frankfurt	Germany	Commerzbank-Arena	Tove Lo; Femme Schmidt	87,833 / 87,833	$9,018,910
1 July	Frankfurt	Germany	Commerzbank-Arena	Tove Lo; Femme Schmidt	87,833 / 87,833	$9,018,910
3 July	Milan	Italy	San Siro	Tove Lo; Lyves	117,307 / 117,307	$8,613,840
4 July	Milan	Italy	San Siro	Tove Lo; Lyves	117,307 / 117,307	$8,613,840
6 July (Note: The concert in Hamburg on 6 July 2017 was part of the Global Citizen Festival.)	Hamburg	Germany	Barclaycard Arena	—N/a	—N/a	—N/a
8 July	Dublin	Ireland	Croke Park	AlunaGeorge; Lyves	80,398 / 80,398	$8,970,100
11 July	Cardiff	Wales	Principality Stadium	Embrace; Lyves	122,851 / 122,851	$11,685,000
12 July	Cardiff	Wales	Principality Stadium	Embrace; Lyves	122,851 / 122,851	$11,685,000
15 July	Saint-Denis (Note: Labelled as Paris in promotional material.)	France	Stade de France	Tove Lo; Lyves	235,611 / 235,611	$19,884,200
16 July	Saint-Denis	France	Stade de France	Tove Lo; Lyves	235,611 / 235,611	$19,884,200
18 July	Saint-Denis	France	Stade de France	Tove Lo; Lyves	235,611 / 235,611	$19,884,200
1 August	East Rutherford	United States	MetLife Stadium	AlunaGeorge; Izzy Bizu	54,501 / 54,501	$7,861,460
4 August	Foxborough	United States	Gillette Stadium	AlunaGeorge; Izzy Bizu	52,188 / 52,188	$6,263,906
6 August	Landover (Note: Labelled as Washington, D.C. in promotional material.)	United States	FedExField	AlunaGeorge; Izzy Bizu	48,380 / 48,380	$4,823,333
8 August	Montreal	Canada	Bell Centre	AlunaGeorge; Izzy Bizu	35,731 / 35,731	$3,967,516
9 August	Montreal	Canada	Bell Centre	AlunaGeorge; Izzy Bizu	35,731 / 35,731	$3,967,516
12 August	Minneapolis	United States	U.S. Bank Stadium	AlunaGeorge; Izzy Bizu	47,472 / 47,472	$4,325,230
14 August	Omaha	United States	CenturyLink Center Omaha	AlunaGeorge; Izzy Bizu	13,009 / 13,009	$1,434,880
15 August	Kansas City	United States	Sprint Center	AlunaGeorge; Izzy Bizu	12,971 / 12,971	$1,736,224
17 August (Note: The concert in Chicago on 17 August 2017 was broadcast on the internet by Samsung Gear VR.)	Chicago	United States	Soldier Field	AlunaGeorge; Izzy Bizu	52,726 / 52,726	$6,026,402
19 August	Cleveland	United States	Quicken Loans Arena	AlunaGeorge; Izzy Bizu	15,963 / 15,963	$2,302,868
21 August	Toronto	Canada	Rogers Centre	AlunaGeorge; Izzy Bizu	94,857 / 94,857	$8,655,294
22 August	Toronto	Canada	Rogers Centre	AlunaGeorge; Izzy Bizu	94,857 / 94,857	$8,655,294
28 August	Miami Gardens (Note: Labelled as Miami in promotional material.)	United States	Hard Rock Stadium	AlunaGeorge; Izzy Bizu	47,866 / 47,866	$6,446,966
22 September (Note: The concert in Paradise on 2 September 2017 was part of the iHeartRadio Music Festival.)	Paradise	United States	T-Mobile Arena	—N/a	—N/a	—N/a
23 September	Seattle	United States	CenturyLink Field	Tove Lo; Alina Baraz	49,031 / 49,031	$5,181,106
26 September	Edmonton	Canada	Rogers Place	Tove Lo; Alina Baraz	27,940 / 27,940	$3,003,657
27 September	Edmonton	Canada	Rogers Place	Tove Lo; Alina Baraz	27,940 / 27,940	$3,003,657
29 September	Vancouver	Canada	BC Place	Tove Lo; Alina Baraz	43,896 / 43,896	$5,015,505
2 October	Portland	United States	Moda Center	Tove Lo; Alina Baraz	14,965 / 14,965	$2,121,648
4 October	Santa Clara	United States	Levi's Stadium	Tove Lo; Alina Baraz	48,341 / 48,341	$5,265,835
6 October	Pasadena	United States	Rose Bowl	Tove Lo; Alina Baraz	64,442 / 64,442	$6,051,529 (Note: The concert in Pasadena on 6 October 2017 had its proceeds donated to the relief efforts of the Puebla earthquake.)
8 October (Note: The concert in San Diego on 8 October 2017 was partially broadcast for Estamos Unidos Mexicanos, which raised funds for the relief efforts of the Puebla earthquake.)	San Diego	United States	SDCCU Stadium	Tove Lo; Alina Baraz	54,279 / 54,279	$5,955,986 (Note: The concert in San Diego on 8 October 2017 had its proceeds donated to the relief efforts of the Puebla earthquake.)
7 November	São Paulo	Brazil	Allianz Parque	Iza; Jon Hopkins	96,549 / 96,549	$10,456,435
8 November	São Paulo	Brazil	Allianz Parque	Dua Lipa; Jon Hopkins	96,549 / 96,549	$10,456,435
11 November	Porto Alegre	Brazil	Arena do Grêmio	Dua Lipa; Jon Hopkins; Tati Portella	50,229 / 50,229	$5,910,139
14 November	La Plata	Argentina	Estadio Ciudad de La Plata	Dua Lipa; Jon Hopkins; Oriana Sabatini	98,197 / 98,197	$7,589,239
15 November	La Plata	Argentina	Estadio Ciudad de La Plata	Dua Lipa; Jon Hopkins; Oriana Sabatini	98,197 / 98,197	$7,589,239
Total					5,389,586 / 5,389,586 (100%)	$523,033,675

== Cancelled shows ==
List of cancelled concerts
Date (2017)	City	Country	Venue	Reason	Ref.
25 August	Houston	United States	NRG Stadium	Hurricane Harvey	

== Personnel ==
Credits adapted from the band's official tour book, which was sold exclusively on merchandise booths and their online store.

Performing members

- Chris Martin – lead vocals, piano, keyboards, rhythm guitar
- Jonny Buckland – lead guitar, backing vocals, keyboards
- Guy Berryman – bass, backing vocals, keyboards, percussion
- Will Champion – drums, backing vocals, percussion

Main crew

- Dave Holmes – manager
- Phil Harvey – creative director
- Arlene Moon – management
- Mandi Frost – management
- Marguerite Nguyen – tour manager
- Bill Leabody – tour production manager
- Craig Finley – stage production manager
- Nicole Erin Massey – production coordinator
- Misty Buckley – production designer
- Paul Normandale – production designer
- Andy Frost – road manager and head of security
- Kim-Maree Penn – security
- Jessie Collins – band assistant
- Ej Randall – band assistant
- Dan Green – audio director
- Rik Simpson – broadcast engineer
- Matt Miller – Pro Tools director
- Tiffany Henry – dressing rooms and wardrobe
- Megumi Kusano – Dave Holmes assistant
- Roxy Pope – management assistant
- Tiffany Hudson – band tour assistant
- Dan Portanier – trainer
- Carys Moggridge – physiotherapist
- Jeff Mauss – tour accountant
- Dick Massey – utilities
- David White – venue security

Backline

- Matt McGinn – guitar tech
- Craig Hope – guitar tech
- Sean Buttery – drum tech
- Paul Newman – bass tech
- Andy Henderson – keyboards tech and digital tech
- Bill Rahko – Pro Tools tech
- Leonel Neto da Rocha – piano tech

Audio

- Chris Wood – monitor engineer
- Tony Smith – FoH tech
- Nick Davis – monitor tech
- Ali Viles – RF tech
- Nick Mooney – audio crew chief

Audio crew

- Jack Murphy
- Brett Taylor
- Alex Fedrizzi
- Tyler Clapp
- Damian Burns
- Peter Smith
- Adam Banister

Lighting

- Graham Feast – lighting director
- Mick Stowe – lighting crew chief

Lighting crew

- Phil Sharp
- Rick Butler
- Gareth Horridge
- Paul Burke
- Adam Morrison
- Colleen Wittenberg
- Kenny Rutkowski
- Tony Quinn
- Pip Schulte
- Matt Helmick

Video

- Ben Miles – video director
- Phil Johnston – video crew chief
- Oli Derynck – video engineer
- Leo Flint – video programmer

Video crew

- Pieter Laleman
- Saria Ofogba
- Chris Farrants
- Ed Prescott
- Graham Lambkin
- Marcus Wareham
- Jeroen Mahieu
- Mark Cruikshank
- Niall Ogilvy
- Michael Cordier
- Hamanshu Patel

Video content produced by

- Ben Miles
- NorthHouse Films
- Shop
- Hello Charlie
- Marcus Haney
- Mat Whitecross

Special effects

- David Kennedy – laser and pyro designer
- Reid Nofsinger – pyro designer and lead SFX

Special effects crew

- Scott Allen
- Alan Grant
- Brook Blomquist
- Jeremy Fox
- Justin Seedle
- Mike Hartle
- Joey Atkinson
- Jeff Jowdy

Rigging crew

- Russel Glen (head rigger)
- Bjorn Melchert
- Matt Rynes
- Jerry Ritter

Carpenter crew

- Jack Deitering (head carpenter)
- Pat Boyd
- Shawn Saucier
- Dale Bryant
- Andrew Pearson
- Lennie Watson
- Jeroen Padberg
- Ryan Floyd

Wristbands

- Jason Regler – tech
- Antony Burry – tech
- Arman Chaparyan – coordinator

Set design assistants

- Richard Olivieri
- Laura Woodroffe

Site coordinators

- Toby Fleming
- Bart Durbin

Lead electrician

- Paul Traynor

Barricade

- Paul Lincoln
- Chris Kordek

Drapes

- Steve Capaldi
- Daniel Roquero Lopez
- Tom Drury

Catering crew

- Susan Power (chief)
- James Morries
- Brendan McKenzie
- Daniel Gamble
- Hannah West
- Sarah Money
- Lulu Foster-Young
- Cherry Pashby
- Alicia Boardman
- Alison Higgins
- Pauline Austin
- Sally Cureton
- Molly Gallagher

Bus drivers

- Sven Schendel
- Jan Sven Berse
- Joachim Wolfram
- Matthias Gerstmann
- Scott Pickering
- Helli Windisch
- Uwe Scholz
- Chris Templar
- Paul Kakasiouris

Truck drivers

- David Ballantyne (chief)
- Mark Coleman (chief)
- Roger Bungay
- Andrew Mellor
- Robbie Jones
- Mel Bentley
- Tristen Bond
- Grant Sharkey
- Jimmy Greives
- Leon Creswick
- Mike Osbourne
- Paul Chapman
- John Stanmore
- Ian Greenwood
- Jason Smith
- Mark Schubert
- Mike Williams
- Steve Dunne
- Jon Baldwin
- Dave Hayhurst
- Albert Golon
- Dougie Miller
- Mark Cameron

Tour book

- Pilar Zeta – artwork and tour book design
- Chris Salmon – digital director and tour book interviews
- Debs Wild – web ambassador

Management

- Marty Diamond – North America booking agent
- Larry Webman – North America booking agent
- Steve Strange – ROW booking agent
- Josh Javor – ROW booking agent
- Gavin Maude – legal
- Ryan Vince – legal
- Lester Dales – business management
- Paul Makin – business management
- David Weise – US business management

Photography by

- Matt Benton
- Marcus Haney
- Phil Harvey
- Pilar Zeta
- Ollie Smallwood
- Ultramajic
- Chris Salmon
- Marguerite Nguyen
- Julia Kennedy
- Matt Miller
- Mariana Miranda Pedroza da Silva
- Irwing Heinz

Others

- Ken Macalpine – merchandise
- Anna Roguski – Oxfam representative
- Phoebe Baldwin – Global Citizen representative
- Hannah Riley – Innocence Project representative

== See also ==
- List of Coldplay live performances
- List of highest-grossing live music artists
- List of most-attended concert tours
- List of most-attended concert series at a single venue

== Notes ==
Cities

Others
