= The Zangwills =

English rock band

The Zangwills in May, 2026 Left to right: Dowling, Vickers, Spence, Davies

The Zangwills are an indie rock band based in Cheshire, United Kingdom. Consisting of vocalist/rhythm guitarist Jake Vickers, lead guitarist Sam Davies, bassist Ed Dowling and drummer Adam Spence, they formed in 2017.

== Background ==
Vickers, Dowling and Davies formed The Zangwills in 2017 whilst attending Sir John Deane's College in Northwich, and were joined shortly after by Spence, a highschool friend of Vickers, completing the lineup. Vickers stated in 2018 that the band's name was inspired by Zangwill Road, a street in Greenwich, London. They recorded their first demos at the college, and played their first gig on June 3rd, 2017 at a small festival near Chester.

The Zangwills performing at their first concert on June 3rd, 2017.

Their first single, New Heights, was released later that year on December 15th. The band’s debut EP, It’s Really up to You, was released on September 3rd, 2018, supported by singles The Horrors of Sobriety and Patio Paradise, the latter gaining media praise. They made their first festival appearances the following year, performing at Liverpool Sound City and Wychwood Festival. Their 2nd EP, In Amongst the Glitter, was released in September 2019, with the lead single Judas on the Dancefloor. The song explores themes of sexual harrasment and spiking at live concerts, and featured a music video produced by actor Maisie Williams and directed by BAFTA winning Lowri Roberts, recorded at MOTH Club, London. The video went on to win the award for Best International Music Video at Focus Wales Film Festival (2022).

The band has released numerous singles following the 2020 Covid pandemic, exploring different genres and instrumentation. They toured the United Kingdom in 2024, and have played several concerts and festivals at venues such as Manchester Academy, The Ritz, MOTH Club, The Joiners, and Rough Trade.

The Zangwills performing at Manchester Academy in February 2020.

The band release their music independently but work closely alongside AWAL/The Orchard, the independent Artist division of Sony Music Group.

== Musical style and influences ==
The Zangwills have been generally regarded as an indie rock band , with their early releases featuring bright, electric guitars and colloquial lyricism, drawing influence from Arctic Monkeys, The Strokes and Mac Demarco.

The band's sound began to evolve through the Covid pandemic and subsequent lockdowns in 2020/21. Analog synthesizers, acoustic guitars, keyboards and backing vocals became more prominent in their recordings, evident in singles Call (2020), Never Looked Back (2021) and The Feeling (2022). Their 2023 single Walking on a Wire, produced by Gordon Raphael, showcased a raw, aggressive production style, which was further explored on Collision (2024).

== Reception ==
The Zangwills have been described as "fitting smoothly into the era of early noughties indie-rock fronted by Arctic Monkeys with other sounds coming through of The Courteeners.", and "like nothing else out there, an immensely valuable quality when so many bands disappear into a slurry of sameness." They cite their influences as David Bowie, The Cure, Patti Smith and The Strokes.

Their 2020 single release Could I gained praise from national and international media, including "Their latest single ‘Could I’ is a work of art.". Speaking about the song, Vickers said: "If you listen to it loud enough, it can feel like a hug. If you smash it on some speakers and put them on your chest, it might just feel like human contact."The timing of this sentiment garnered attention from a wider global audience: "Fans worldwide will have carved out national treasure status for this band. They really rock" from the USA, and "The UK does not stop producing bands that immediately make us fall in love, for example, The Zangwills." from Germany.

Public attention and media comments such as "The Zangwills have proven their capability to consistently produce engaging indie-rock bangers" led to them passing the early milestone of a million streams on Spotify. The Band also receive consistent support from BBC Radio Merseyside and BBC Music Introducing. BBC 6's Mark Radcliffe said he, 'loved the sound and the big, chiming guitars' after interviewing the band mid-set during a performance for Sky TV's, programme Live From The Edge.

Included in various end of year round ups at the close of 2021, these included US-based All Music Magazine's renowned music photographers featuring them among their best gigs of the year across the UK & Europe and Actor Robert Carlyle selecting the band's single Never Looked Back among his favourite 50 songs of the year.

== Live ==
The Zangwills' headline dates have included sold out shows at Manchester Academy, Gorilla and Chester Live Rooms. They played their first Scottish date at Sneaky Pete's, Edinburgh in January 2019 and their first London date in May 2019. In November 2021, they played dates on England's south coast and at The Ritz in Manchester. They have supported artists such Yungblud and a satellite support for The Charlatans at their North by Northwich takeover event in May 2018.At Wychwood Festival, they shared a stage with Fun Lovin' Criminals and ABC. They played at Rivfest in 2018 and 2019, the Warrington Music Festival created in memory of Viola Beach. In February 2021, bassist Ed Dowling, along with other Warrington-based musicians, featured on a charity single to mark the 5th Anniversary of Viola Beach's accident.

They toured the United Kingdom in late 2024, visiting new cities like Glasgow, Newcastle and Bristol, and performed their largest ever headline show at Manchester's Band On The Wall in February 2025. They are scheduled to tour again in November 2026, performing in Cambridge and Plymouth for the first time.

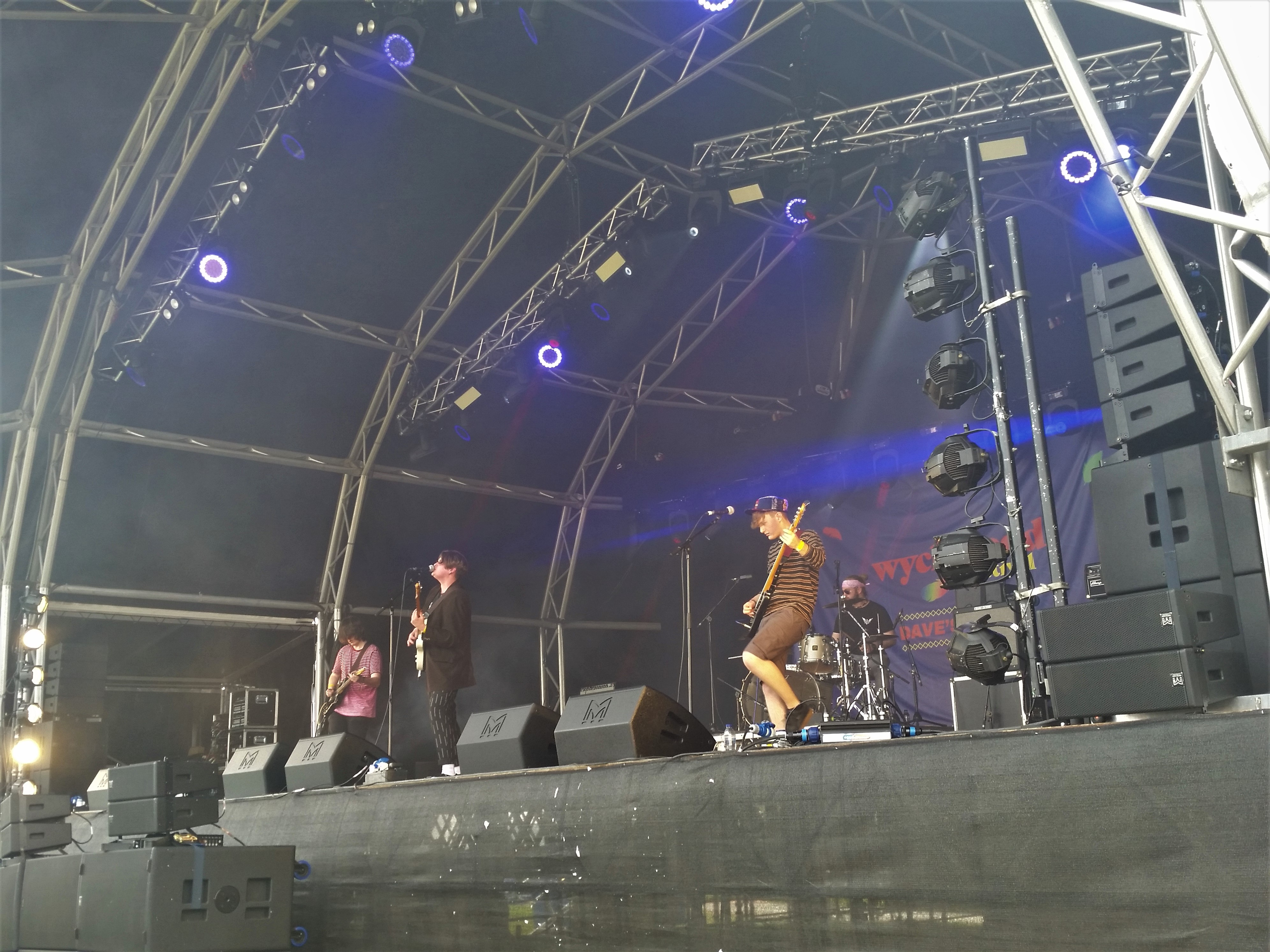
The Zangwills, Mainstage, Wychwood Festival 2019

== Band members ==
- Jack Vickers – lead vocals, rhythm guitar, synthesizers, keyboards
- Sam Davies – lead guitar
- Ed Dowling – bass guitar, backing vocals
- Adam Spence – drums, synthesizers, programming
