= Oaxen Krog =

Restaurant in Stockholm, Sweden

Coordinates: 59.3222°N 18.1017°E

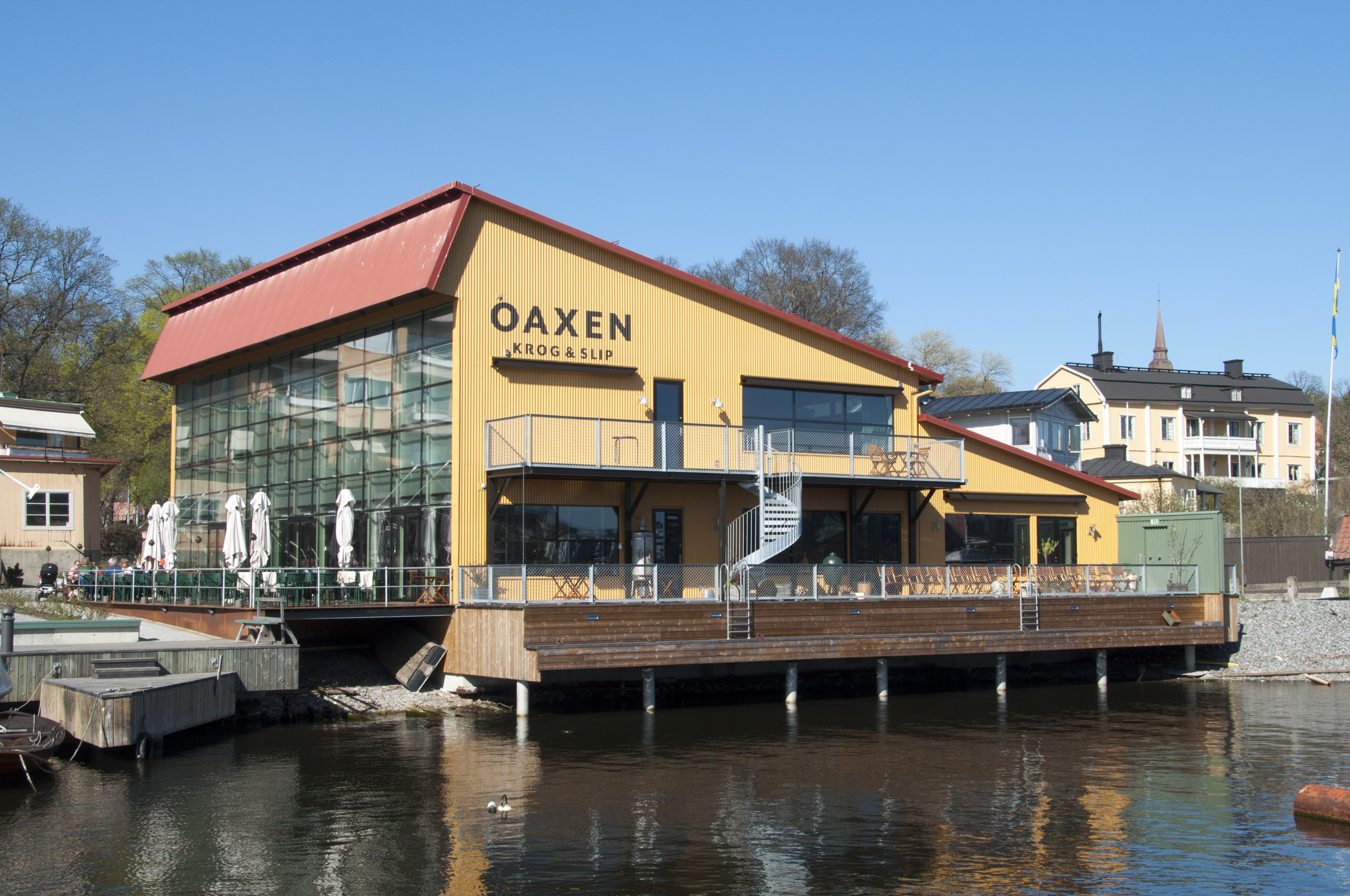
Oaxen Krog & Slip

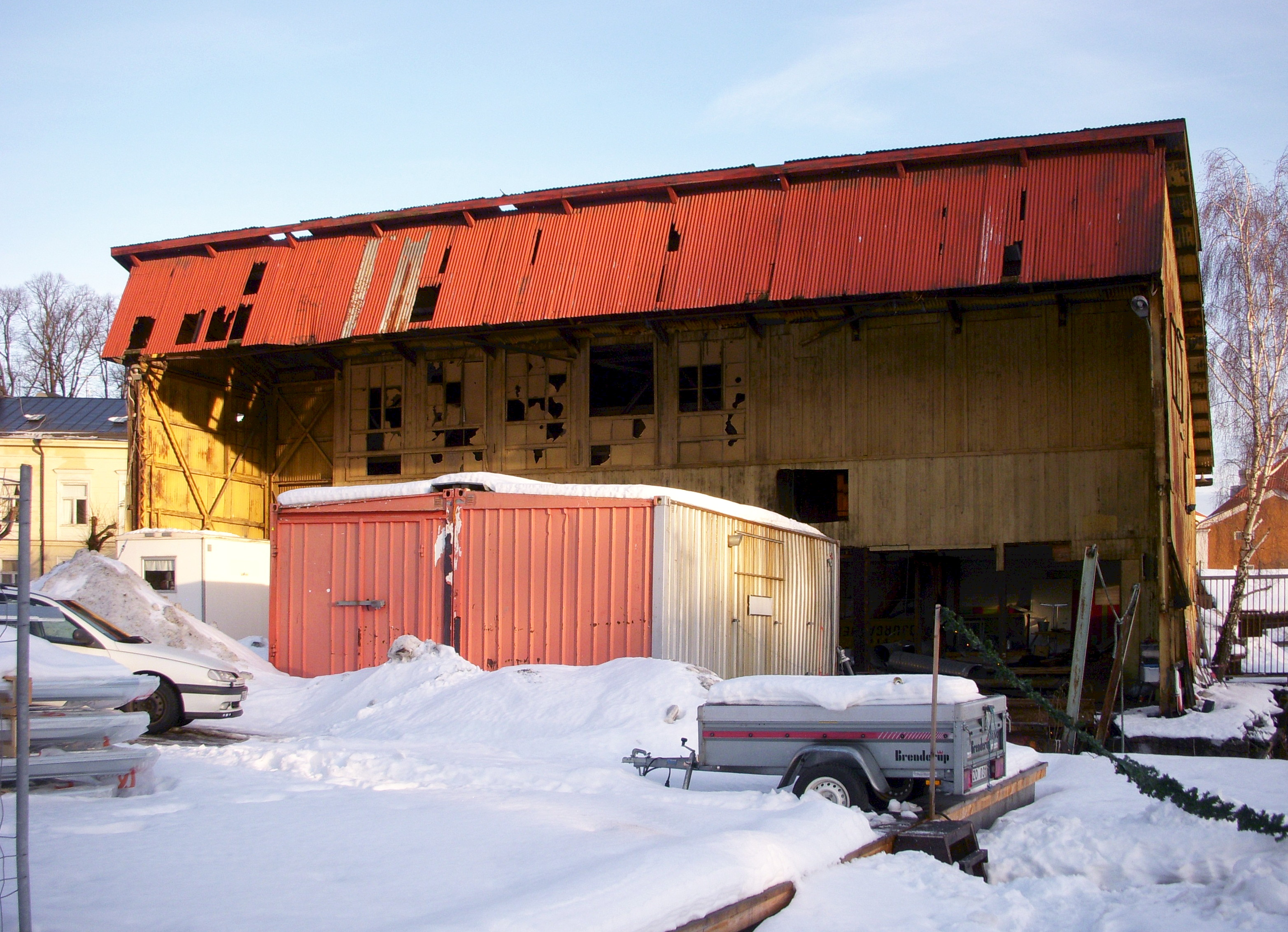
The restaurant building before its complete renovation in 2011

Oaxen Krog, also known as Oaxen Krog & Slip, previously Oaxen Skärgårdskrog, was a restaurant in Stockholm, Sweden.

== Operation ==
It was started as a luxurious restaurant in the southern part of Stockholm archipelago, situated on the island Oaxen, south of the inlet to Södertälje Canal. The restaurant was founded in 1994 by Magnus Ek and Agneta Green, developed into one of the most highly rated restaurants in Sweden and was named one of the 50 best restaurants in the world five years in a row by Restaurant Magazine.

It closed in September 2011, and in 2013 the new Oaxen Krog & Slip opened near Beckholmsbron at Djurgården in Stockholm in a new building by architects Mats Fahlander and Agneta Pettersson. In 2014, the restaurant was awarded one Michelin star and in 2015 it was awarded two stars.

Oaxen Krog had a sister restaurant Oaxen Slip in the same building and was a bistro.

The couple previously also ran a deli shop, Oaxen Skafferi, at Mariatorget in Stockholm.

The restaurant closed on 21 December 2022.
