= Manchester Academy =

Music venue in Manchester, England

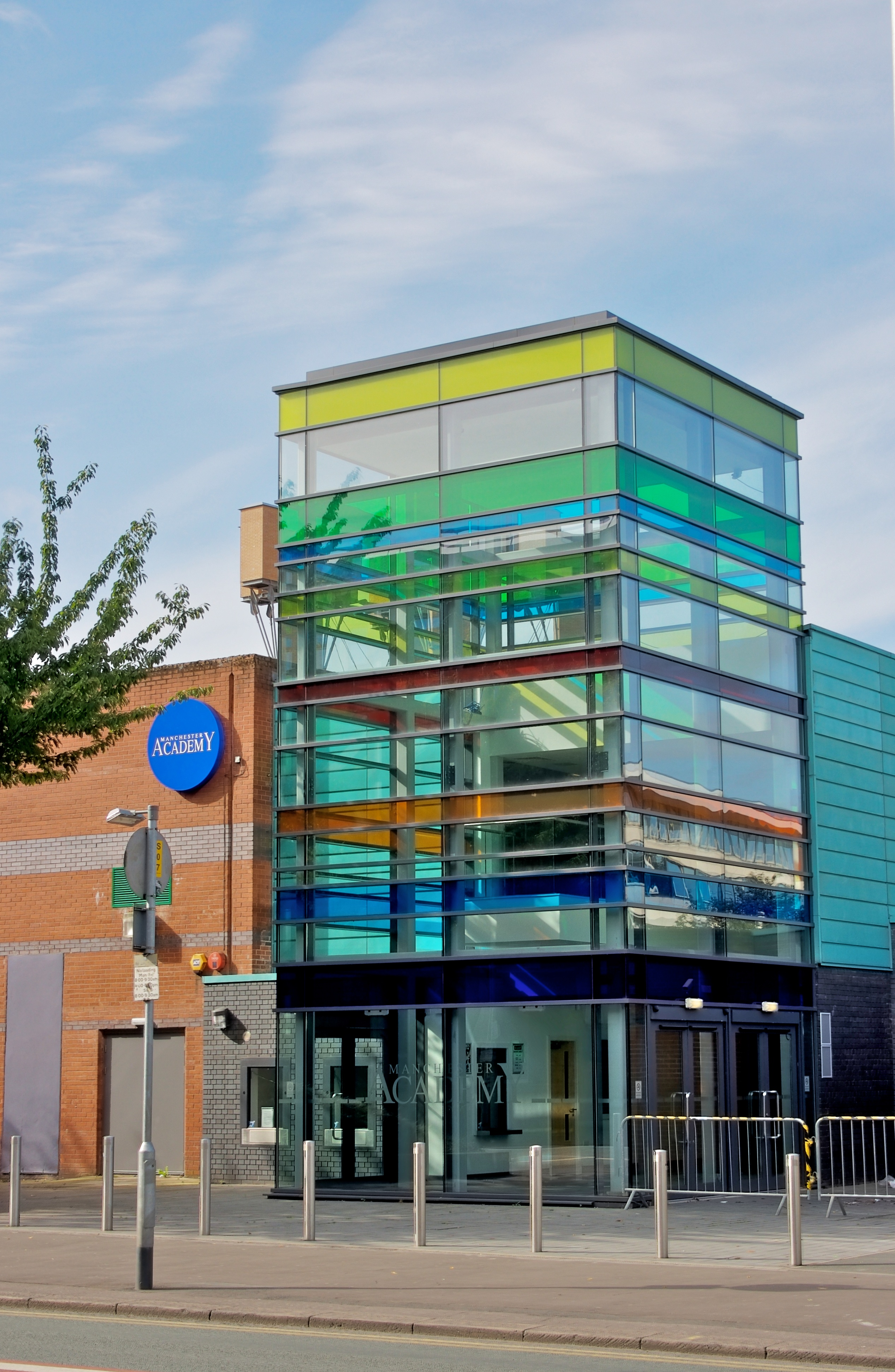
- Exterior view of 'Academy 1' (c.2009)
- Former names: University of Manchester Main Hall
- Address: Oxford Road; Manchester M13 9PL; England
- Location: Chorlton-on-Medlock
- Coordinates: 53°27′49″N 2°13′54″W
- Owner: University of Manchester Students' Union
- Operator: University of Manchester Students’ Union
- Capacity: 2,600 (Academy 1); 950 (Academy 2); 650 (Club Academy); 470 (Academy 3)

Construction
- Opened: 18 October 1990
- Renovated: 2005, 2007–08, 2016
- Cost: £1.2 million (£3.18 million in 2025 dollars)

Website
- Venue Website

The Manchester Academy, originally known as the University of Manchester Main Hall, is composed of four concert venues, located on the campus of the University of Manchester, in Manchester, England. The four venues are: Academy 1, 2 and 3 and Club Academy. Utilised by the Students' Union, the venues are housed in two buildings, the original Students' Union built in 1957 and the academy, built in 1990. In 2004, after the merging of the universities, the venues carried the "Academy" moniker. Unlike other music venues named "Academy" in the UK, Manchester Academy is not owned or managed by the Academy Music Group.

== History ==
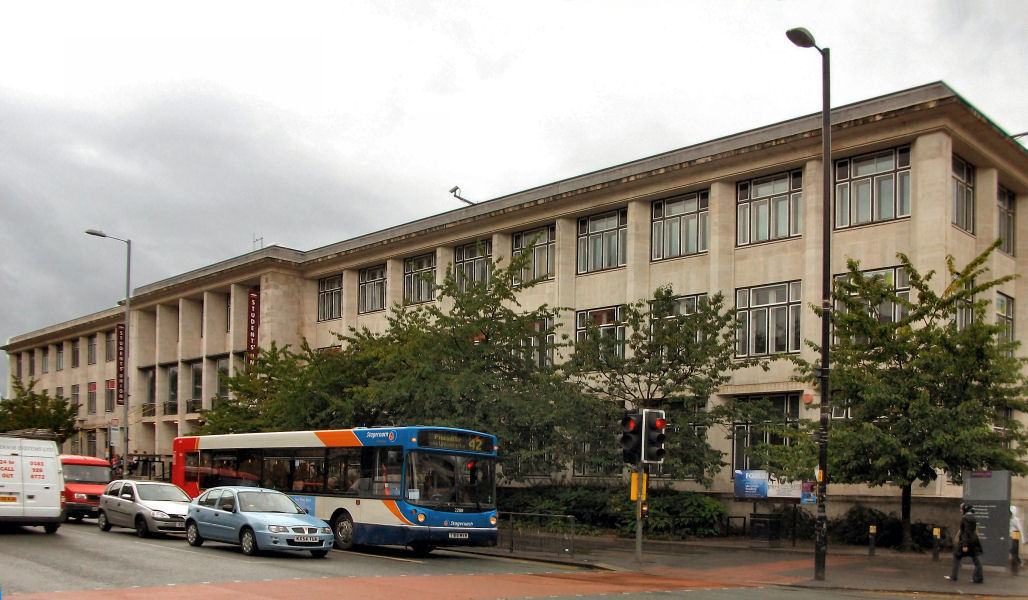
The original Students' Union building, 2010

Known as Victoria University, the Students' Union building was erected in 1957. It began hosting concerts in 1963. The venue hosted many jazz artists in its early dates. The first performance was by Humphrey Lyttelton and His Band on 16 November 1963. The main building housed three of its original venues: the University of Manchester Main Hall (now "Academy 2"), the "Hop and Grape" (later became known as "Solem Bar" and now "Academy 3") and "The Cellar" (also known as "Cellar Disco" and now "Club Academy"). Other music venues on campus were Whitworth Hall and "The Squat". After operating for eight years, the building was demolished and became a carpark. With the music scene expanding in Manchester, there was a need for a larger capacity venue on the campus. In 1984, a proposal was submitted for building a concert venue adjacent to the original Student Union.

It opened on 18 October 1990 and was first performed in by Buzzcocks. It was closed completely between March and October 2007 when a major refurbishment and rebuilding programme began, which was completed in early 2008. It had had a capacity of 2,000 and hosted around 50 gigs a year prior to closure; the capacity was increased to around 2,300 with the expansion and further increased to 2,600 in September 2013.

== Venues ==
- Academy 1: Opened in 1990 with a capacity of 1,500. At that time it was considered the third-largest concert venue in Manchester. In 2013, the capacity was increased to 2,600. Unlike the other venues, Academy 1 is in a standalone building, south of the original Students' Union. The venue is often just referred to as "Manchester Academy"
- Academy 2: Located on the first floor in the original Students' Union building, the venue was originally known as the University of Manchester Main Hall. It began to host jazz musicians in 1963. Its capacity is 950.
- Academy 3: Known as the "Hop and Grape", the venue is located on the second floor of the original building. Sometime in the 1980s, it was called the "Solem Bar". Of the four venues, it is the smallest, housing 470 guests.
- Club Academy: The third-largest venue is located in the basement of the original building. Originally known as "The Cellar" and the "Cellar Disco", the venue grew in popularity after the demolition of The Squat. It can hold up to 650 guests.

== Performers ==
The following list is composed of musicians performing at either the old or new buildings, from 1963–present.

- AC/DC
- Acid Bath
- Addison Rae
- Adele
- Against the Current
- Aimee Mann
- Alessi Rose
- AJR
- Angels & Airwaves
- As It Is
- Banks
- Bears in Trees
- Beartooth
- Billy Strings
- Black Grape
- Blue Öyster Cult
- Blur
- Big Time Rush
- Captain Beefheart
- The Chainsmokers
- Cheap Trick
- Crawlers
- Cream
- The Cure
- Coheed and Cambria
- The Damned
- Daughtry
- David Bowie
- Death Angel
- Dire Straits
- dodie
- Don Broco
- Editors
- Ellie Goulding
- Enter Shikari
- Exodus
- Fairport Convention
- Fall Out Boy
- Fozzy
- Garbage
- George Clinton
- Goldfrapp
- Goose
- Hawkwind
- Hayley Kiyoko
- Hole
- Bruno Mars
- Hundred Reasons
- Hurts
- IDLES
- Ian Brown
- Inspiral Carpets
- The Jimi Hendrix Experience
- J Hus
- Joe Cocker
- JoJo
- King Gizzard & the Lizard Wizard
- Kings of Leon
- KSI
- Kylie Minogue
- Lady Gaga
- Tove lo
- The killers
- The La's
- The Levellers
- The Libertines
- Lukas Graham
- Mabel
- Madison Beer
- Manic Street Preachers
- Marillion
- Mastodon
- Megadeth
- Milky Chance
- The Mission
- Mist
- The Moody Blues
- Morcheeba
- Muse
- Melanie C
- Nazareth
- New Found Glory
- Nirvana
- Northlane
- Oasis
- Oliver Tree
- Paramore
- Pink Floyd
- Poppy
- Prince
- Procol Harum
- Prodigy
- Queen
- Sia
- Slipknot
- Slade
- Status Quo
- Steel Panther
- The Stranglers
- Skillet
- Stevie Wonder
- Sum 41
- Super Furry Animals
- Supergrass
- Testament
- Union J
- The Velvet Underground
- The Verve
- Waterparks
- The Wailersj
- Watsky
- The Who
- The Wildhearts
- The Yardbirds
- Yung Lean
- The Zangwills
- Zebrahead

== Reception ==
Following the re-opening of Academy 1 in October 2007, the University of Manchester Students' Union came under much criticism for large parts of the refurbishment being incomplete. Customers originally had to use portable toilet facilities outside, suffered long queues for the one small bar and had no access to a cloakroom. These problems were eventually rectified with the opening of the completely rebuilt foyer, which included a sizeable bar and VIP balcony and lounge (also open to customers with disabilities).

=== Awards ===
Manchester Academy has attracted positive publicity after being referred to as the UK's "greenest venue" with a third of the £3.5 million refurbishment budget going towards minimising the environmental impact and improving the sustainability of the reconstructed venue, as well as making substantial accommodation for disabled music fans. It also received the title of "Best Entertainment Venue" in the 2007 MCR Awards.
