= The Ritz (Manchester) =

Live music venue in Manchester, England

Coordinates: 53.474494°N 2.24297°W

O_{2} Ritz
- The Ritz (1927–2015)
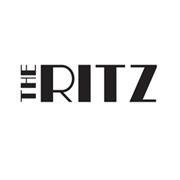

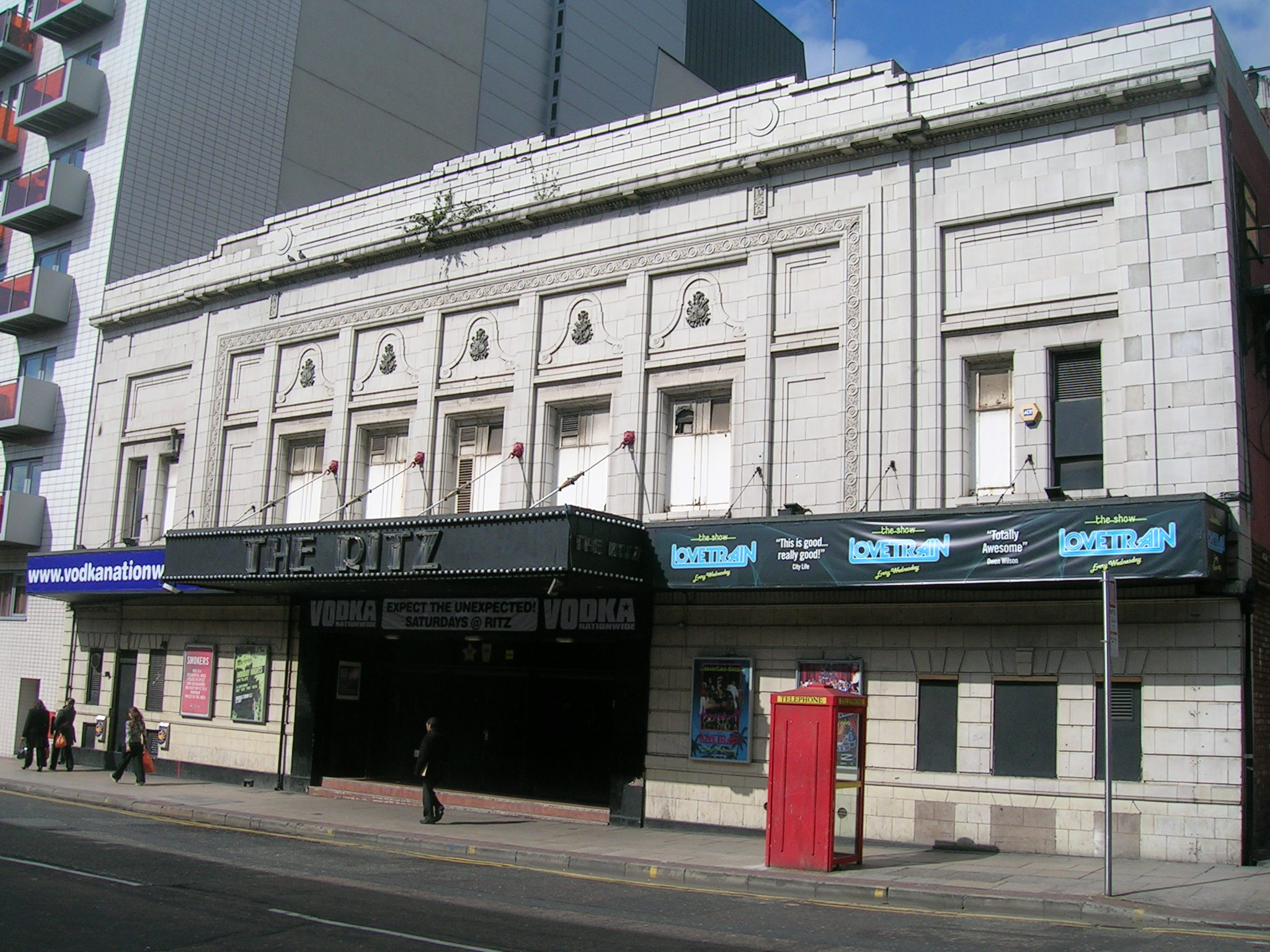
- Address: Whitworth Street West, M1 5NQ; Manchester; England
- Owner: Academy Music Group
- Capacity: 1,500
- Designation

Listed Building – Grade II
- Official name: The Ritz Dance Hall
- Designated: 5 June 1994
- Reference no.: 1254888

Construction
- Opened: 1927

Website
- Venue website

The O_{2} Ritz (originally known as The Ritz) is a live music venue on Whitworth Street West in Manchester, England. The venue is notable for its sprung dance floor and has a capacity of 1,500.

== History ==
It was originally built as a dance hall in 1927, before becoming a nightclub in the 1960s.

By the 1970s and 1980s, The Ritz was popular for playing disco, soul, funk and electronic music before the opening of The Haçienda nightclub and music venue on the same street in 1982.

On 5 June 1994, it was designated a Grade II listed building.

The Ritz was taken over by HMV in 2011 and given a £2 million refurbishment, including a new sound and lighting system, as well as soundproofing while preserving its original Art Deco features.

In 2015, the venue was acquired by Live Nation Entertainment, and re-branded as O_{2} Ritz Manchester, as part of the O_{2} Academy Group.

== Music at The Ritz ==
Most of the well-known dance bands of the 1930s and 1940s played here.

In 1961, The Ritz featured beat groups on Sunday afternoons (later replaced by bingo) such as the Fourtones (which included Allan Clarke and Graham Nash, later of the Hollies). In the 1980s, the venue hosted student/Indie discos with 'Dance your Docs off' on Monday nights. In the late 1980s, Adrian Sherwood's On-U Sound System played a couple of seminal gigs.

In the 1990s, The Ritz held its own vs Discotheque Royales, Piccadilly 21s and The Haçienda. Monday nights were 'Dance Your Docs Off', Wednesday was 'Brutus Gold's Love Train', whilst Friday and Saturday nights were hosted by Pete Smith on disc and the Vic Lazelle band live on stage.

Acts which have played at the venue include the Beatles, the Damned, R.E.M., the Stone Roses, Arctic Monkeys, the Smiths, Snow Patrol, Steve Harley & Cockney Rebel, Magazine, the Nosebleeds (fronted by Morrissey for the second and final time), John Cooper Clarke, Public Image Ltd, Happy Mondays, WARGASM, Adam Ant, New Order, Dropkick Murphys, Bad Religion, Dead Kennedys, James Marriott, the Psychedelic Furs, Sublime with Rome, the Zangwills, Swans, A Certain Ratio, Liam Gallagher, Peter Hook, Dodgy, Drain Gang, Kendrick Lamar, Hoodie Allen and Joshua Bassett.

On 4 October 1982, the Smiths played their first gig consisting of four songs, supporting Blue Rondo à la Turk.

On 1 March 2022, Drain Gang performed at The Ritz, on their Drain Gang 2022 World Tour..

The venue also occasionally hosts events run by third-party entertainment brands such as Propaganda, GoGo, Voodoo and Erasmus Parties. It used to host nightclub event on Saturdays called Lightboxx.

== In popular culture ==
The Ritz featured as a brief location in the 1961 film A Taste of Honey.

== See also ==
- Listed buildings in Manchester-M1

== Sources ==
- Robb, John (2010). The North Will Rise Again. Manchester Music City (1977–1996). London: Aurum Press. ISBN 978-1-84513-534-8.
