= Swings & Waterslides =

2015 song by Viola Beach

Single by Viola Beach

from the album Viola Beach
- Released: 27 August 2015
- Recorded: 2014–15
- Genre: Indie rock; indie pop
- Length: 3:36
- Label: Fuller Beans
- Songwriter(s): Kris Leonard; Jack Dakin; River Reeves; Tomas Lowe
- Producer(s): Sugar House

Viola Beach singles chronology
"Swings & Waterslides" (2015)	"Boys That Sing" (2016)

"Swings & Waterslides" is a song performed by English indie rock group Viola Beach. The song was released as a digital download on 27 August 2015 through Fuller Beans Records. The song peaked at number 11 on the UK Singles Chart after the four band members and their manager Craig Tarry were killed in an incident on the E4 motorway bridge at Södertälje, southwest of Stockholm, Sweden on 13 February 2016. The song is included on their posthumous debut studio album, Viola Beach. The song was written by Viola Beach and produced by Sugar House.

== Track listing ==
Digital download
No.	Title	Length
1.	"Swings & Waterslides"	3:36

== Charts ==
Chart (2016)	Peak position
UK Singles (OCC)	11
UK Indie (OCC)	1

== Certifications ==
Region	Certification	Certified units/sales
United Kingdom (BPI)	Silver	200,000^{‡}
^{‡} Sales+streaming figures based on certification alone.

== Release history ==
Region	Date	Format	Label
United Kingdom	27 August 2015	Digital download	Fuller Beans
