= Femme Schmidt =

German singer

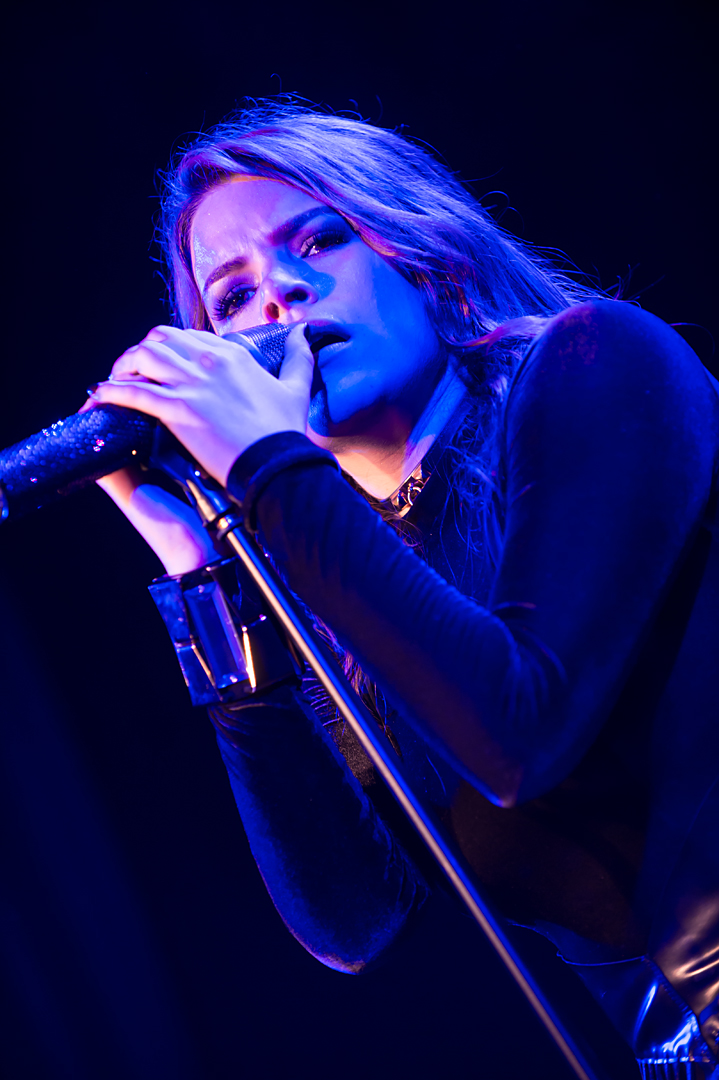
- Performing 2016 in a music club in Koblenz

Background information
- Also known as: SCHMIDT
- Born: Elisa Sophia Schmidt; 14 February 1990 (age 36); Koblenz, Germany
- Genres: Pop, jazz
- Occupations: Singer, songwriter
- Years active: 2010–present
- Label: Warner Music Germany

Elisa Sophia Schmidt (born 14 February 1990), known by the stage names Femme Schmidt and SCHMIDT, is a German singer.

== Life ==
Schmidt grew up in Koblenz. When 16, she visited Hurtwood House near Dorking, Surrey, England, where she began writing songs in English. At age 17, she left for the USA for a year, returning to Munich, Germany, afterwards for finishing school.

Since her childhood she had the wish to become a musician and worked towards that goal. In June 2010, Schmidt signed with Warner Music Group.

Schmidt lives in Berlin and London.

== Career ==
Schmidt released her first EP, Above Sin City, in October 2011. Her full-length album, Femme SCHMIDT, followed in May 2012. Schmidt Femme SCHMIDT debuted at No. 86 on the German iTunes charts. She collaborated with Guy Chambers on both releases.

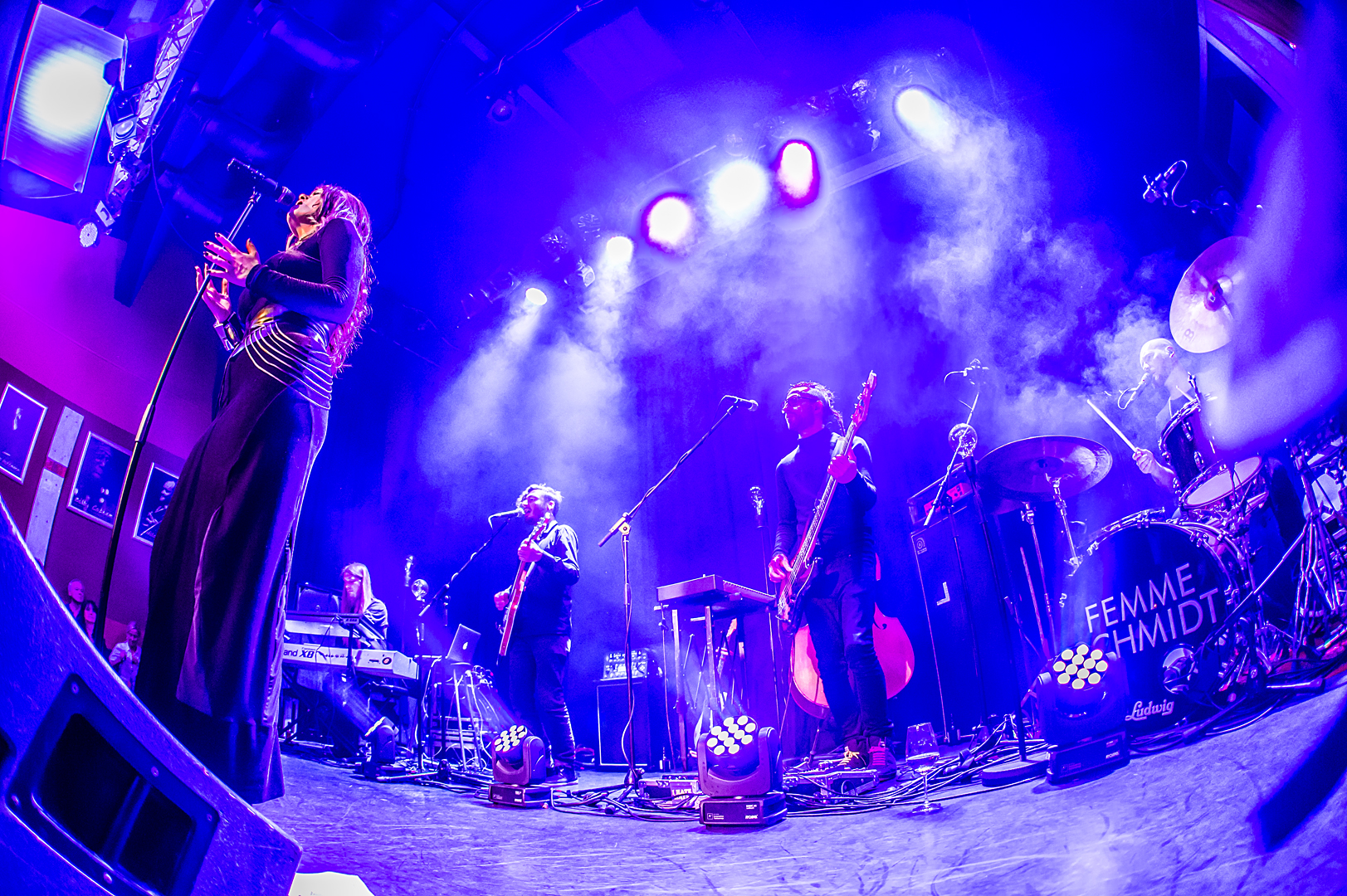
Femme Schmidt and band in a music club in Koblenz 2016

Schmidt has performed as an opening act for Melanie C, best known as a member of the Spice Girls. Later in 2012, Schmidt is scheduled to open for Elton John and Lionel Richie. In 2017 she opened some gigs of Coldplay's A Head Full of Dreams Tour.

== Music ==
Guy Chambers calls his and Schmidt's genre pop noir. Schmidt describes it as combination of cabaret-jazz and modern pop. She feels inspired by Marlene Dietrich, Kurt Weill, Billie Holiday and Norah Jones.

== Discography ==
=== Albums ===
- Above Sin City EP, Warner Music, October 2011
- Femme SCHMIDT, Warner Music, May 2012
- RAW, Warner Music, March 2016

=== Singles/EPs ===
- In the Photo Booth, Warner Music, April 2012

=== Other works ===
- Richest Girl (with Ivy Quainoo), March 2012
