= Oaxen =

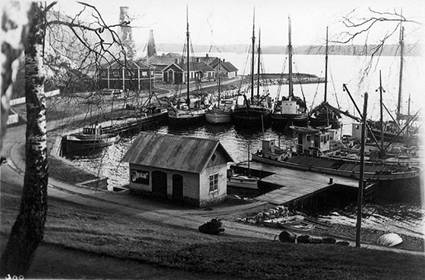
- Oaxen harbour

- Location within Stockholm Location within Southern Sweden
- Coordinates: 58°58′28″N 17°42′57″E
- Country: Sweden
- Province: Södermanland
- County: Stockholm County
- Municipality: Södertälje Municipality

Area
  - Total: 0.12 km^{2} (0.046 sq mi)

Population (2005-12-31)
  - Total: 74
  - Density: 620/km^{2} (1,600/sq mi)
- Time zone: UTC+1 (CET)
  - Summer (DST): UTC+2 (CEST)
- Website: www.oaxen.se

Oaxen (Swedish pronunciation: [ˈûːˌaksɛn]) is an island and rural locality in Södertälje Municipality, Stockholm County, Sweden.

Oaxen has rich deposits of limestone which have been mined since the 19th century.

The island is connected to the mainland with car cable ferry. The island is mostly famous for Oaxens Skärgårdskrog which was a luxurious restaurant that used to be located on Oaxen before moving to Djurgården, Stockholm.
