= Viola Beach (album) =

Studio album by Viola Beach
- Released: 29 July 2016
- Recorded: 2014–2015
- Genre: Indie rock; indie pop
- Length: 33:57
- Label: Fuller Beans
- Producer: Ian Grimble; Sugar House

Singles from Viola Beach
- 1. "Swings & Waterslides" Released: 27 August 2015; 2. "Boys That Sing" Released: 22 January 2016

Viola Beach is the only studio album by English indie rock group Viola Beach. It was released in the United Kingdom on 29 July 2016, by Fuller Beans Records. The album includes the singles "Swings & Waterslides" and "Boys That Sing". The album peaked to number one on the UK Albums Chart.

== Background ==
The album was announced on 17 June for release on 29 July 2016, and consists of 9 tracks including "Boys That Sing" and a BBC session. The album was released on the band's own Fuller Beans Records label. The announcement was accompanied by a statement from Viola Beach's families. To mark the release, a mixed-media animation video was released for the single "Boys That Sing" in July 2016.

== Singles ==
"Swings & Waterslides" was released as the lead single from the album on 27 August 2015. The song peaked to number 11 on the UK Singles Chart, after the four band members and their manager Craig Tarry were killed in an incident on the E4 motorway bridge at Södertälje, southwest of Stockholm, Sweden on 13 February 2016. "Boys That Sing" was released as the second single from the album on 22 January 2016. The song peaked at number 50 on the UK Singles Chart.

== Chart performance ==
On 1 August 2016, the album was at number one on The Official Chart Update, 6,000 combined sales ahead of Electric Light Orchestra's album, All Over the World: The Very Best of Electric Light Orchestra. On 5 August 2016, Viola Beach entered the UK Albums Chart at number one. After the album got to number one, the families of the band said: "The tragic circumstance that met Viola Beach and their manager Craig that fateful night in Sweden will not now define their lives. What will now define their lives and what they will be remembered for, forever, is the music they were so passionate about making together. For that, we will be eternally humbled and ever thankful to every single person who, by buying this glorious album, has invested in their lasting musical legacy."

== Track listing ==
All songs were written by Kris Leonard, Jack Dakin, River Reeves and Tomas Lowe.

No.	Title	Producer(s)	Length
1.	"Swings and Waterslides"	Sugar House	3:39
2.	"Like a Fool"	Ian Grimble	2:51
3.	"Go Outside"	Grimble	3:48
4.	"Cherry Vimto"	Sugar House	3:38
5.	"Drunk"	Grimble	4:09
6.	"Really Wanna Call"	Grimble	3:43
7.	"Call You Up"	Grimble	4:58
8.	"Get to Dancing" (Live BBC Session)		3:55
9.	"Boys That Sing"	Grimble	3:16

== Charts ==
Chart performance for Viola Beach
Chart (2016)	Peak position
Irish Albums (IRMA)	29
Scottish Albums (OCC)	1
UK Albums (OCC)	1

== Certifications ==
Region	Certification	Certified units/sales
United Kingdom (BPI)	Gold	100,000^{‡}
^{‡} Sales+streaming figures based on certification alone.

== Release history ==
Release history and formats for Viola Beach
Region	Release date	Format	Label
United Kingdom	29 July 2016	Digital download; CD	Fuller Beans
