= Priestley College =

Location
- Loushers Lane; Warrington, Cheshire, England, WA4 6RD; 53°22′46″N 2°35′00″W

Information
- Type: Sixth form college
- Established: 1979
- Local authority: Warrington
- Department for Education URN: 130624 Tables
- Ofsted: Reports
- Principal: James Gresty
- Gender: Mixed
- Age: 16 to 18
- Enrolment: 2,588 (March 2007)
- Colours: Medium blue, white
- Website: http://www.priestley.ac.uk

Priestley Sixth Form and Community College is a sixth form college in Warrington, Cheshire, England. It also offers adult courses and professional training on another site, and is an associate college of the University of Salford. The college offers a range of courses, including AS/A2 Levels, BTECs, Advanced Diplomas, functional skills, and pre-university foundation courses.

== History ==
The college opened in 1979, though it was originally a female-only grammar school called Warrington Girls' High School (and later Warrington High School for Girls) until 1974, and was administered by Warrington Education Committee. It was addressed as being on Menin Avenue until 1998, when it became administered by the Warrington borough, previously being under Cheshire Education Committee. The college's current name is in honour of clergyman, chemist, and educator Joseph Priestley (1733–1804), a pioneer in teaching modern history and the sciences who is perhaps best known for discovering oxygen in 1774. A statue of him now stands inside the main entrance of the college.

== Structure ==
It is a single campus college with seven buildings:

- The Priestley Building houses the Viola Beach Café, administrative facilities, the finance department, and classrooms for graphics, biology, chemistry, physics, performing arts, and foreign languages. The Viola Beach Café, formerly known as the Wicked Café, was renamed following the death of the members of the rock band Viola Beach and their manager (all former Priestley students) in a car accident in the Swedish city of Södertälje during their 2016 tour.
- The Art Centre, completed in 2013, provides spare classrooms for creative art, textiles, and computer graphic design.
- The Design Centre holds classrooms for 3D design and woodworking.
- The Sports Centre has sports halls and resources for sports and physical education.
- The Learning Resource Centre houses offices, the library, communal computers, and open-plan teaching areas.
- The Crescent Building, completed in 2007, holds student services, a cafe, reception, and personnel, as well as classrooms for the departments of humanities, English, public services, law, business studies, religious studies, accounting, geography, and geology.
- The Lewis Carroll building, completed in 2014, holds rooms for ICT.

== Academic performance ==
In 2007, the college was ranked "Outstanding" after an Ofsted inspection.

In 2016, 89% of those graduating stayed in education or employment for at least two terms after studying at A level or level 3 vocational courses. 3.5% of students achieved AAB or higher in at least two facilitating subjects at A level, 12.7% below the national average.

In 2018, the A* to B pass rate at the college was 38.2% and 68% of vocational grades were Distinction or Distinction*.

== Transport connections ==
The college is an approximately 20 minute walk from the town centre.

Cheshire Cat Buses serve Wilderspool Causeway, which passes the college. Services operate to Warrington Bus Interchange and in the opposite direction to Altrincham, Grappenhall, Hatton, Northwich, and Stockton Heath. These services combine to provide buses from the college to the Bus Interchange and Stockton Heath every 10 minutes. The service 62 operates to Runcorn Shopping City and Warrington Bus Interchange in the opposite direction. This route is operated jointly between Warrington's Own Buses and Halton Transport.

The college also operates its own buses for students in conjunction with Warrington's Own Buses:

- P1 – Helsby and Runcorn via Daresbury
- P2 – Great Sankey, Hough Green, Penketh, and Widnes
- P5 – Cadishead, Hollins Green, Irlam, and Woolston
- P6 – Golborne, Leigh, Lowton, Newton-le-Willows, and Winwick
- 18 – Burtonwood and Westbrook
- 19 – Croft, Culcheth, and Winwick
- 25 – Birchwood

Services 18, 19, and 25 are regular passenger services that see their routes extended at certain times so that they originate or terminate at Priestley College rather than Warrington Interchange. From the 2018/19 academic year, services P3 and P4 were removed. The P4 was replaced by services 19 and 25.

== Notable alumni ==
- George Bebbington, reality television star and media personality attended the college.
- Viola Beach, a rock band whose members all attended the college.
