= Södertälje Canal =

Canal in Sweden

Coordinates: 59°11′35.34″N 17°37′55.85″E

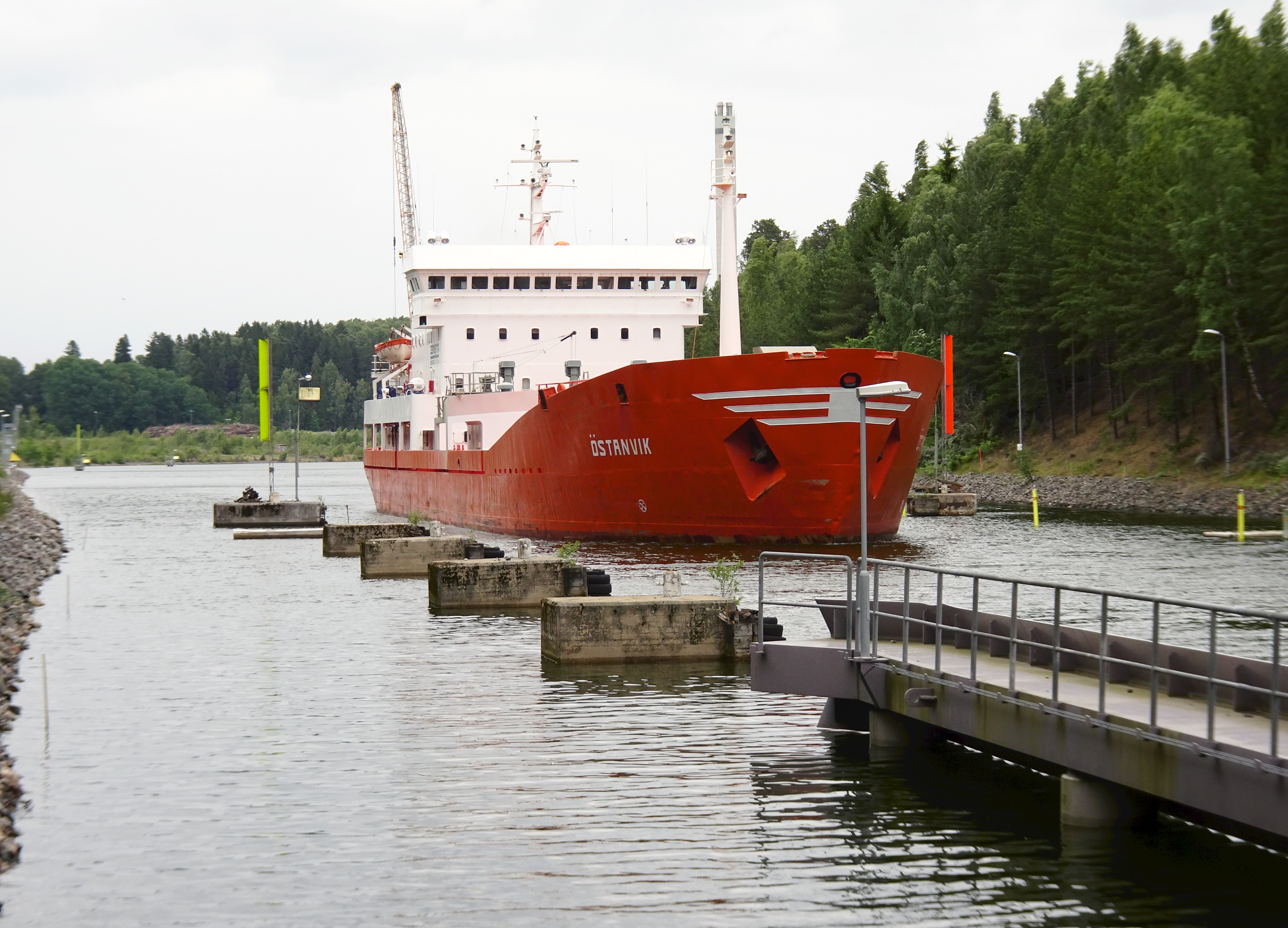
M/S Östanvik i Södertälje Canal.

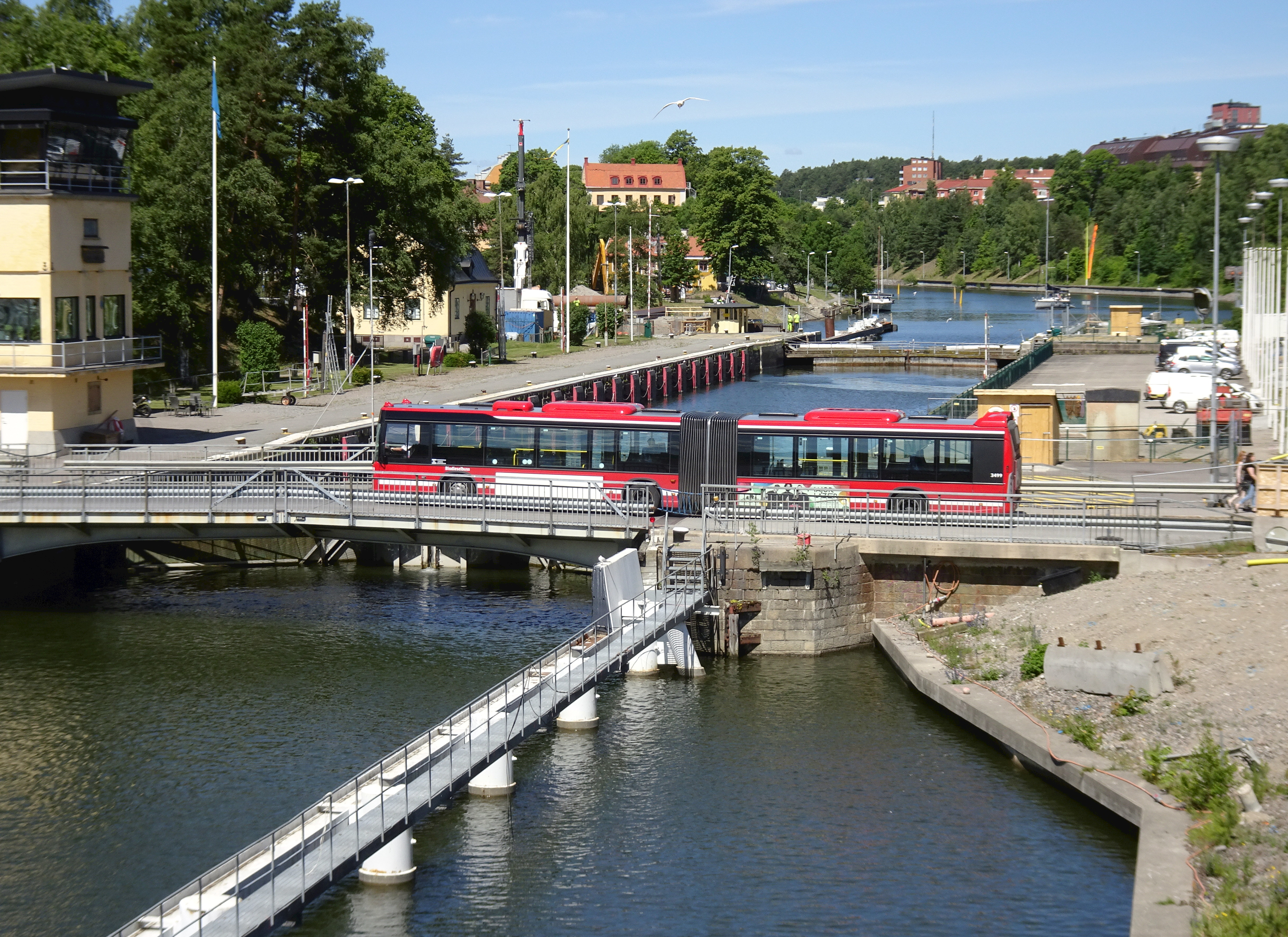
Södertälje lock.

The Södertälje Canal (Swedish: Södertälje kanal) is a canal connecting the lake Mälaren with the Baltic Sea, at the city of Södertälje. It is 5.2 km long, and it has one lock. The size of this lock is the largest in Scandinavia by allowed ship size. The lock is 135 m long and 17 m wide. The water level difference between Mälaren and the Baltic Sea is not large, on average 0.6 m (2 ft). This is the main shipping route into the lake Mälaren.

== History ==
In the Viking age the passage was navigable by boats, but the Post-glacial rebound made it unusable. In the year 1819 a lock was finished, so boats could use the canal. In 1924 a much larger lock (that remains in use today) was built and the canal was widened and deepened.

== Recent events on the main bridge over the approach to the canal ==
On the approach from the Baltic Sea to the canal itself there is the Bridge of Södertälje, actually 4 bridges (2 for the Motorway E4/E20, 1 for the local traffic and 1 for the trains).

- On 13 February 2016 all 4 members of the British band Viola Beach, along with their manager, were killed when their van struck the middle section of the bridge as it was being raised for a large ship passing through the canal.
- On 24 June 2016 an accident involving two trucks damaged the bridge so much that it had to be closed in one direction for a long time, creating traffic problems because it is the only connection directly southwards from Stockholm apart from 2 smaller bridges in the city of Södertälje itself.

== See also ==
- Karl Johanslussen
