= Boys That Sing =

Single by Viola Beach

from the album Viola Beach
- Released: 22 January 2016
- Recorded: 2015
- Genre: Indie rock; indie pop
- Length: 3:13
- Label: Fuller Beans
- Songwriters: Kris Leonard; Jack Dakin; River Reeves; Tomas Lowe
- Producer: Ian Grimble

Viola Beach singles chronology
"Swings & Waterslides" (2015)	"Boys That Sing" (2016)

Music video
- "Boys That Sing" on YouTube

"Boys That Sing" is a song performed by English indie rock group Viola Beach. The song was released as a digital download on 22 January 2016 through Fuller Beans Records. It was to be the last single released by Viola Beach before their deaths in February 2016. Debuting at number 80 on the UK Singles Chart, the song later peaked at number 50 after the four band members and their manager Craig Tarry were killed in an incident on the E4 motorway bridge at Södertälje, southwest of Stockholm, Sweden on 13 February 2016. The song was included on their posthumous debut studio album. It peaked at number 50 after Coldplay covered the song as a tribute at the 2016 Glastonbury Festival. The song was written by Viola Beach and produced by Ian Grimble. The single also features a B-side titled 'Like A Fool'.

== Music video ==
To mark the release of the group's self-titled album, a mixed-media animation video was released for the single in July 2016. The video includes a mixture of live action footage taken in Warrington, the group's hometown, with animated characters and footage of the group.

== Track listing ==
Digital download
No.	Title	Length
1.	"Boys That Sing"	3:13
2.	"Like a Fool"	2:51

== Charts ==
Chart (2016)	Peak position
UK Singles (Official Charts)	50

== Certifications ==
Region	Certification	Certified units/sales
United Kingdom (BPI)	Gold	400,000^{‡}
^{‡} Sales+streaming figures based on certification alone.

== Release history ==
Region	Date	Format	Label
United Kingdom	22 January 2016	Digital download	Fuller Beans
