= Viola Beach =

English indie rock group

- Viola Beach in 2015 (left to right) River Reeves, Kris Leonard, Tomas Lowe, Jack Dakin

Background information
- Origin: Warrington, England
- Genres: Indie rock; indie pop
- Years active: 2013–2016
- Labels: Fuller Beans; Communion
- Past members: Kris Leonard; River Reeves; Tomas Lowe; Jack Dakin; Frankie Coulson; Jonny Gibson

Viola Beach were an English indie rock group formed in Warrington in 2013. The band's final line-up consisted of Kris Leonard (vocals, guitar), River Reeves (guitar), Tomas Lowe (bass), and Jack Dakin (drums). All four, along with their manager Craig Tarry, were killed during their first overseas tour when their car fell from a bridge in the Swedish city of Södertälje on 13 February 2016. As of 2026, founding members Frankie Coulson (guitar) and Jonny Gibson (bass) are the last surviving members of the band.

In the week following the crash, their single "Boys That Sing" entered the UK Singles Chart at No. 80 and their previous single "Swings & Waterslides" entered at No. 11 following a public campaign to boost sales. In the same week, "Swings & Waterslides" also entered at No. 3 on the sales-only chart (which excludes streaming data) and "Boys That Sing" entered at No. 27 on the same chart. On 29 July 2016, the self-titled album was posthumously released. It reached No. 1 on the UK Albums Chart on 5 August 2016.

== Career ==
Viola Beach formed in Warrington in May 2013, the original members being Kris Leonard (guitar and vocals), Frankie Coulson (guitar), Jonny Gibson (bass), and Jack Dakin (drums). The band's final line-up was formed when Coulson and Gibson opted to leave the band in 2015 in order to focus on their university studies, and were replaced by River Reeves (guitar) and Tomas Lowe (bass) respectively.

By September of their formation year, their track "Daisies" was featured on Bandcamp's The Indie Cassette Player's (now known as The Mill Records) second compilation album, with "Love My Love" being featured on the website's third compilation album in October. The band's Twitter profile tweeted on 16 September 2013 "Daisies is being featured on @IndieCassPlayer compilation vol 2 this month which is dead lovely!"

The band self-financed the recording of their first single, "Swings & Waterslides", releasing it on their own record label Fuller Beans. The track was produced by Ady Hall and Lee McCarthy of Sugar House and recorded at Catalyst Studios in St Helens. "Swings & Waterslides" was added to the BBC Radio 1 playlist in September 2015.

The band were supported by BBC Introducing, a platform for emerging musical talent, which described their songs as "infectious anthems" with "hints of slacker pop". They performed at the BBC Introducing Stage of the 2015 Reading and Leeds Festivals. In November 2015, the band recorded a live session for BBC Radio 1. They released their second single, "Boys That Sing"/"Like a Fool", on the Communion label on 22 January 2016.

On 17 June 2016, the band's self-titled debut album Viola Beach was announced for release on 29 July, to consist of nine tracks including "Boys That Sing" and a BBC session, and released on the band's own Fuller Beans Records label. The announcement was accompanied by a statement from the members' families. It reached No. 1 on the UK Albums Chart on 5 August.

== Influences ==
When asked about his musical influences, singer-guitarist Kris Leonard said, "I'm definitely not consciously influenced by anyone", but mentioned the Coral, the Zutons, the Beatles and Hooton Tennis Club as being among his favourite Liverpool bands. He also said the Kooks' debut studio album Inside In/Inside Out played a big part in him becoming a musician. BBC Introducing recommended the band to fans of Coasts and the Kooks, while other critics drew comparisons with 1990s Britpop.

Leonard told Wonderland magazine that much of the band's lyrical content was inspired by their "very grey and industrial" hometown, where there was "nothing to do other than drink cider and smoke rollies on a park and chase after girls".

== Deaths ==
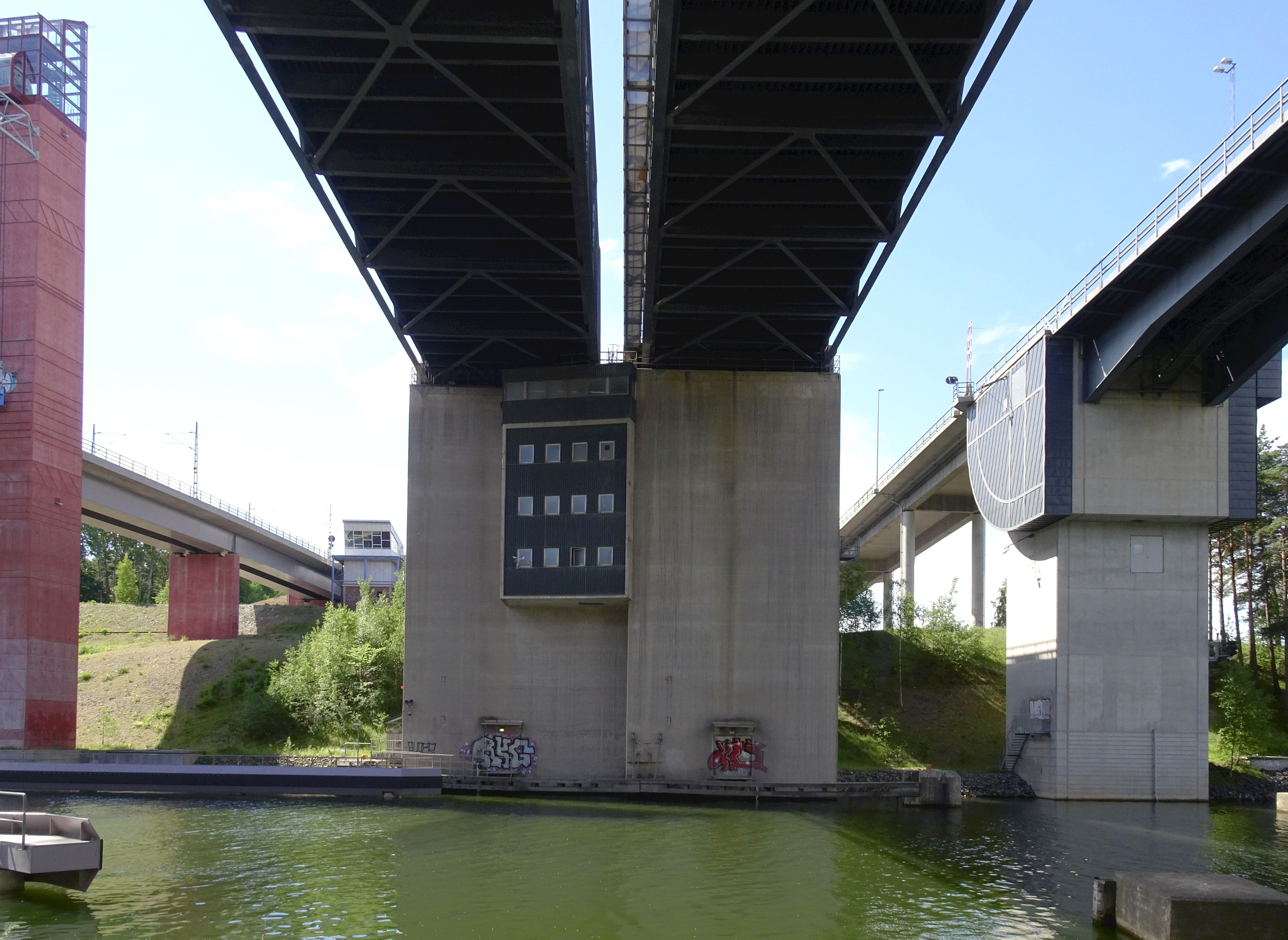
The bridges over the Södertälje Canal; the incident took place on the centre bridge

In the early hours of 13 February 2016, while driving past the Swedish town of Södertälje, all four band members were killed alongside their manager Craig Tarry in a car accident on a lift bridge along the E4 motorway. At around 2:00 am, witnesses saw the band's Nissan Qashqai clip a stationary vehicle, drive through closed barriers, and fall into the Södertälje Canal through a gap in a bridge whose middle section was being lifted to let an oil tanker pass. The band had played the previous day at the Where's the Music? Festival in Norrköping and were returning to their hotel at Arlanda Airport.

The Swedish Police Authority opened an inquiry. Among their initial findings was that the driver, whose identity was not revealed as Tarry until an inquest was held, had no traces of alcohol or drugs in his blood. It was also found that the car had braked before reaching the bridge, which, as the police stated, ruled out the possibility that Tarry had fallen asleep. However, the incident ultimately remained "completely inexplicable".

In the United Kingdom, inquests into the deaths were opened and adjourned on 3 March at Warrington Coroner's Court by coroner Nicholas Rheinberg, who also released the bodies of the five men so their families could make funeral arrangements. In December 2016, Rheinberg recorded a verdict of "road traffic collision". Rheinberg's official Coroner Report stated that bassist Tomas Lowe initially survived the injuries inflicted by the impact and drowned, while the others were already dead from head injuries inflicted by the impact before the vehicle entered the water.

Following analysis of video from a traffic camera, Swedish police offered a description of the events. After the bridge barriers were lowered, two lorries were standing in the right-hand lane of the carriageway and two cars were standing in the left-hand lane, in front of the first set of barriers. The band's car arrived in the left lane, braked, and then swerved left, narrowly passing the first car before continuing. The driver in the front stationary car estimated the speed of the band's vehicle at 60 km/h (37 mph). He said their vehicle then drove through both sets of barriers without braking. It subsequently struck the middle section of the bridge, which had been lifted by 1.5 m (4 ft 11 in), and fell 30 m (98 ft) into the canal. It was suggested that the initial impact against the bridge may have been violent enough to cause the death of the car's occupants. The police concluded that Tarry acted intentionally. The inquest heard that the car's speed was 108 km/h (67 mph).

== Reactions ==
On 14 February, the day the news was announced, there was a round of applause for the band at the Premier League match between Manchester City and Tottenham Hotspur. The band's manager Craig Tarry was a noted Manchester City supporter. Tributes were made at The Lounge, the club where they began their careers, and Warrington Town Hall flew its flag at half-staff in the week following their deaths.

The band had been scheduled to support Blossoms on a tour of the UK and Ireland during February and March 2016, and to play at the South by Southwest music festival in Texas in March 2016. Other scheduled appearances in 2016 included The Great Escape Festival and T in the Park. Viola Beach had also been booked to play at their hometown venues Pyramid in March and Parr Hall in October.

A social media campaign was initiated by fans to get the band's single "Swings & Waterslides" to the top of the UK Singles Chart. The campaign later drew support from musicians Liam Gallagher and Ian Brown, and the members of rock band Kasabian. The single appeared at No. 39 in the Official Chart Update published 15 February 2016, and climbed to No. 11 by the end of the week. On 18 February it had briefly reached No. 1 on the iTunes chart.

Following news of the band members' deaths, it was announced that all proceeds from their latest single would be donated to the families of the band members and of their manager. On 18 February Blossoms, who had performed with the band in Leamington Spa, Warwickshire, two days before their deaths, announced they would play a recording of the Leamington concert at a gig in Bournemouth that evening. They also planned to showcase the band's material on the tour where Viola Beach were scheduled to support them.

On 2 April 2016, a tribute concert was staged at Warrington's Parr Hall, with performances by several of the band's friends and influences, including the Coral, the Courteeners, the Kooks, and Blossoms. The Zutons also made a "rare live appearance" at the event.

The band had recorded songs for a five- or six-track EP, which was scheduled to be released in 2016. When asked about the possibility of further recordings being released, the band's agent was quoted as saying, "There's a lot of music, a lot of demos, a lot of amazing songs, and it'd be great if it got out, but at the moment, everybody's still grieving. We need to sit down and work out what we do with it."

On 26 June 2016, Coldplay, led by Chris Martin, paid tribute to Viola Beach at Glastonbury Festival 2016 during their set by covering the band's song "Boys That Sing" and encouraged fans to buy the single and "send it up the charts". A tribute was also scheduled into the first day of Leeds Festival 2016, with a short documentary originally heard on Radio 1 played on the TV screens of the main stage.

On 13 February 2017, Arriva Buses launched five buses in the band's home town of Warrington, each vehicle bearing a picture of one of the band members and their manager. Arriva collaborated with the River Reeves Foundation, an organisation founded by Reeves' family, to produce the vehicles, one of which would be a mobile recording studio. In September 2017, Reeves' father, Ben Dunne, organised RivFest 17, a music event aimed at inspiring those with a talent for the arts to follow their dreams. The concert was held at Warrington's Priestley College on 2 September, and featured headline appearances by Maxïmo Park and Billy Bragg.

In February 2021, to mark the 5th anniversary of the incident, a group of Warrington-based musicians were invited to collaborate to record a cover version of Viola Beach's song Swings & Waterslides with all proceeds going to charities chosen by the band's families. The track was produced by Cal Bate, sound engineer for Viola Beach and Blossoms, along with WAM Warrington Music. The tribute featured contributions from members of A.V Club, Sienne, Uno Mas, Crawlers, The K's, Aligners, Filthy Tricks and The Zangwills. It was premiered on 5 February by Steve Lamacq on BBC Radio 6 Music and had further support on TV from BBC North West Tonight.

On 25 September 2021, a bronze frieze in memory of the band was unveiled near Parr Hall in Warrington, whilst the Victoria Park-based festival Neighbourhood Weekender named a stage in their honour, with Retro Video Club and The Royston Club headlining the stage in 2022.

== Members ==
Final line-up

- Kris Leonard – lead vocals, guitar (2013–2016)
- Jack Dakin – drums, occasional backing vocals (2013–2016)
- River Reeves – guitar, backing vocals (2015–2016)
- Tomas Lowe – bass (2015–2016)

Former members

- Frankie Coulson – guitar, backing vocals (2013–2015)
- Jonny Gibson – bass (2013–2015)

== Discography ==
=== Albums ===
Title	Details	Peak chart positions			Certifications
Title	Details	UK	IRE	SCO	Certifications
Viola Beach	Release date: 29 July 2016; Label: Fuller Beans Records; Formats: Digital download, CD	1	29	1	BPI: Gold

=== Singles ===
Year	Title	Peak chart positions			Certifications	Album
Year	Title	UK	UK Indie	SCO	Certifications	Album
2015	"Swings & Waterslides"	11	1	6	BPI: Silver	Viola Beach
2016	"Boys That Sing"	50	—	22	BPI: Gold	Viola Beach
"—" denotes a recording that did not chart or was not released in that territory.
