= MOTH Club =

Music venue in Hackney, London

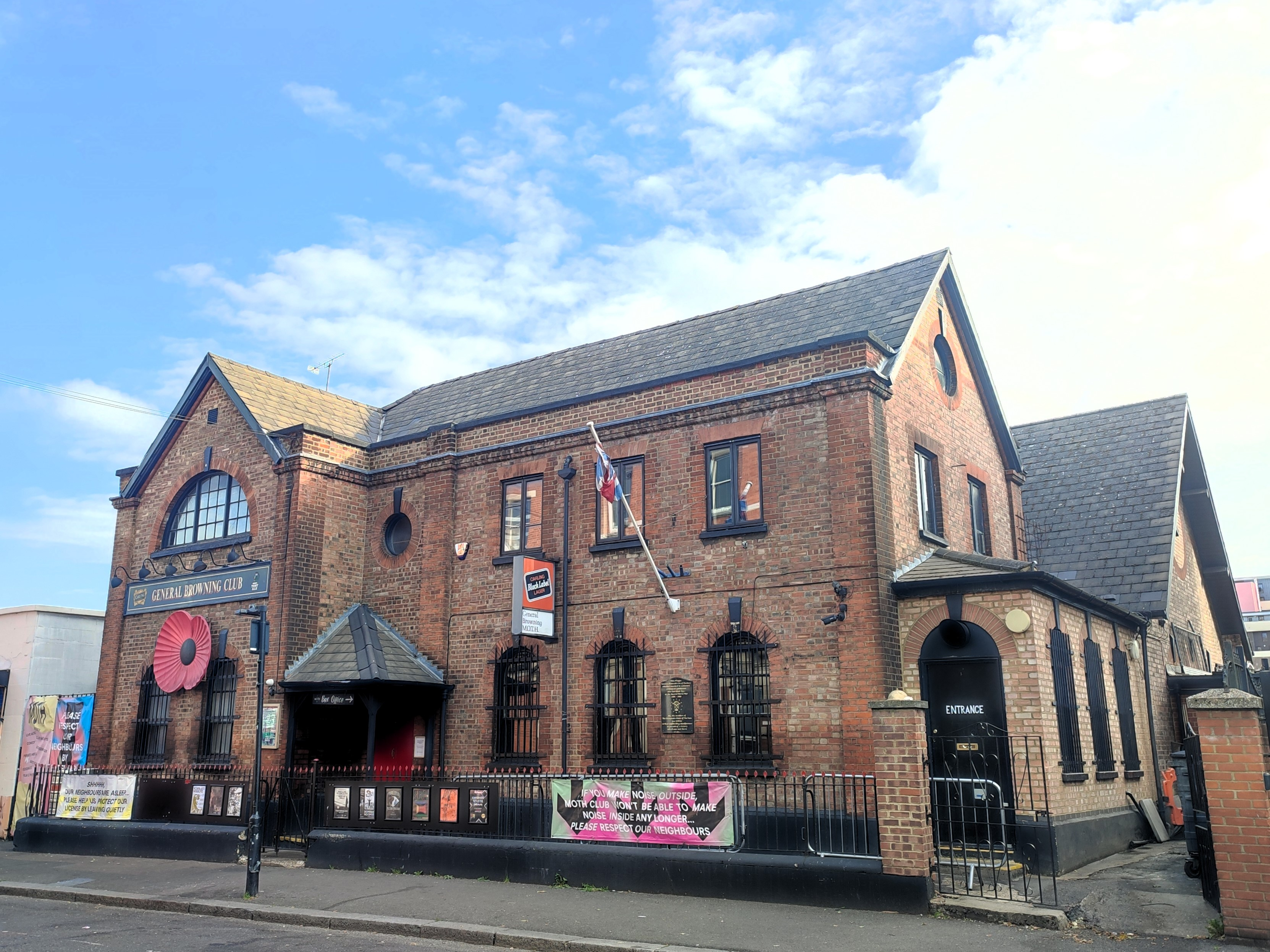
- Photo of the exterior
- Interactive map of MOTH Club
- Coordinates: 51.5456817°N 0.0545582°W

Website
- mothclub.co.uk

MOTH Club is a music venue based in Hackney, London that opened in August 2015. It takes its name as the pub, originally named the General Browning, was the Hackney headquarters for the Memorable Order of Tin Hats.

The intimate venue has played host to several secret gigs by big name artists. September 2016 saw Lady Gaga play a secret show there. In September 2022, Suede performed a secret gig there as Crushed Kid.

In September 2024, the venue asked local residents to oppose the building of flats nearby, which they worried could “pose a serious threat” to the venue.
