= Been Undone =

Single by Peter Gabriel

from the album O\I
- Released: 3 January 2026
- Studio: Real World (Wiltshire); The Beehive (London)
- Length: 7:40 (Dark-Side Mix); 6:48 (Bright-Side Mix)
- Label: Real World
- Songwriter: Peter Gabriel
- Producer: Peter Gabriel

Peter Gabriel singles chronology
"Live and Let Live" (2023)	"Been Undone" (2026)	"Put the Bucket Down" (2026)

"Been Undone" is a song by English musician Peter Gabriel, released through Real World Records. Written and produced by Gabriel, it is the lead single from his forthcoming eleventh studio album O\I. Like all songs from O\I and the preceding I/O (2023), the release of "Been Undone" corresponded with the lunar cycle and also received multiple mixes, including a Bright Side mix by Mark "Spike" Stent and a Dark Side mix by Tchad Blake.

The song's Dark-Side mix was released on 3 January 2026 to coincide with the Wolf Moon. The song's Bright-Side Mix was released on 18 January 2026 on its corresponding new moon and is 52 seconds shorter than the Dark-Side Mix.

== Background ==
Aspects of "Been Undone" were taken from a chord progression and series of guitar riffs by David Rhodes on a demo titled "Sit", which had been created roughly 30 years prior, in October 1996 during the Up sessions. Gabriel had developed the chord sequence of "Been Undone" in the Writing Room of Real World Studios. Additional parts were recorded at The Beehive in London.

Gabriel revisited "Been Undone" in October 2025, recording it with Rhodes, Tony Levin, and Manu Katché at Real World Studios, where it was the final song developed for O/I. Stereogum described the song as having a "pleasant, loping groove and lyrics that reference mitochondria and the Mandelbrot set."

Gabriel said that there were "many songs as possible first candidates" as the first release from the 'O\I album. He ultimately settled on "Been Undone" to fulfill this role.

The cover art for the single is Ciclotrama 156 (Palindrome) by Brazilian artist Janaina Mello Landini. Commenting the artwork in a press release, Gabriel said that unravelled rope in the artwork resembled "fractals or tree trunks" and expressed his belief that it "looks like the brain in some ways too". Gabriel also mentioned that Landini would create a different piece of artwork specifically for the track.

== Personnel ==
Personnel adapted from Gabriel's website:

Musicians

- Peter Gabriel – piano, synthesizer, rhythm programming, lead and backing vocals
- Manu Katché – drums
- Tony Levin – bass
- David Rhodes – electric guitar
- Richard Evans – acoustic and electric guitar, mandolin
- Faye Dolle – rhythm programming, additional synthesizer, percussion
- Charles Hughes – percussion
- Ged Lynch – percussion

Technical

- Peter Gabriel – words and music, production
- Tchad Blake – mixing ("Dark-side" mix)
- Mark "Spike" Stent – mixing ("Bright-side" mix)
- Matt Colton – mastering
- Faye Dolle, Katie May, Dom Shaw, Richard Chappell, Ben Findlay – engineering
- Xav Sinden, Charles Hughes, Maisy Preece – assistant engineering
- Recorded at Real World Studios (Wiltshire), The Beehive (London)

Packaging

- Cover art – Ciclotrama 156 (Palindrome) by Janaina Mello Landini

== Charts ==
Chart performance for "Been Undone"
Chart (2026)	Peak position
UK Singles Sales (OCC)	31
