= Who Are We Talking To? =

Single by Peter Gabriel

from the album O\I
- Released: 26 October 2026
- Studio: Real World Studios (Wiltshire); The Beehive (London); Phantom Studios (Gallatin, Tennessee); Match Point Studios (New Orleans); SABC (Johannesburg)
- Length: 5:38 (Dark-Side Mix); 5:37 (Bright-Side Mix)
- Label: Real World
- Songwriter: Peter Gabriel
- Producer: Peter Gabriel

Peter Gabriel singles chronology
"Face the Wall" (2026)	"Who Are We Talking To?" (2026)

"Who Are We Talking To?" is a song by the English musician Peter Gabriel. Real World Records released "Who Are We Talking To" on 26 October 2026 as the eleventh single from Gabriel's upcoming 2026 studio album, O\I. A song with funk and soul references, Gabriel wrote "Who Are We Talking To?" with the intention of encouraging activism.

The song's Dark-Side mix was released to coincide with that month's full moon. Whereas every other Dark-Side mix from O\I was handled by Tchad Blake, Mike Elizondo did the Dark-Side mix for "Who Are We Talking To" instead. A Bright-Side mix of "Who Are We Talking To" will be released on the next new moon.

== Background ==
The working title for "Who Are We Talking To?" was "Radio Everyone". "Radio Everyone" had been previously released as a 14-second clip in 2015 as part of the Global Goals initiative by the United Nations that included the launch of an internet radio station called Radio Everyone.

"Who Are We Talking To?" was inspired by funk and soul music, specifically citing Marvin Gaye, Fela Kuti, and Curtis Mayfield as influences. Gabriel referred to the song as "a plea for activism", explaining that he intended for the song to spur collective action, with the hopes that people would view themselves as global citizens when addressing issues related to climate change, artificial intelligence, and pandemics.

For the instrumentation David Rhodes recorded what Gabriel called a "really nice funky pattern" on guitar. Leo Nocentelli recorded an additional guitar on the track, having previously worked with Gabriel on "Digging in the Dirt" and "Steam" on his 1992 Us album.

All of Gabriel's songs on I/O and O\I had featured two different mixes, a Bright-Side mix and a Dark-Side mix. Tchad Blake had done all of the Dark-Side mixes for these albums with the exception of "Who Are We Talking To?" due to a lack of availability. Gabriel asked Mike Elizondo to assist with the song's Dark-Side mix as he had been pleased with his contributions to some of the material on O\I. While Elizondo was working on "Who Are We Talking To?", he asked Gabriel for permission to record a bass part that he thought would work well with the song. Gabriel agreed to the idea and described Elizondo's bass part as "fatter and emptier than what Tony Levin might have done".

== Artwork ==
The single artwork for "Who Are We Talking To?" is a piece titled Bloques from the Spanish artist Juan Genovés. Gabriel recalled that he had encountered difficulties in finding a suitable piece of artwork to accompany "Who Are We Talking To?". He was specifically looking for artwork that evoked political action without referencing any specific movement. Gabriel decided that Bloques was compatible with these parameters, saying that "like many of the images across the album, it beautifully illustrates some of the ideas within the music. His thoughts on political oppression and resistance show lots of little people standing against these big geometric environments." When interpreting the title of the art, Gabriel envisioned "big physical blocks within the painting that seem to represent the barriers that divide people and make it harder for them to come together", which he felt was relevant to the song's subject matter.

== Personnel ==
- Peter Gabriel – vocals, synths, rhythm programming, percussion
- David Rhodes – electric guitar
- Leo Nocentelli – electric guitar
- Katie May – electric guitar
- Tony Levin – bass
- Mike Elizondo – bass, synths, rhythm programming
- Abe Rounds – drums, percussion
- Josh Shpak – trumpet, trombone
- Evan Smith – saxophone
- Soweto Gospel Choir – choir vocals
