= Put the Bucket Down =

Single by Peter Gabriel

from the album O\I
- Released: 1 February 2026
- Studio: Real World (Wiltshire); The Beehive (London); British Grove (London); Fonoprint (Bologna)
- Length: 6:47 (Bright-Side mix); 6:56 (Dark-Side mix)
- Label: Real World
- Songwriter: Peter Gabriel
- Producer: Peter Gabriel

Peter Gabriel singles chronology
"Been Undone" (2026)	"Put the Bucket Down" (2026)	"What Lies Ahead" (2026)

"Put the Bucket Down" is a song by English musician Peter Gabriel. It was released on 1 February 2026 through Real World Records. The song was produced by Gabriel and is the second single from his upcoming eleventh studio album O\I (2026). The song's "Bright-Side mix" (done by Mark "Spike" Stent) was released first, with the "Dark-Side mix" (by Tchad Blake) following on 17 February.

== Background ==
"Put The Bucket Down" was first written in February 2019 and further developed during the I/O sessions, although left off the album. Gabriel constructed "Put the Bucket Down" around what he described as a "lop-sided loop". After the conclusion of the band sessions, Gabriel asked John Metcalfe to create an orchestral motif, which was "scribbled out on the day in the studio." Included on the song are Paolo Fresu and Josh Shpak on brass instruments, the latter of whom also toured with Gabriel on his I/O The Tour.

On the subject of the song, Gabriel stated: "The 'bucket' is all the crap that goes around our head all the time, so it is putting the bucket down to find your way forward". The cover art for the single features Cosmic Spider/Web by Argentine artist Tomás Saraceno. Cyrtophora citricola, Nephila senegalensis, and Holocnemus pluchei spiders were used to create the artwork, and are also credited with its authorship.

Gabriel mentioned in a press release statement coinciding with the release of "Put the Bucket Down" that he intended for the song to be part of a side project centered around the brain, an idea that was spurred after a meeting with Mary Lou Jepsen. He commented that he "became very fascinated with the idea of the brain / computer interface and what consequences that might bring to the world. This is one of the reasons that the brain show came up..."

== Personnel ==
Adapted from Gabriel's website:

Musicians

- Peter Gabriel – lead and backing vocals, piano, synthesizer, keyboard bass, rhythm programming
- Tony Levin – bass
- David Rhodes – electric guitar, backing vocals
- Katie May – acoustic guitar
- Paolo Fresu – trumpet (Note: Bright-Side mix only)
- Josh Shpak – trumpet, French horn
- Brian Eno – rhythm programming
- Oli Jacobs – rhythm programming
- Richard Chappell – rhythm programming
- Ríognach Connolly – backing vocals
- Melanie Gabriel – backing vocals

New Blood Orchestra

- violin – Everton Nelson, Richard George, Natalia Bonner, Cathy Thompson, Debbie Widdup, Odile Ollagnon, Ian Humphries, Louisa Fuller, Martin Burgess, Clare Hayes, Charles Mutter, Marianne Hayne
- viola – Bruce White, Rachel Roberts, Fiona Bonds, Peter Lale
- flute – Eliza Marshall
- cello – Ian Burdge, Caroline Dale, Tony Woollard, Chris Worsey, William Schofield, Chris Allen
- double bass – Chris Laurence, Lucy Shaw, Stacey Watton
- orchestral arrangement by John Metcalfe with Peter Gabriel
- conducting – John Metcalfe

== Charts ==
Chart performance for "Put the Bucket Down"
Chart (2026)	Peak position
UK Singles Sales (OCC)	95
