= One by One (Peter Gabriel song) =

Single by Peter Gabriel

from the album O\I
- Released: 29 July 2026
- Studio: Real World Studios (Wiltshire); The Beehive (London); Phantom Studios (Gallatin, Tennessee)
- Length: 9:37 (Bright-Side Mix); 9:29 (Dark-Side Mix)
- Label: Real World
- Songwriter: Peter Gabriel
- Producer: Peter Gabriel

Peter Gabriel singles chronology
"I Belong to the Sky" (2026)	"One by One" (2026)	"Looking for the Happy" (2026)

"One by One" is a song by English musician Peter Gabriel that was released on 29 July 2026 through Real World Records. The song was written and produced by Gabriel and is the eighth single from his upcoming eleventh studio album O\I (2026).

Gabriel wrote "One by One" as part of an upcoming brain project, with the narrative centering around "Mozo", a reoccurring character that has appeared across some of Gabriel's albums. Similar to the other songs on O\I, "One by One" received several mixes, with the "Bright-Side mix" (done by Mark "Spike" Stent) being released first to coincide with the full moon in July. The Dark-Side mix, done by Tchad Blake, was released during the new moon.

== Background ==
"One by One" is centered around Mozo, a fictional character created by Gabriel that became the focus of certain songs in Gabriel's discography, beginning with "Down the Dolce Vita" and "Here Comes the Flood" from his 1977 debut album, Peter Gabriel. The following year, "On the Air" became the first time that Gabriel explicitly mentioned Mozo in his lyrics. Gabriel's conceived the idea of Mozo in early 1976 after reading the alchemical treatise Aurora Consurgens and intended to have a series of songs related to Mozo that would culminate in a complete story.

Up until "One by One", the last songs to center around Mozo were "Red Rain" and "That Voice Again" from Gabriel's 1986 album, So. Gabriel had intended to use Mozo in some of his other works, having considered the idea of collaborating with the Czech animator Radúz Činčera in the late 1970s. This idea failed to come to fruition, as did Gabriel's idea of turning Mozo's story into a one-hour video. When looking for a character for his brain project, Gabriel decided to revive the character as he had "always wanted to do a little more with Mozo." He felt that the references to alchemy in Mozo's narrative connected well to "One by One's" themes of "trying to reassemble self, psyche and sanity."

Discussing the song's length, which is nearly ten minutes long, Gabriel said that "One by One" was amongst the two or three story songs on O\I. He defended the song's run-time, saying that "some people will find this interminably long, but I actually like the length and I like the fact you have to stay in it for a long time to feel the story." Gabriel likened the listening experience to someone acclimating themselves to a hut in the woods, where it "takes a while just to settle in and get yourself tuned-in to the pace of that place."

Musically, the song is built around a triplet motif on the piano, which was augmented by what Gabriel described as "tinkly sounds". He likened these sounds to what Brian Eno had done on Gabriel's "Four Kinds of Horses" in terms of creating the impression of a "moving wallpaper" of sound and expressed interest in taking the same approach for the Atmos mix of "One by One". Gabriel felt that the chord progression was fairly typical, saying that "everyone has written a song around these chords", but that he was "trying to do something a bit different with them." He accomplished this by beginning the composition with the piano figure and opening it up to richer textures with "ghost-like chords" and an "evolving drone background". The song also features some flute playing, which Gabriel confirmed was not from him, saying that he was "one of the world's worst flute players", but that he was still drawn to the instrument's "breathy sounds".

== Artwork ==
The single artwork for "One By One" was created by the Canadian sculptor David Altmejd. Gabriel asked Altmejd to create the artwork for "One by One" after seeing his 2022 piece "9x9X9". Gabriel said that he found Altmejd's approach of reassembling images appealing, saying that they resembled "an old-fashioned flick book where you get just an incremental movement from one image to the other." Altmejd characterised the artwork as "a kind of spiritual evolution by piecing together the broken parts of oneself."

== Personnel ==
- Peter Gabriel – vocals, piano, synths, rideout bass, rhythm programming
- David Rhodes – electric guitar, acoustic guitar
- Katie May – acoustic guitar
- Tony Levin – bass
- Manu Katché – drums
- Abe Rounds – percussion
- Mike Elizondo – rhythm programming
- Charles Hughes – rhythm programming
- Josh Shpak – flugelhorn, French horn
- Evan Smith – flute, saxophone
