= Till Your Mind Is Shining =

Single by Peter Gabriel

from the album O\I
- Released: 2 April 2026
- Studio: Real World (Wiltshire); The Beehive (London)
- Length: 5:09 (Dark-Side Mix); 5:07 (Bright-Side Mix)
- Label: Real World
- Songwriter: Peter Gabriel
- Producer: Peter Gabriel

Peter Gabriel singles chronology
"What Lies Ahead" (2026)	"Till Your Mind Is Shining" (2026)	"Won't Stand Down" (2026)

"Till Your Mind Is Shining" is a song by English musician Peter Gabriel. It was released on 2 April 2026 through Real World Records. The song was produced by Gabriel and is the fourth single from his upcoming eleventh studio album O\I (2026). The song's "Dark-Side mix" (done by Tchad Blake) was released first to coincide with the Pink Moon.

== Background ==
"Till Your Mind Is Shining" is a song which was a leftover from the I/O project, dating to around 2019. Gabriel began the song with a chord progression that he felt was "poppy and playful". Some of the ideas, which had dated back a few years prior to the single's release, were then refined further and later presented to the band. When working on the lyrics, Gabriel sought to explore themes of sentience in plants and animals and the origination of consciousness.

In some ways it's about opening up the mind and stepping inside to understand a little more of ourselves and the world we live in with the hope that we respond a little more responsibly and compassionately.

In a press release, Gabriel was complimentary of his band's playing, saying that they contributed "wonderful performances". Gabriel was also pleased with his vocals, particularly near the end of the song. He described "Till Your Mind is Shining" as the "closest I get to a pop song on this record". Gabriel specifically likened it to his approach to writing pop songs during his time with the band Genesis, which had initially intended to operate as a songwriter's collective.

When determining the single artwork for "Till Your Mind is Shining", Gabriel sought something that "felt like a mixture of something cold and structured and informative as well as being soft and self-reflective". He ultimately selected the piece Warp Time with Warp Self, No. 2 by Tatsuo Miyajima as the single art. The artwork features a series of numbers imposed over a warped figure in the background, which Gabriel said represented "the human and the mechanical AI world that we're creating."

== Personnel ==
Adapted from Gabriel's website:

Musicians

- Peter Gabriel – lead and backing vocals, piano, synths, rhythm programming
- David Rhodes – electric guitar, backing vocals
- Katie May – acoustic guitar, additional synth
- Richard Evans – 12-string guitar, mandolin
- Tony Levin – bass
- Manu Katché – drums
- Oli Jacobs – drums, rhythm programming
- Mike Elizondo – rhythm programming
- Faye Dolle – rhythm programming
- Richard Chappell – rhythm programming
