= A Hard Lesson =

Single by Peter Gabriel

from the album O\I
- Released: 31 May 2026
- Studio: Real World Studios (Wiltshire); The Beehive (London); Phantom Studios (Gallatin, Tennessee)
- Length: 6:41 (Bright-Side Mix); 6:42 (Dark-Side Mix)
- Label: Real World
- Songwriter: Peter Gabriel
- Producers: Peter Gabriel; Mike Elizondo

Peter Gabriel singles chronology
"Won't Stand Down" (2026)	"A Hard Lesson" (2026)	"I Belong to the Sky" (2026)

"A Hard Lesson" is a song by English musician Peter Gabriel that was released on 31 May 2026 through Real World Records. The song was co-produced by Gabriel and Mike Elizondo and is the sixth single from his upcoming eleventh studio album O\I (2026). Having been written between the late 1980s - early 1990s, "A Hard Lesson" is the oldest song that is set to appear on O\I. Similar to the other songs on O\I, "A Hard Lesson" received several mixes, with the "Bright-Side mix" (done by Mark "Spike" Stent) being released first to coincide with the blue moon in May. The Dark-Side mix, which was done by Tchad Blake, was released during the new moon.

== Background ==
"A Hard Lesson" was first developed in the late 1980s or early 1990s and properly recorded around 1996 under the title "Dakar 12" when Gabriel was spending time in Senegal. Gabriel commented that the song was "in the 'almost' category on a couple of earlier projects [including Up], but it's had to wait 30 or 40 years before actually hitting the surface" and that difficulties in finalizing the music had prevented the song from being completed sooner. Gabriel was inspired by the use of 3 against 4 polyrhythms that he was hearing during his time in Senegal and decided to incorporate these rhythms into the intro of "A Hard Lesson". He said that the song was about "trying to find a place, your place, how you fit in" and that he aimed to incorporate elements of rhythm and blues and folk music later on its development.

Gabriel had asked Charles Hughes to sort through cassettes of archived material, of which several tapes for "Dakar 12" were located. Hughes then tracked down the multi-track tapes for the song and added it to a list of potential contenders for O\I.

"A Hard Lesson" went through several iterations, including what Gabriel described as a more industrial version developed in 1998; some of these industrial components were retained in "A Hard Lesson". The song also went through different sets of lyrics and alternative approaches to the chorus. Gabriel commented that the updated version was "a much better song now than it ever has been". David Rhodes had played guitar on several versions of the song throughout its development, and Tony Berg, who had served as Gabriel's A&R representative at Geffen in America in the late 1980s and 1990s, also participated by adding what Gabriel described as a "backwards sounding" guitar part. For the song's chorus, which in its earlier stages was more electronic, Gabriel built the section around a harpsichord sample that was triggered on a synthesizer, which he said provided the section with a "folky character". Richard Evans then augmented the passages with various acoustic instruments such as the mandolin. The song's original riff for the verses was supplied by a guitar, which Gabriel thought rooted the song too deeply in the blues genre, so the instrument was replaced by a cello sound on a synthesizer.

Mike Elizondo worked on the song by making different splices to the track and adding a "fat bass" sound as described by Gabriel, who felt that his contributions warranted a co-production credit. Elizondo also brought in Abe Rounds to contribute some drums and percussion to the song.

== Artwork ==
The single artwork for "A Hard Lesson" is a still image that was taken from the film Cuentos Patrioticos. Francis Alÿs, who directed the film, had included a scene recreating a 1968 protest in Mexico City by civil servants who protested the new government by bleating like sheep. Alÿs reenacted the protest by walking around a pole situated in the same plaza as the protest, after which a group of sheep followed behind him as he circled around the pole. Gabriel called the scene "quirky and strange" and chose it as the single art because it "leapt out" at him.

== Personnel ==
- Peter Gabriel – lead and backing vocals, synthesizers, percussion, rhythm programming
- David Rhodes – electric guitar
- Tony Berg – electric guitar
- Richard Evans – twelve-string guitar, mandolin, banjo, synth bass, synthesizers
- Mike Elizondo – bass, rhythm programming
- Tony Levin – bass
- Manu Katché – drums
- Abe Rounds – drums, percussion
- Faye Dolle – percussion
- Charles Hughes – percussion
