= O\I =

Studio album by Peter Gabriel
- Released: 27 November 2026
- Recorded: October 1989 – December 2025
- Venue: Rexall Place (Edmonton)
- Studios: Real World (Wiltshire); The Beehive (London); British Grove (London); Phantom (Gallatin, Tennessee); Studio Saint Louis (Paris); Alfvénsalen (Uppsala); Fonoprint (Bologna); ArteSuono (Udine); SABC (Johannesburg); Match Point (New Orleans); Home studios of Tony Levin, Evan Smith, Josh Shpak, Ríoghnach Connolly and Melanie Gabriel (various parts of the world)
- Length: 80:43 (Bright-Side mix); 81:43 (Dark-Side mix)
- Label: Real World
- Producers: Peter Gabriel; Mike Elizondo

Peter Gabriel chronology
Live at WOMAD 1982 (2025)	O\I (2026)

Singles from O\I
- 1. "Been Undone" Released: 3 January 2026; 2. "Put the Bucket Down" Released: 1 February 2026; 3. "What Lies Ahead" Released: 3 March 2026; 4. "Till Your Mind Is Shining" Released: 2 April 2026; 5. "Won't Stand Down" Released: 1 May 2026; 6. "A Hard Lesson" Released: 31 May 2026; 7. "I Belong to the Sky" Released: 30 June 2026; 8. "One by One" Released: 29 July 2026; 9. "Looking for the Happy" Released: 28 August 2026; 10. "Face the Wall" Released: 26 September 2026; 11. "Who Are We Talking To?" Released: 26 October 2026

O\I (typeset as o\i) is the upcoming eleventh studio album (Note: Ninth album of original material excluding covers/re-recordings albums, soundtracks or other commissioned work) by English musician Peter Gabriel, expected to be released on 27 November 2026. Like its predecessor I/O (2023), each song on the album will receive both "Bright-Side" and "Dark-Side" mixes and will be released to correlate with each month's full moon and new moon, respectively. The "Bright-Side" mixes were created by Mark "Spike" Stent, while the "Dark-Side" mixes were handled by Tchad Blake (except "Who Are We Talking To?", which was handled by Mike Elizondo). O\I is his longest album to date, with both mixes clocking in at roughly 81 and 82 minutes respectively, and totaling close to three hours. It will also be Gabriel's first double studio album on CD, while the vinyl versions will come with two LPs.

The album will be available in its entirety once all tracks have been released individually throughout the year. On 1 October 2026, the release date for O\I was announced for 27 November 2026, along with the track listing and cover art, the latter of which was photographed by Nadav Kander.

In addition to new material recorded during 2024 and 2025, O\I collects previously unreleased tracks or outtakes from the sessions of Gabriel's previous three albums Us (1992), Up (2002) and I/O. The oldest song on the album is "A Hard Lesson", which dates back to the sessions of Us between 1989 and 1992. Ten of thirteen tracks from O\I have been released as singles, with two more slated before the album's release and one being released afterwards.

== Background ==
In an interview published in March 2023 with Uncut magazine, Gabriel mentioned that he had a surplus of material from his I/O album, which at the time was still being rolled out with song releases coinciding with the full moon. He expressed interest in continuing this practice beyond the final release date of I/O using his existing batch of 20 songs. Gabriel cited two of his songs that were used on film soundtracks as possible contenders for a follow-up album to I/O, specifically "The Veil" from Snowden (released on Flotsam and Jetsam in 2019) and "Why Don't You Show Yourself" from Words with Gods, although they both do not appear on the album.

In November 2023, Gabriel said that his song "What Lies Ahead" would also appear on the follow-up to I/O. Gabriel had performed "What Lies Ahead" on a few occasions for his I/O The Tour in 2023. One day prior to I/O's release, Gabriel told The New York Times that he did not expect a follow-up album (which he described as his "brain project") to take another 21 years, saying that "there's a lot of stuff in the can" but added that the material was not yet finished.

Gabriel announced the album title O\I in a February 2025 article published in Mojo. On 3 January 2026, "Been Undone" was released as the album's first single, corresponding with the wolf moon. He mentioned that some songs on the album would be part of a brain project, which he had been "exploring for a number of years." One of those songs was the album's second single, "Put the Bucket Down", which was released on 1 February 2026. Gabriel plans to release more songs from the album on days that correlate to the full moon. "One by One" is also part of the brain project and references a fictional character created by Gabriel named Mozo, whose narrative had been interspersed across several songs spanning from his 1977 self-titled debut album to So (1986). Gabriel said that "One by One" was among the "two or three story songs on the record".

Like I/O, each track on the album has received a Bright-Side and Dark-Side mix created by Mark "Spike" Stent and Tchad Blake, respectively. Discussing the nature of the different mixes, Gabriel commented that "people always think that the emotion all comes from the song, but actually you can change that enormously by the way you move things, dip them and bring them out, and isolate certain sounds and instruments – by the way you tell the story. It's very much a creative contribution with these wonderful mixers."

== Track listing ==
All tracks are written by Peter Gabriel.

Disc one
No.	Title	Length
1.	"Been Undone"	6:48
2.	"Put the Bucket Down"	6:56
3.	"What Lies Ahead"	2:52
4.	"Till Your Mind Is Shining"	5:09
5.	"Won't Stand Down"	6:07
6.	"Who Are We Talking To?"	5:37
7.	"Yes, It Will Go"	5:05
8.	"One by One"	9:37

Disc two
No.	Title	Length
1.	"A Hard Lesson"	6:42
2.	"Face the Wall"	4:47
3.	"I Belong to the Sky"	7:23
4.	"Looking for the Happy"	8:34
5.	"Sacrament"	5:05
