= I Belong to the Sky =

Single by Peter Gabriel

from the album O\I
- Released: 30 June 2026
- Studio: Real World Studios (Wiltshire); The Beehive (London)
- Length: 7:23 (Bright-Side Mix); 7:22 (Dark-Side Mix)
- Label: Real World
- Songwriter: Peter Gabriel
- Producer: Peter Gabriel

Peter Gabriel singles chronology
"A Hard Lesson" (2026)	"I Belong to the Sky" (2026)	"One by One" (2026)

"I Belong to the Sky" is a song by English musician Peter Gabriel that was released on 30 June 2026 through Real World Records. The song was written and produced by Gabriel and is the seventh single from his upcoming eleventh studio album O\I (2026).

Originally recorded and considered for Gabriel's previous studio album, i/o, "I Belong to the Sky" was reworked and completed for O\I. Similar to the other songs on O\I, "I Belong to the Sky" received several mixes, with the "Bright-Side mix" (done by Mark "Spike" Stent) being released first to coincide with the strawberry moon. The Dark-Side mix, created by Tchad Blake, will be released during the new moon. Rolling Stone characterised it as "a sprawling seven-plus–minute slow burn with burbling synths that recall deep cuts on Gabriel's all-digital Peter Gabriel (1982)".

== Background ==
"I Belong to the Sky" was in consideration for inclusion on Gabriel's 2023 i/o album, but the song was not completed in time for its release. Gabriel said that the song had "taken a while to grow" and had "always [been] one of my favourites".

The song began with a tom-tom pattern played on timpani mallets, which in turn was inspired by the drumming of Chico Hamilton from the film Jazz on a Summer's Day. Discussing the song, Gabriel said that "the verses have a more dreamlike 'on your back and look up at the sky' feeling and then in the chorus it’s about the execution, the materializing." He created an extended outro with the intention of allowing the band to open up with their playing, saying that "one of the things I love about this track is that these amazing musicians let themselves loose and really take off - with Manu (Katché) driving. It's just great."

The single artwork for "I Belong to the Sky", created by Berndnaut Smilde, is titled Nimbus de Toekomst 1, 2019 and includes a cloud in the interior of a building. Gabriel commented that the image represented the "mixture of outside and interior worlds" and that he was pleased that Smilde gave Gabriel permission to use Nimbus de Toekomst 1, 2019 as the official artwork for "I Belong to the Sky".

Gabriel said that Smilde had "talked about the clouds being able to represent different things, even happy things and that they could also be about dreams and provide a sense of the future", which Gabriel did not notice when he first saw the image. Gabriel concluded that Smilde "was thinking visually in very similar ways to how I was working with the lyric and the sound."

== Personnel ==
- Peter Gabriel – lead and backing vocals, piano, synths, rhythm programming
- Richard Chappell – rhythm programming
- David Rhodes – electric and acoustic guitars
- Katie May – electric and acoustic guitars
- Tony Levin – bass
- Brian Eno – additional synths
- Faye Dolle – additional synths, backing vocals
- Manu Katché – drums
- Evan Smith – saxophone, percussion, additional synths
- Melanie Gabriel – backing vocals
