= Won't Stand Down (Peter Gabriel song) =

Single by Peter Gabriel

from the album O\I
- Released: 1 May 2026
- Studio: Real World Studios (Wiltshire); The Beehive (London); Phantom Studios (Gallatin, Tennessee)
- Length: 6:07 (Bright-Side Mix and Dark-Side Mix)
- Label: Real World
- Songwriter: Peter Gabriel
- Producer: Peter Gabriel

Peter Gabriel singles chronology
"Till Your Mind Is Shining" (2026)	"Won't Stand Down" (2026)	"A Hard Lesson" (2026)

"Won't Stand Down" is a song by English musician Peter Gabriel. It was released on 1 May 2026 through Real World Records. It was produced by Gabriel and is the fifth single from his upcoming eleventh studio album O\I (2026). Similar to the other songs on O\I, "Won't Stand Down" received several mixes, with "Bright-Side mix" (done by Mark "Spike" Stent) being released first to coincide with the Flower Moon. The Dark-Side mix, (done by Tchad Blake) was released during the new moon. Gabriel described "Won't Stand Down" as a call for social activism.

== Background ==
"Won't Stand Down" was one of the more recent ideas developed for O/I, originating as a piano version recorded in February 2025 as "WSD". Gabriel had considered the idea of creating music for the Elders, a group that Gabriel initiated with Richard Branson. This group consisted of former leaders who were tasked with providing guidance and advice to resolve global conflicts. Some of the original members of the group included Nelson Mandela, Desmond Tutu, and Jimmy Carter. Gabriel said that he intended for "Won't Stand Down" to stimulate actions that lead to "basic values of justice, compassion and democracy". He wanted the song to be "up and positive even though the subject is quite difficult and dark."

When working on the music for "Won't Stand Down", Gabriel was drawn to the song "Sexual Healing" by Marvin Gaye, saying that there was a "Cuban element" that "allowed the rhythm to move". He wanted the song to have "real, live emotion in it", and felt that the musicianship of his backing band contributed to this. The song (like its predecessor Till Your Mind Is Shining) includes contributions from Mike Elizondo, who Gabriel had first worked with for the "Digging in the Dirt" re-recording with Sheryl Crow. Elizondo was also responsible for introducing Gabriel to Abe Rounds, who contributed some of the percussion to "Won't Stand Down".

The song's Bright-Side mix, created by Mark "Spike" Stent was released on 1 May 2026 to coincide with the Flower Moon. A Dark-Side mix from Tchad Blake is set to follow later in the month on the new moon. Gabriel mentioned that the two commissioned mixes from Stent and Blake showcased different instruments and said that their contributions resulted in "a real sense of emotion".

== Artwork ==
The single's artwork, titled Faith was created by Shirin Neshat and features two sets of hands. Included on the hands are inscriptions with a quote from a 13th century Sufi mystic that roughly translates to "give me a hand so I can be held." Gabriel found the artwork to be "very beautiful, powerful and political" that represented the protection of "a positive future for our kids." Gabriel provided further commentary on the use of Shirin's artwork in a press release.

By using Shirin’s work here people may ask whether this song is connected to what is happening now in Iran and although it wasn't written in reference to the bombing – It was written before that attack – I think it is a real condemnation of humanity that we have not found a way to settle disputes without bombing, destroying and murdering each other. We should be well beyond that by now.

== Critical reception ==
Chris DeVille of Stereogum referred to "Won't Stand Down" as an "inspirational political ballad". Writing for NME, Liberty Dunworth called the song "an uplifting, politically charged new single", adding that it "gradually builds towards the euphoric-yet-tranquil chorus."

== Personnel ==
- Peter Gabriel – lead vocals, piano, synthesisers, rhythm programming
- David Rhodes – acoustic and electric guitar
- Tony Levin – bass
- Manu Katché – drums
- Abe Rounds – additional drums, percussion
- Mike Elizondo – rhythm programming
- Faye Dolle – backing vocals
