= What Lies Ahead (song) =

Single by Peter Gabriel

from the album O\I
- Released: 3 March 2026
- Studio: Real World (Wiltshire); The Beehive (London); British Grove (London); Alfvénsalen (Uppsala); ArteSuono (Udine)
- Venue: Rexall Place (Edmonton)
- Length: 2:52 (Bright-Side Mix); 2:54 (Dark-Side Mix)
- Label: Real World
- Songwriter: Peter Gabriel
- Producer: Peter Gabriel

Peter Gabriel singles chronology
"Put the Bucket Down" (2026)	"What Lies Ahead" (2026)	"Till Your Mind Is Shining" (2026)

"What Lies Ahead" is a song by English musician Peter Gabriel. It was released on 3 March 2026 through Real World Records as the third single from his forthcoming O\I album. Similar to other songs on the album, the song was released to coincide with the full moon, in this case the Worm Moon. Prior to its release as a single, Gabriel had previously performed "What Lies Ahead" live, including his Back to Front Tour and I/O The Tour.

== Background ==
Similar to his song "Playing for Time", Gabriel debuted "What Lies Ahead" without full lyrics on his Back to Front Tour. He first performed the song during his 20 November 2014 performance in Turin, Italy during the acoustic portion and played the song again the following evening in the city of Bologna. The song's arrangement consisted of piano and strings during this tour, with Rolling Stone describing it as a "reflective new piano ballad". A live recording of this song was later included on a few of Gabriel's Back to Front - Encore Series CDs.

Gabriel included "What Lies Ahead" in the setlist of his 2023 I/O The Tour on six occasions, including the opening night of the tour in Kraków, Poland. After performing the song a total of three times in Europe during this tour, he added the song back into the setlist for three North American dates, including the final show of the tour, which took place in Houston, Texas at the Toyota Center. During these performances, Gabriel dedicated the song to his deceased father.

== Composition and recording ==
Gabriel developed "What Lies Ahead" around a melody that his son Isaac had created. When he performed "What Lies Ahead" during his Back to Front Tour, the song still lacked finalised lyrics. Gabriel mentioned that "What Lies Ahead" involved the efforts of several Scandinavian musicians, including Linnea Olsson, who played cello during live renditions of the song during the Back to Front Tour. Olsson was asked by Gabriel to participate on the studio recording due to his fondness of Olsson's cello part. Further orchestral elements were added in 2022, which were arranged by John Metcalfe. "What Lies Ahead" also features contributions from Paolo Fresu, who had recorded and released his own rendition with Omar Sosa in 2020.

At the recommendation of Brian Eno, the song opens with the sound of a choir, which was created by the Scandinavian male voice choir Orphei Drängar, who had also appeared on Gabriel's song "This Is Home". Gabriel felt that the additions of Orphei Drängar created "a very strange mood" that was "powerful and emotional".

I've always liked spiritual, inspirational music because sometimes people get to a different place when they remove themselves and are just present with this feeling of something else out there. Although I'm not religious myself, I definitely have the feeling for it and that's what I was hoping we would have with the choir at the front, that you go straight away into this other world.

Gabriel wrote "What Lies Ahead" about his father, who was an inventor and electrical engineer, saying that he "saw him go through the frustrations of not only trying to realise an idea, which has to normally go through so many iterations, but then to sell it...". Gabriel further mentioned that he had a level of curiosity on the creative process of inventors, which he sought to encapsulate in "What Lies Ahead".

== Artwork ==
The single was accompanied by artwork created by Judy Chicago titled Birth Tear / Tear, which was created in 1982 and later embroidered by Jane Thompson in Houston, Texas. Gabriel commented that the artwork demonstrated the "pain of birth" and that the concept of "giving birth to an idea" carried other connotations.

== Personnel ==
- Peter Gabriel – vocals
- Tony Levin – bass
- Paolo Fresu – trumpet
- Linnea Olsson – solo cello

Orchestra and choir

- Violin – Everton Nelson, Richard George, Natalia Bonner, Cathy Thompson, Debbie Widdup, Odile Ollagnon, Ian Humphries, Louisa Fuller, Martin Burgess, Clare Hayes, Charles Mutter, Marianne Hayne
- Viola – Bruce White, Rachel Roberts, Fiona Bonds, Peter Lale
- Cello – Ian Burdge, Caroline Dale, Tony Woollard, Chris Worsey, William Schofield, Chris Allan
- Double bass – Chris Laurence, Lucy Shaw, Stacey Watton
- Choir – Orphei Drängar
- Orchestral arrangement by John Metcalfe, with Peter Gabriel
- Conducted by John Metcalfe
- Choir arrangement by Dom Shaw, with Peter Gabriel and Cecilia Rydinger
- Choir direction by Cecilia Rydinger
