= Won't Stand Down =

Won't Stand Down may refer to:

- Won't Stand Down (Muse song), 2022
- Won't Stand Down (Peter Gabriel song), 2026
