= Flávia Junqueira =

Brazilian artist and photographer (born 1985)

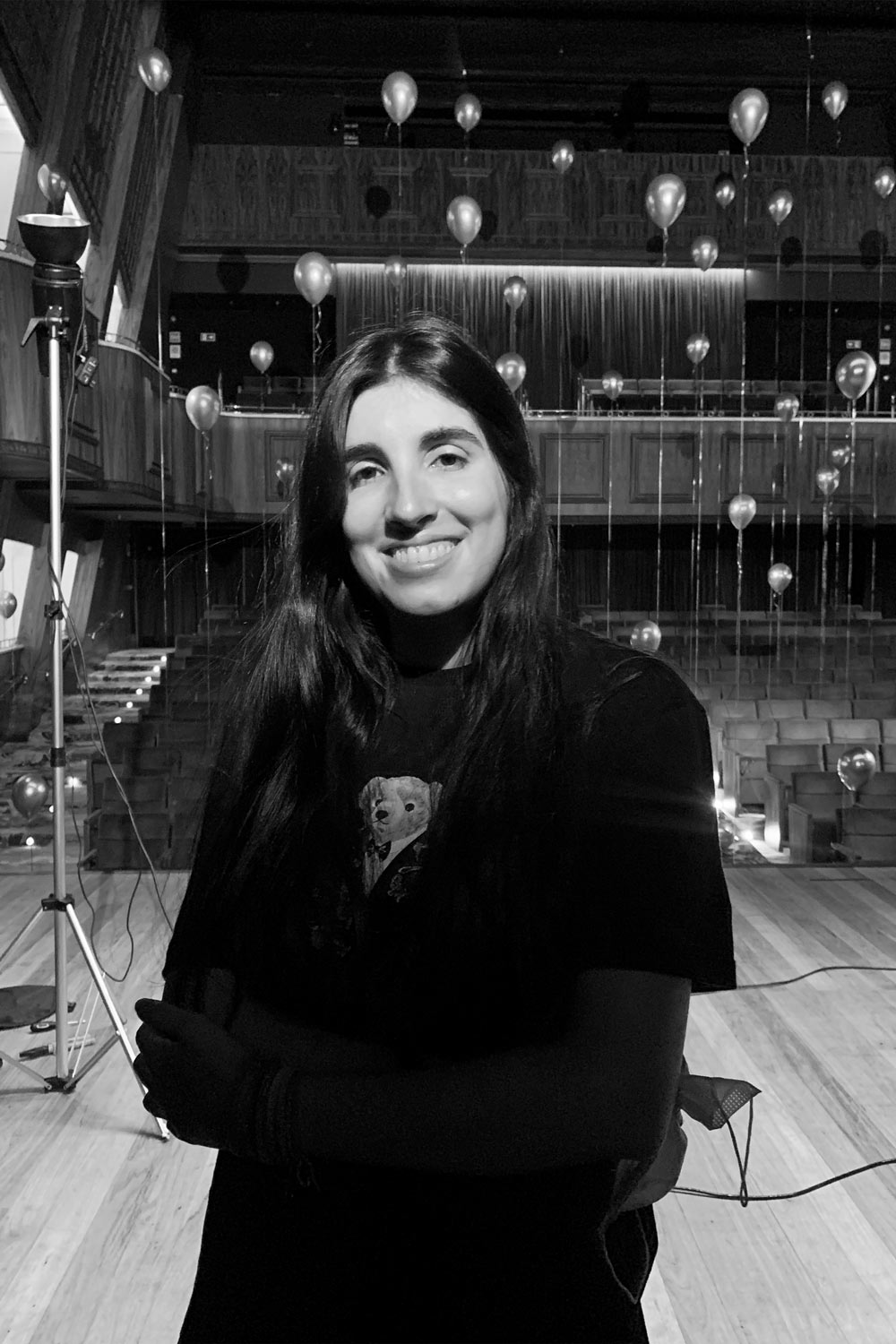
- Born: 15 February 1985 (age 41); São Paulo, Brazil
- Occupation: artist

Flávia Junqueira (born February 15, 1985) is a Brazilian visual artist.

== Life and education ==
Junqueira began her involvement with art as a child. At the age of 13, she enrolled in complementary courses at the Pan American School of Arts and Design in São Paulo. In 2004, she started her undergraduate studies in Photography, concurrently pursuing a bachelor's degree in Fine Arts at Fundação Armando Alvares Penteado (FAAP). During her studies, she worked as an assistant to set designer and architect José Carlos Serroni. Her thesis project, "To Know My Secrets," was supervised by professor Ronaldo Entler.

== Career ==
In her early works, the artist created settings filled with an excess of objects. Her series A House Party, exhibited at the opening of Zipper Gallery in 2010, explored the irony of childhood innocence through performative acts by the artist herself and memories associated with objects. That same year, Junqueira was invited to participate in the Red Bull House of Art artist residency in São Paulo.

In 2011, Junqueira shifted her focus to external spaces outside the intimate environment of the home, exploring old and decaying buildings in São Paulo. This led to her series Dreaming of a House within the House. As her career blossomed, she embarked on an artist residency at Cité Des Arts in Paris. where she cataloged the carousels of the city, resulting in the series Another Map for Paris. Continuing her journey in Europe, she traveled to Donetsk in Ukraine to participate in an artist residency guided by curator and artist Boris Mikhailov. In the exhibition Partly Cloud she used the abandonment of a Soviet cultural palace to reflect on the sentimental paradox accompanying the passage of time.

When she returned to Brazil, her style consolidated into staged photography. Influenced by José Carlos Serroni, she explored the relationships between art, scenography, and photography in her works. Throughout her research, her work incorporated influences from artists like Sophie Calle, Andy Warhol, and Jeff Koons, as well as fashion photographers such as David La Chapelle, and the photographic styles of Jeff Wall and Gregory Crewdson, who merge cinema with photography, alongside Cindy Sherman, a pioneer of staged photography.

In 2012, she presented Project for Happy Endings at the season of projects at Paço das Artes in Rio de Janeiro, Junqueira presented happy endings collected from children's books, seeking to erase the entire story and leaving only the reason why the character found happiness.

In Study for Inversion (2013) and The Path I Took Until I Found You (2011/2014), Junqueira explored the mechanisms of carousels and their function as part of leisure rituals. They also appeared as geographic indicators on maps of Paris and Buenos Aires, establishing new cartographic signals. Her intention was to expose fissures in spaces—be they childlike, melancholic, or festive—amidst everyday life, aiming to tension and manipulate reality.

In When Monsters Grow Old (2016), the artist moved away from the chaotic composition of her previous works, gathering the objects that accompanied her and displaying them isolated and dismembered from piles of balloons and toys. The monsters no longer frightened her as much and were even satirized. Junqueira presented functional spaces intended for adults, simulating children's parties to alleviate childish fears. That same year, she completed her master's degree in Visual Arts at the University of São Paulo (USP), with a thesis on The Theatricality of Everyday Life under the guidance of Mario Celso Ramiro de Andrade.

From 2017 onwards, balloons became recurrent and central elements in her work. Influenced by the circular element of Yayoi Kusama, Junqueira embarked on a new phase of staged photography, incorporating architectural heritage and historical elements. The exhibition Absurdity and Grace (2019) featured balloons floating amidst empty theaters, fragile elements within an enduring space.

In the series of installations Flocks, comprising balloon sculptures made of blown glass or resin suspended from the ceiling, Junqueira created a playful atmosphere within the space. The analogy between the breath that inflates the balloons and the one that shapes the glass sculpture adds another layer of lyricism to her art.

In 2021, amid the pandemic, Junqueira included party balloons in the empty samba school venues of Rio de Janeiro, producing her own documentary. That same year, she completed her Ph.D. at the State University of Campinas (UNICAMP) with a thesis on Flock: Constructing Enchantment through Reflection on Staged Photography, supervised by Ernesto Giovanni Boccara.
