= Zipper Gallery =

Art gallery in São Paulo, Brazil

Zipper Gallery is an art gallery founded by Fabio Cimino on September 11, 2010, in São Paulo, Brazil.

== History ==
The gallery's foundation mission was to gather the work of emerging artists from the Brazilian and Latin American scenes, focusing on opening new discussions in contemporary art. Its inaugural exhibition was held in 2010, featuring The House Party by artist Flávia Junqueira.

The gallery launched projects such as Zip'Up in 2011 and the Hall of Artists without Galleries held at Zipper since 2012, both aimed at promoting the work of visual artists who did not yet have representation in São Paulo's art galleries. In 2013, Lucas Cimino became a partner at the gallery, joining Fábio Cimino in executive direction. That same year, Zipper was recognized as one of the best galleries of the year in Brazil, The Best of 2013 special by Guia from the newspaper Folha de S.Paulo. In 2020, Osmar Santos became a partner at the gallery.

Artists such as Janaina Mello Landini, Flávia Junqueira, Adriana Duque, Fernando Velázquez, Gustavo Rezende, Camille Kachani, Hildebrando de Castro, Mario Ramiro and Graciela Sacco have exhibited at the gallery throughout its history.

In terms of sustainability, the gallery is a member of Gallery Climate Coalition, generating energy through solar power and partnering in reforestation efforts with SOS Mata Atlântica. In the area of technology, in 2021, Zipper became one of the first galleries in Brazil to sell NFTs of artworks. That same year, it launched Zipper Open, a project focused on the secondary art market.
