= Janaina Mello Landini =

- Born: September 20, 1974 (age 51); São Gotardo, Minas Gerais, Brazil
- Occupation: Artist

Janaina Mello Landini (September 20, 1974) is a Brazilian contemporary visual artist.

The artist's work begins with the semiotic apprehension of natural forces and human behavior to reflect on the complexity of the singular and the individual, creating a language that incorporates notions around the relationship between frequency, rhythm, and time, showing the infinite interconnection of individual trajectories within a system, society, or our planet. Her works cross different scales, from the object to public spaces.

Her works were exhibited in Brazil, France, the Netherlands, United States, and the United Arab Emirates. Her work is part of private and institutional collections such as the Museu de Arte do Rio, Fondation Carmignac, BIC Collection in France, and the Facebook headquarters in Menlo Park. Her major exhibitions have been held at Palais de Tokyo in Paris, Chaumont-sur-Loire Castle, the 13th edition of the Mercosul Biennial and at Zipper Gallery.

== Career ==
Janaina de Mello Castro Landini was born in São Gotardo, Minas Gerais, Brazil. She graduated in architecture in 1999 and studied Fine Arts from 2004 to 2007, both at the Federal University of Minas Gerais. In Belo Horizonte, she worked as an architect for ten years, creating scenographies and costumes for theater productions and advertising films between 2003 and 2006. In 2010, Janaina worked as art director for the feature film Blue Desert by Eder Santos. She then coordinated the artistic productions at Inhotim Institute and became product designer director for the institute's store.In 2013, she moved to São Paulo to dedicate herself exclusively to her art.

In 2010, Janaina began her experimentation with drawing in four-dimensional space using physical tension, twisting threads, nails, and knots to explore themes of interconnectedness and interdependence.Over canvas, her drawings transform into a blend of painting, sculpture, and embroidery. Cycleweb is the artist's neologism referring to the construction of a schematic, fractal, binary structure that tends towards infinite potential.

Cyclowebbing is a long-term ongoing action that involves dividing the whole and its parts, similar to mereology, establishing a relationship with craft practices by continuously unraveling a rope into two groups until its indivisible unit becomes apparent and supports the entire system. Cyclowebs are conceived from a linguistic perspective, a tool in the artist's repertoire for the exercise of hermeneutics, weaving together different formal, epistemological, ontological, and metaphysical conceptions into a more relativistic, autonomous, and poetic understanding evoked by these forms.

The first Cycloweb in the Impregnation series represented analytical thinking about concepts of infinitesimal calculus using the form of binary trees, where the individuation of each thread of a rope can be visible within a larger set. The Agglomeration series emerged from images brought by J.M. Bourgery and N.H. Jacob's atlas of human anatomy and surgery, where organ anatomy reveals that veins are structures similar to Ciclotramas, directly linked to hydrodynamics as revealed by Leonardo da Vinci when attempting to draw trees, with blood as a fluid, like water in rivers and plant and mycelium sap. Overlaps of weaves creating a structure closer to rhizome.

In the Palindrome series, whose ends were both "cyclewebbed", the cyclical reading between string versus rope versus string is formalized, bringing a hermetic bias, where all strings on one side are also on the other side of the string. The Mother Nature series highlights the palindrome. Referencing haplogroups or the genealogical tree, these Cycloweb question a scale that surpasses the individual life cycle, but at the same time composes it.

In the Expansion series, cords of different constitutions resting on the ground rise toward the screen made of sailing and embroidered with compass roses, reference to Portulano navigation charts, defining each of the cords its own cartographic projections as a reference to this new solipsist way of being in the world through the internet networks. In the Superstrate series, thick and biomorphic layers are engendered from threads of diverse types and configured into complex bodies.

In the Clusters series, the empty margins of the canvases suggest the idea of representing a larger piece of something and introduce the concept of order relation between different individuals. In the Immanence series, the conceptual vision of the plane of immanence by Deleuze and Guattari guides research. The idea of the singularity of "a life" brought by the authors, makes sense in the colored body of one of the plots among so many other monochrome plots that extend beyond the edges of the screen.

The series of Dialogues occur through conceptual affinity. The geometric progression of the plot threads has been replaced by the Fibonacci sequence in dialogue with the mathematician Leonardo Fibonacci. The approach to the research of the neuroscientist Santiago Ramon y Cajal also prompted a dialogue on the configuration of brain neurons.This systemic thinking is the essence of the affective field of a Cycloweb. Ultimately, it is not about representing metaphors, but about creating an abstract system of these themes and equivalent phenomena.

=== Labyrinths ===
In 2009, the Labyrinths series began, which remained complementary to the research on Cyclowebs. While Cyclowebs are thought out in a calculated and interdependent way and the result appears biomorphic, Labyrinths are conceived fluidly and rhizomatically, as their perspectives are impossible to exist in reality; therefore, their result is Cartesian.

The artist started the exercise of inventing a perspective inspired by a memory palace; the journey begins from a real place in the world, like a city block or an apartment. In a mental movement of depth searching, the known space is recorded, adding what is seen at each corner or node, in this case disregarding details, focusing only on the layout of non-built spaces, negative spaces, or even permeable spaces of possibilities to come and go. Consequently, the pathways are schematically formed through elements related to built, impermeable spaces or positive spaces, as described in Marc Augé's book, Non-Places, and referencing the concept created by Christopher Alexander.

The canvas presents the viewer with a central perspective that converges to a centrality but not to a vanishing point, where several observation points are simultaneously presented in a single line of sight. This unveiled labyrinth allows the viewer's gaze to enter and exit through the pathways, being able to be in all places at once. These are called Rhizomatic Labyrinths.

To create these paintings, the artist uses satin ribbons of different colors and widths, tensioned and fixed to the edge of the canvas. The designs are produced by crossing the ribbons over and under the surface like a weave; finally, the ribbons receive a charcoal-based darkening layer to reduce shine and reveal the underlying pattern. The satin used on the canvases acts as a refining element: the material reflects light according to the viewer's position; as the viewer moves, the incidence of light alters the corridors created by the perspective. In 2016, the artist presented the series Sinotropic Labyrinths at Zipper GalleryUsing nails and elastic threads, she created a special set of works on satin, based on her research on Rhizomatic Labyrinths.

=== Confined Space ===
In Confined Space, the artist revived one of her installations from the Ludic Spaces or Labyrinths of Evil series conceived in the early 2000s. These installations focused on creating a space that activates an affective relationship through the connection between the individual and the environment. Confined Space was the only one from the series already constructed. The first version took place in 2011 at the Palácio das Artes in Belo Horizonte, at the Eletrônica Festival.In 2022, the installation was presented at Zipper Gallery in São Paulo and also at the 13th edition of the Mercosul Biennial in Porto Alegre.

The artist's installation allowed visitors to walk through a room with a clearly visible entrance and exit. However, the interior was intersected by a sequence of "force groups," conceptually constructed structures of elastic bands that repeat and accumulate in space, creating a chaotic appearance.

As the body advances through this tangle, the elastic bands deform and resonate in space, creating new layers of experience. The sound that arises from the vibration of the elastics is one of the fundamental aspects of the work. Percussionist Paulo Santos created a musical composition with varying durations in 16 channels distributed in sensors that activate and combine through the body's movement, like a sound trail that can transition from the most harmonious state to a cacophonic state, but always randomly.
