= Tchad Blake =

American producer and audio engineer (born 1955)

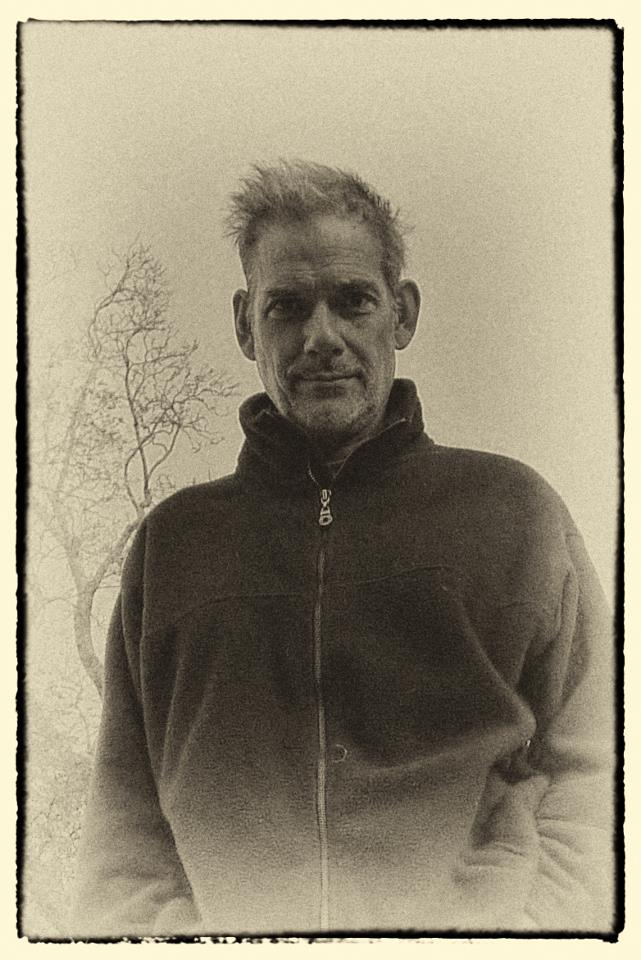
- Blake in 2011

Background information
- Born: 1955 (age 70–71); Baytown, Texas, US
- Origin: Los Angeles, California, US
- Occupations: Record producer; audio engineer; mixer; musician
- Years active: 1980-present
- Website: www.fullmongrel.com

Tchad Blake (born 1955) is an American record producer, audio engineer, mixer and musician.

== Early life ==
Tchad Blake was born in 1955 in Baytown, Texas, a suburb of Houston. Blake would spend both his childhood and adolescent years in Baytown and Los Angeles, California.

== Career ==
As of 2026, he has worked with many notable artists and musicians including Al Green, Arctic Monkeys, Elvis Costello, Fiona Apple, Gerard Way, Halloween, Jed Davis, Marike Jager, Pearl Jam, Peter Gabriel, Phantom Planet, Phish, Richard Thompson, Sam Phillips, Sheryl Crow, Soul Coughing, The Bangles, The Black Keys, The Dandy Warhols, The Pretenders, Tom Waits, Tracy Chapman, and U2, among other artists.

Blake often partners with Mitchell Froom, and the two formed Latin Playboys with David Hidalgo and Louie Pérez of Los Lobos.

Blake is known for his use of binaural recording, an experimental recording technique which employs two microphones to create a 3-D stereophonic sound. Blake brought a binaural microphone — a device resembling a human head with microphones positioned at the ears — into the sessions for Pearl Jam's Binaural (2000); the album was named for the technique, and Blake's binaural recording is most audible on the track "Soon Forget".

He has won a number of Grammy Awards, beginning with Best Engineered Album, Non-Classical and Best Rock Album for Sheryl Crow's The Globe Sessions (1998). He won another Grammy for Best Engineered Album, Non-Classical for his work on Suzanne Vega's Beauty & Crime (2007). Blake won two Grammys for his work with The Black Keys on 2010's Brothers.

In 2009 Blake took part in a guest lecture in the Department of Music and Audio at the University of Kent.

== Personal life ==
Blake currently resides in Powys, Wales.
