= The Bakery (recording studio) =

Recording studio in London

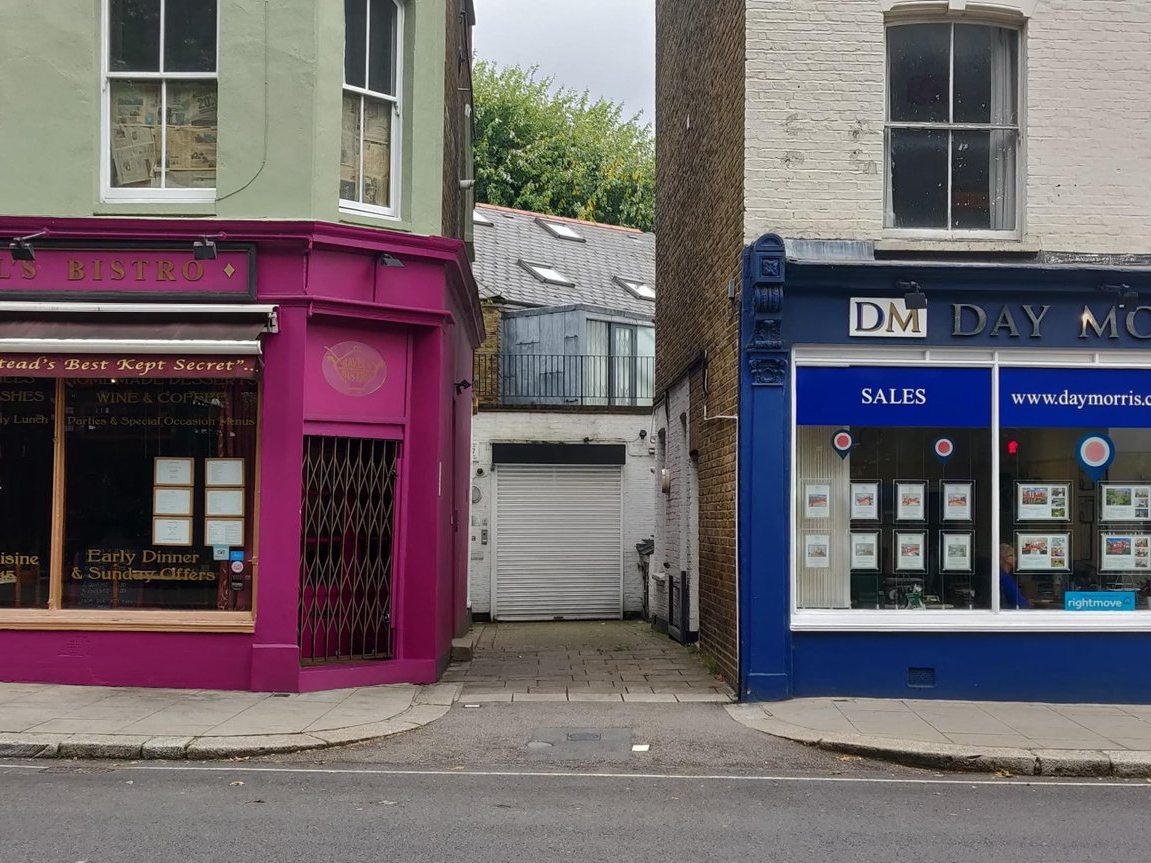
- Main entrance of the Bakery in white
- Interactive map of the Bakery
- Address: 4A Fleet Road, Hampstead
- Location: London, England
- Coordinates: 51°33′11.437″N 0°9′31.011″W
- Type: Recording studio
- Public transit: Hampstead Heath; Gospel Oak

Construction
- Opened: 2006; 20 years ago
- Closed: 2024; 2 years ago

The Bakery was a recording studio located at 4A Fleet Road, Hampstead, London, England. It was established in 2006 by British rock band Coldplay to provide a space where they could rehearse, write, work and rest after releasing X&Y (2005). The name of the studio was derived from being housed inside an old bakery. Its foundation matched Phil Harvey's return to the group for Viva la Vida or Death and All His Friends (2008). The Beehive, a sister building at 17 Fleet Road, was created four years later. Coldplay used both facilities on subsequent albums, until closing the Bakery and renovating the Beehive in the 2020s.

== Foundation ==
After the release of X&Y (2005), Coldplay decided to build their own recording studio. Chris Martin commented their former workplace felt dirty, bleak and the band were not properly talking to each other. They rented an old bakery in 2006 to help them recalibrate and established it as their headquarters. The building was located at 4A Fleet Road, Hampstead, London, with the entrance intercalated between an estate agent and a restaurant. Will Champion described it as a bigger version of Jonny Buckland's bedroom, from the time the group studied at University College London. Producers Dan Green and Rik Simpson converted the ground floor into a studio, which was good for overdubs, but difficult for full band recordings. Management offices were placed right above.

== Recording ==
The first Coldplay album to be recorded at the Bakery was Viva la Vida or Death and All His Friends, starting from November 2006 until April 2008. Champion stated the group would visit the building every day with no pressure and simply work on their music, marking a significant contrast with the experiences they previously had on a studio, when most recordings ended up getting scrapped or had to be redone because more rehearsal and writing sessions were needed. Meetings coincided with Phil Harvey's return to the lineup. The creative process was supported by producer Brian Eno and violinist Davide Rossi. Coldplay learned brand-new songwriting, recording and experimentation techniques under the former. After Viva la Vida or Death and All His Friends was released, the Bakery remained fully functional, particularly for programming and editing. It only closed in 2024 due to reduced usage.

== The Beehive ==
Opened in January 2010, the Beehive is a former church hall at 17 Fleet Road which got converted into the Bakery's sister building. Simpson claimed that it has a large space where he can record the entire band properly and, since they are all in the same room, it is better for communication. The studio was originally designed to be a more contemporary facility, since its equipment include a Pro Tools HD system, a Slate Raven MTi touchscreen controller, racks full of outboard gear and an SSL Matrix console. Moreover, Coldplay's best gear was said to be kept at the Beehive. NME mentioned that the group rehearse every Thursday there. Other musicians have used the building for recording as well, these include Ash, Eno, the High Wire, and Peter Gabriel. Between 2021 and 2023, the Beehive underwent a number of technical and structural renovations commissioned by Coldplay and handled by Green, who partnered with a specialized team from Miloco Builds, a subsidiary of Miloco Studios.

== Gallery ==
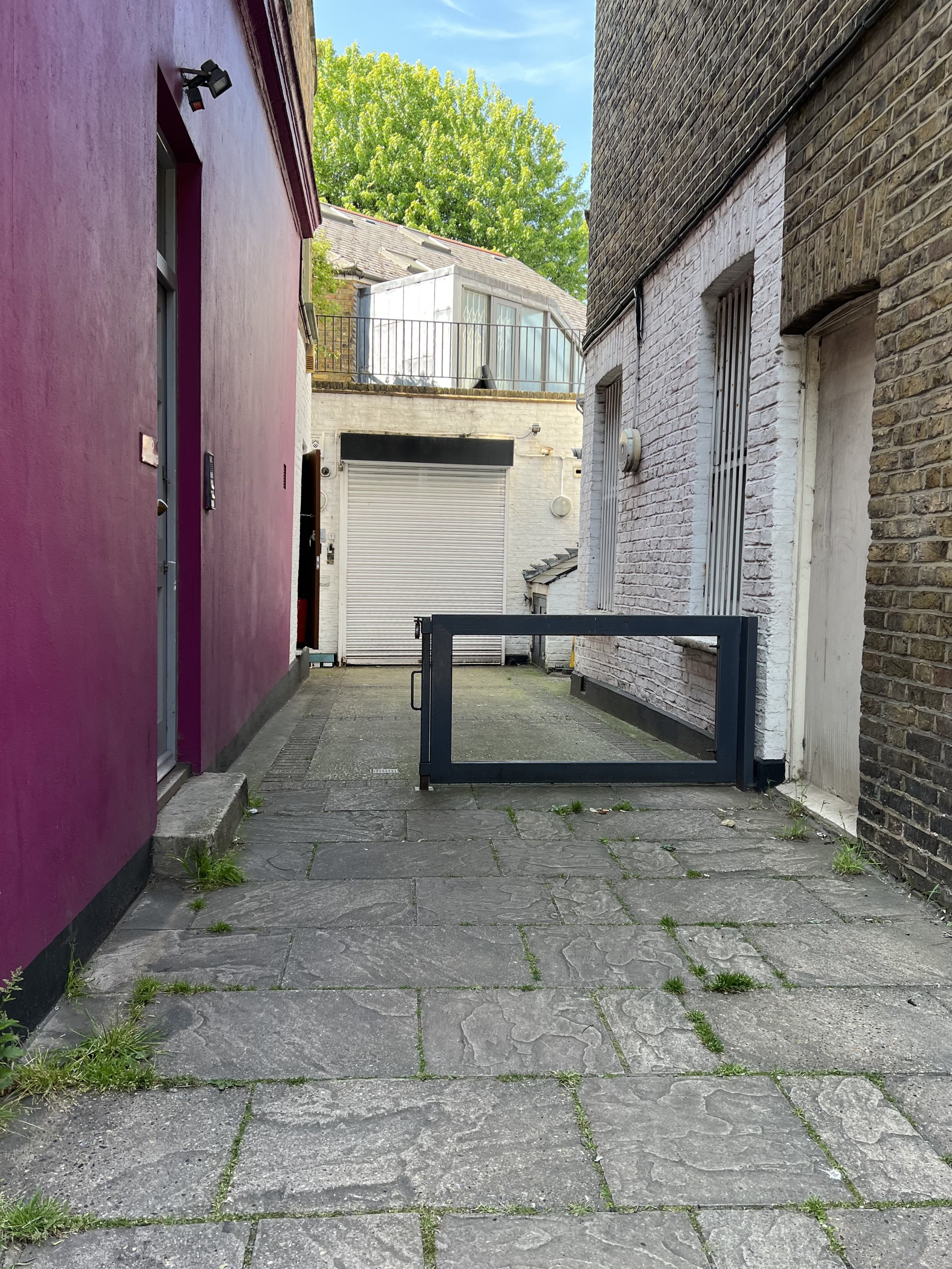
The Bakery's entrance up-close

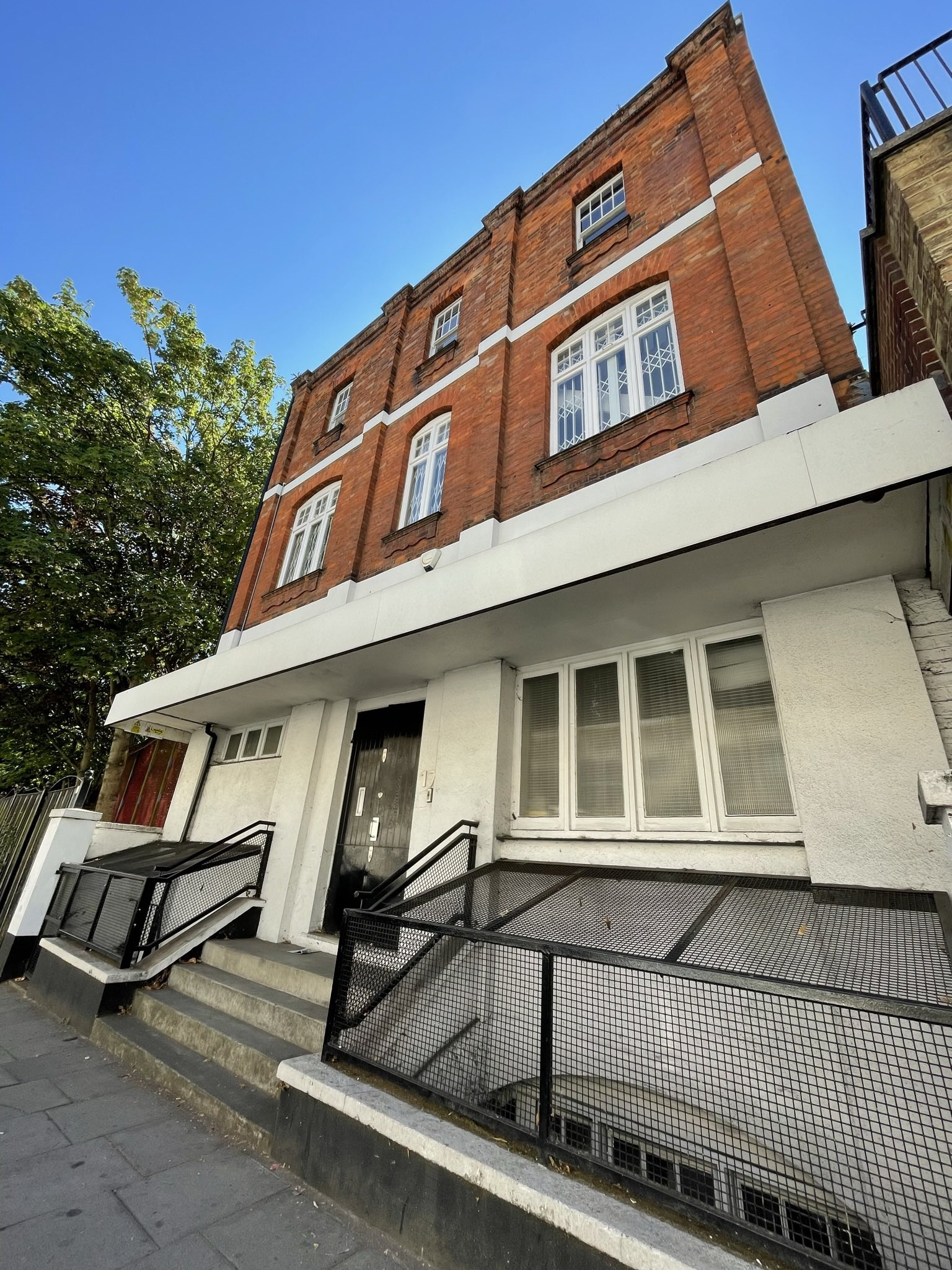
The Beehive's old entrance

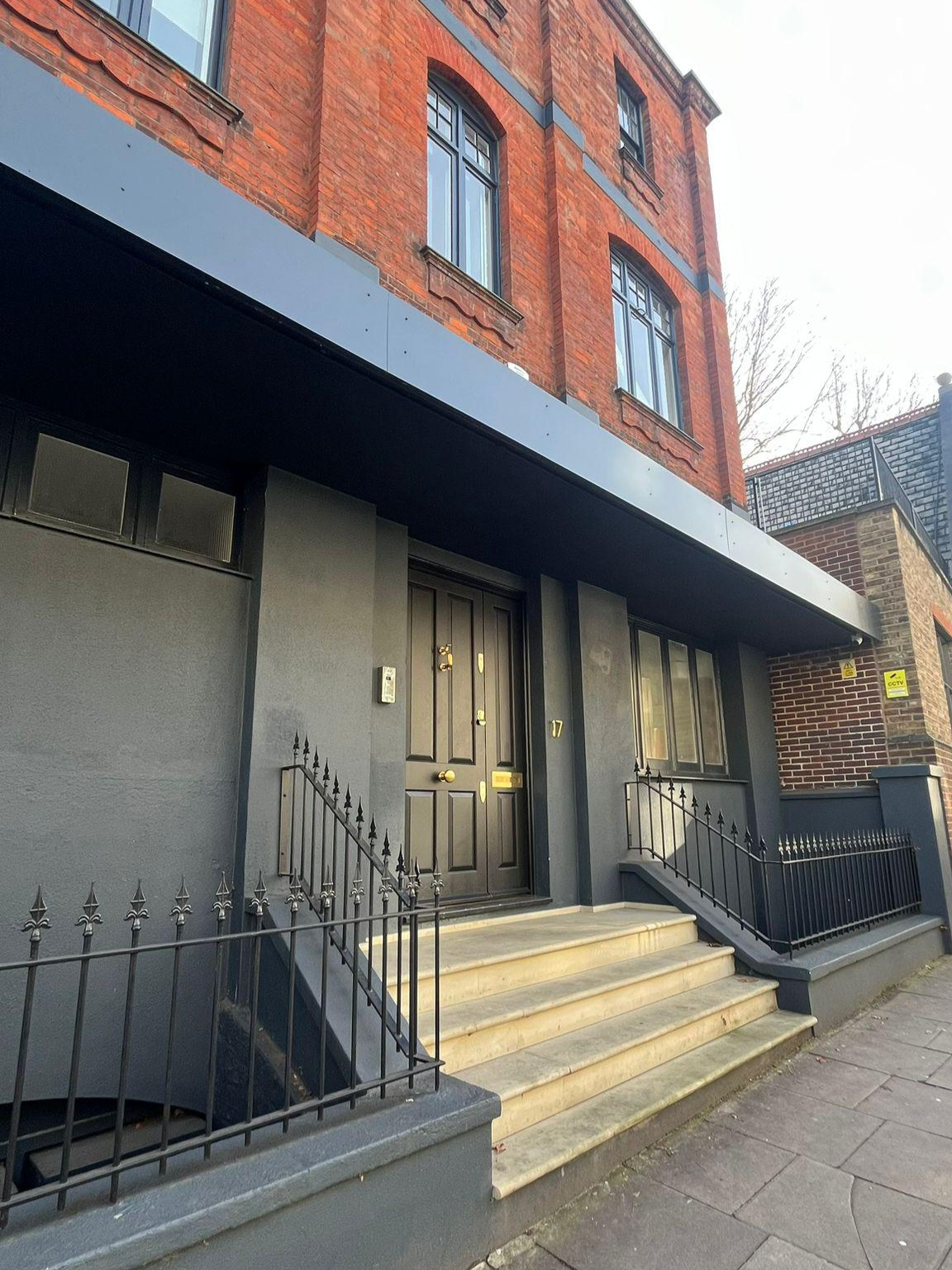
The Beehive's new entrance

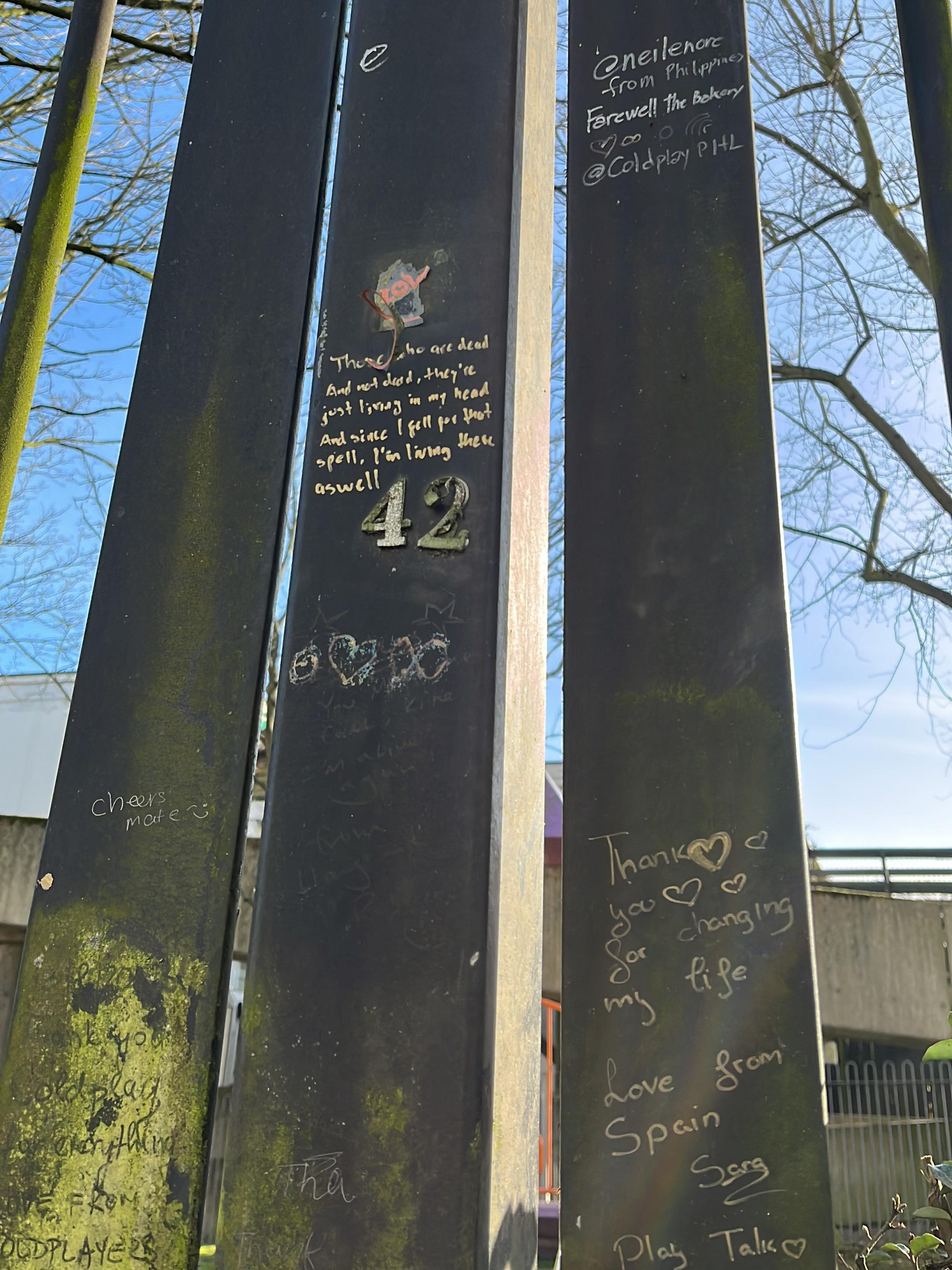
Messages in Hampstead

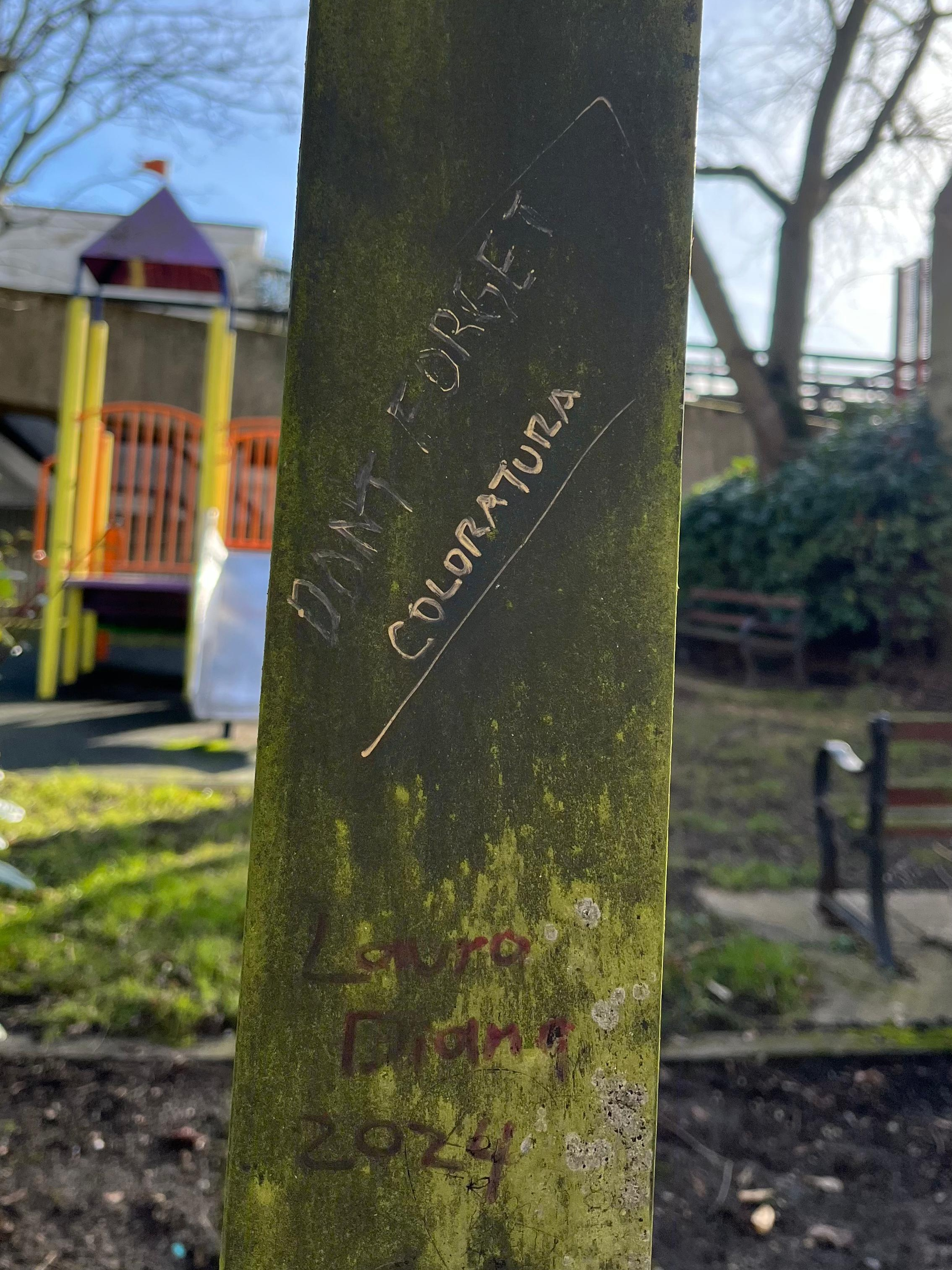
Don't forget "Coloratura"

== See also ==
- List of British recording studios
- Recording studio as an instrument
