= Real World Studios =

Recording studio, founded in 1989 by Peter Gabriel

Coordinates: 51.4189°N 2.2525°W

- Type: Recording studio
- Industry: Music
- Founded: 1989; 37 years ago in Box, Wiltshire, England
- Founder: Peter Gabriel
- Headquarters: Box Mill, Mill Lane, Box, Wiltshire SN13 8PL, Box, England
- Website: realworldstudios.com

Real World Studios is a residential recording studio complex founded by Peter Gabriel and situated in the old Box Mill building in the village of Box, Wiltshire, England, near to the city of Bath. It is closely associated with the Real World Records record label, Real World Publishing, and the WOMAD Festival, whose offices are also based at the complex.

== History ==
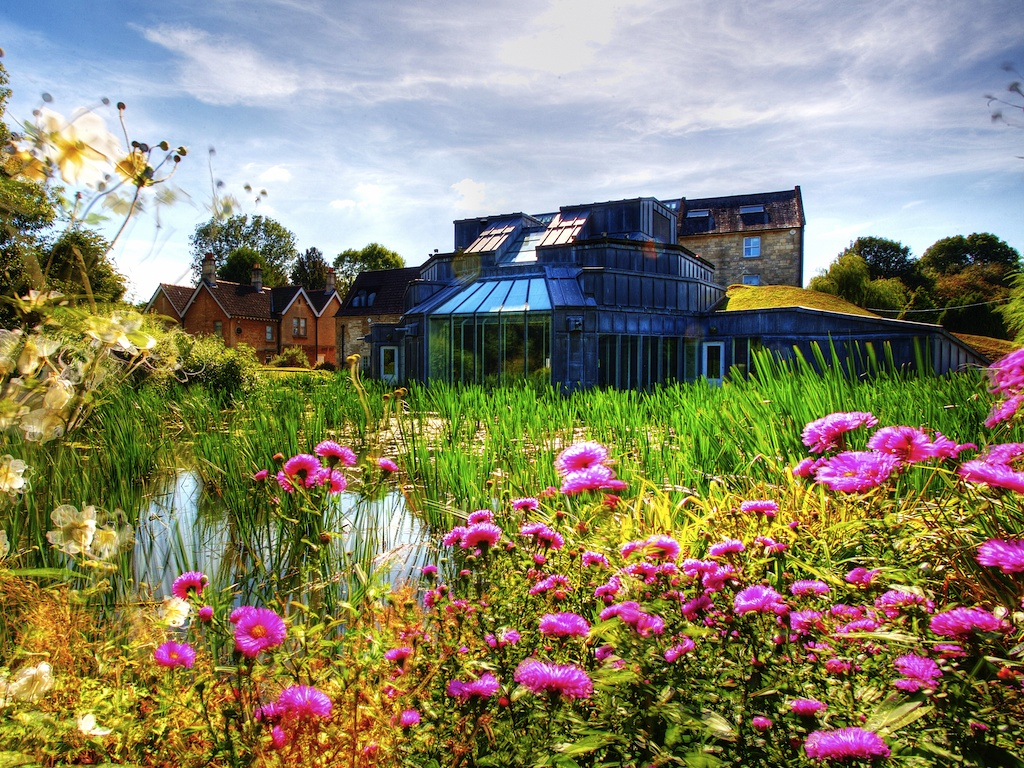
Real World Studios

In 1986, following the success of his album So, Peter Gabriel decided to pursue a permanent recording facility. Knowing that he wanted to remain in the same area as the Ashcombe House that he had been renting, and that he wanted the new location to be close to running water, Gabriel looked at several sites, mostly old mills, near Bath. A 13-acre site in the village of Box featured the By Brook and several existing buildings, including Box Mill, a 200-year-old water mill that had been converted to offices in the 1950s. Gabriel purchased the site and its buildings from Spafax in 1987.

Gabriel's vision for the new studio was a unified space where everyone could work together, where musicians aren't separated from the engineer or producer. Additionally, he wanted these creative spaces to have elements of light, air, and water. Working with architectural design firm FCBStudios, the existing buildings were converted and a new building ('The Big Room') was added. The new complex provided both recording studio facilities and residential accommodations.

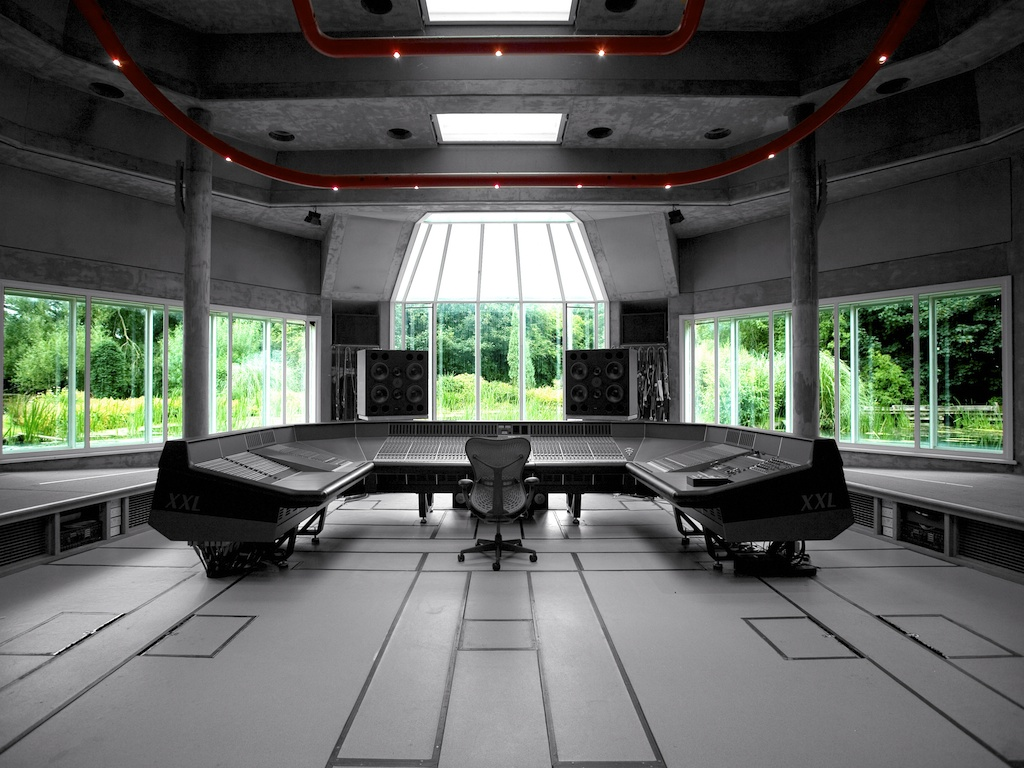
"The Big Room" in the Real World Studios

== Facility ==
The largest recording space, appropriately referred to as the Big Room, is a 2,000 square foot combination live room and control room with a custom wraparound 72-channel SSL 9000 XL K Series mixing console at its centre, with large windows offering expansive views of the adjacent millpond and gardens. Although the Big Room has a separate machine room and two isolation booths, it is designed as one large collaborative recording space with no dividing walls. Alternately, the Big Room also functions as a Dolby Surround 7.1-certified film mixing room.

Adjoining the Big Room and within the former mill building is the Wood Room. This room utilizes a 24-channel SSL AWS 924 console, and features a more lively acoustic character, mezzanine floor and movable acoustic screens, as well as its own isolation booth. The Big Room and The Wood Room can be booked together for a larger recording space, or individually for smaller or lower-budget projects. Also available is the Rehearsal Room—a 49 foot by 16 foot space for rehearsals or pre-production.

The Red Room is a dedicated mixing and production room well-suited for post-production, ADR recording, and mixing for television and film. A Foley stage is also present in the room.

The studio also has the Writing Room and the Workroom, which are Gabriel's own private workspaces. The Workroom, which is equipped with a talkback system, multitrack recording capabilities, and MIDI/video connection to other rooms in the facility, has also been made available for other clients to rent in the past; one of Gabriel's managers said in a 1992 interview with EQ magazine that "when we get a booking we just kick him out".

== Clients ==
Notable clients of Real World Studios include A-ha, Alicia Keys, Amy Winehouse, Beyoncé, Björk, Black Grape, Blue October, Bonnie Raitt, Chris de Burgh, Coldplay, Daniel Lanois, Deep Purple, Foals, Goldfrapp, Harry Styles, Idles, Indigo Girls, James, James Morrison, Jay-Z, Joseph Arthur, Kanye West, Kasabian, Katie Melua, King Crimson, Kylie Minogue, Laura Marling, Lola Young, Loreena McKennitt, Maggie Rogers, Marillion, Melanie C, Mumford & Sons, Natalie Duncan, New Order, Paloma Faith, Paolo Nutini, Papa Wemba, Paul Simon, Periphery, Pixies, Placebo, The Pretenders, Rag'n'Bone Man, Reef, Robert Plant, Roger Waters, Sade, Seal, Sia, Squid, Stereophonics, Suzi Quatro, Take That, Therapy?, Tom Jones, Toto, Ultravox, Van Morrison, The Vamps, Wet Wet Wet, and The 1975.

Real World Studios has been host to film and TV projects including Quantum of Solace, The Golden Compass, Green Zone, The No. 1 Ladies' Detective Agency and The Odyssey
